= Intermediate scrutiny =

2nd level of judicial review in U.S. constitutional law

Intermediate scrutiny, in U.S. constitutional law, is the second level of deciding issues using judicial review. The other levels are typically referred to as rational basis review (least rigorous) and strict scrutiny (most rigorous).

In order to overcome the intermediate scrutiny test, it must be shown that the law or policy being challenged furthers an important government interest by means that are substantially related to that interest.

Intermediate scrutiny may be contrasted with "strict scrutiny", the higher standard of review that requires narrowly tailored and least restrictive means to further a compelling governmental interest, and "rational basis review", a lower standard of review that requires the law or policy be rationally related to a legitimate government interest.

This approach is most often employed in reviewing limits on commercial speech, content-neutral regulations of speech, and state actions discriminating on the basis of sex.

== Laws subject to Equal Protection scrutiny ==
Constitutional Equal Protection analysis applies not only to challenges against the federal government, but also to state and local governments. Although the Fourteenth Amendment's Equal Protection Clause applies only to state and local governments, the United States Supreme Court has implied an Equal Protection limitation on the federal government through a process known as "reverse incorporation". As the Fourteenth Amendment applies directly to the states, the incorporation process was unnecessary to hold this restriction against state and local governments. Equal Protection analysis also applies to both legislative and executive action regardless if the action is of a substantive or procedural nature. Judicially crafted (common law) rules are also valid only if they conform to the requirements of Equal Protection. See, e.g., Reed v. Campbell, 476 U.S. 852 (1986).

=== Sex-based classifications ===
In the context of sex-based classifications, intermediate scrutiny applies to constitutional challenges of equal protection and discrimination.

A notable example of a court using intermediate scrutiny came in the 1976 case Craig v. Boren, which was the first case in the Supreme Court of the United States that determined that statutory or administrative sex-based classifications were subject to an intermediate standard of judicial review.

In the 1982 case Mississippi University for Women v. Hogan, the Supreme Court ruled that the burden is on the proponent of the discrimination to establish an "exceedingly persuasive justification" for sex-based classification to be valid. The court thereby applied intermediate scrutiny in a manner closer to strict scrutiny, and in recent decisions the court has instead preferred the term "exacting scrutiny" when referring to the intermediate level of Equal Protection analysis. For example, the court applied similar exacting intermediate scrutiny when ruling on sex-based classifications in both the 1984 case J.E.B. v. Alabama ex rel. T.B. (concerning strikes against specifically male jurors during jury composition) and the 1996 case United States v. Virginia (concerning the Virginia Military Institute's policy of conducting male-only admission).

In the 2011 case Glenn v. Brumby, the United States Court of Appeals for the Eleventh Circuit held that firing an employee based on transgender status was a form of sex discrimination and therefore subject to intermediate scrutiny. In the landmark 2020 case Bostock v. Clayton County, the Supreme Court agreed in holding that discrimination on the basis of sexual orientation or gender identity is necessarily also discrimination "because of sex", with Justice Neil Gorsuch's six-justice majority opinion arguing that this was because employers discriminating against gay or transgender employees accept a certain conduct (e.g., attraction to women or dressing femininely) in employees of one sex but not in employees of the other sex.

In the 1974 case Kahn v. Shevin, the Supreme Court held that a Florida property tax exemption for widows did not violate the Equal Protection Clause by not providing a similar benefit for widowers. The court decided that the state tax law was "reasonably designed" to soften the financial impact of a husband's death which "imposes a disproportionately heavy burden".

=== Illegitimacy ===
Restrictions based on illegitimacy are also subjected to intermediate scrutiny in the Equal Protection context.

The courts have found such scrutiny necessary for a number of reasons. Rationally, imposing legal burdens on an illegitimate person in order to express disapproval of the conduct of her parents is illogical, unjust, and contrary to the fundamental principle that legal burdens should have some relationship to individual wrongdoing. Like race or gender, the court has stressed that an illegitimate person's status of birth is a condition over which she has no control, and it has no bearing on her ability or willingness to contribute to society. In applying increasingly exacting intermediate scrutiny, the courts have noted that illegitimate persons are a stigmatized minority, are vastly outnumbered politically, and are the target of long-standing and continuing invidious legal discrimination. For all these reasons, exacting constitutional scrutiny is mandated under the Equal Protection clause of the Fourteenth Amendment.

An additional ground for heightening scrutiny of illegitimacy-based discriminatory statutes occurs whenever such statutes involve sex discrimination (as they commonly do). Following a sweep of legislative changes in almost every state in the early nineteenth century, all non-marital children were legitimated as to their mothers. Each such child remained illegitimate as to her male parent, only. This gender-based classification disadvantaged male parents and privileged female parents in their fundamental familial relationship to their child. Such gender discrimination was held an additional grounds for intermediate scrutiny of statutory denial of the father-child relationship in cases such as Caban v. Mohammed, 441 U.S. 380 (1979).

=== Sexual orientation ===
Courts have been reluctant to apply intermediate scrutiny to cases centered around sexual orientation. For instance, in Romer v. Evans 517 US 620 (1996), which struck down an amendment to the Colorado Constitution that invalidated legal protections based on sexual orientation, the United States Supreme Court held that the amendment violated the Equal Protection Clause because the amendment was motivated by a bare desire to harm a politically unpopular group, which is never a legitimate governmental interest.

In Lawrence v. Texas, 539 U.S. 558 (2003), the U.S. Supreme Court struck down anti-sodomy laws as unconstitutional, explicitly overturning its earlier Bowers v. Hardwick, 478 U.S. 186 (1986) decision, but did not specify the level of scrutiny it applied. In Lofton v. Secretary of the Department of Children & Family Services, 358 F.3d 804 (11th Cir. 2004), the United States Court of Appeals for the Eleventh Circuit explicitly held that Lawrence did not apply strict scrutiny. However, in 2008, the California Supreme Court adopted the strict scrutiny standard for state laws that discriminate on the basis of sexual orientation in the case In re Marriage Cases.

On October 18, 2012, the Second Circuit Court of Appeals became the first federal appeals court, in Windsor v. United States, to hold that laws that classify people based on sexual orientation should be subject to intermediate scrutiny. The decision of the Second Circuit was later affirmed by the Supreme Court on June 26, 2013, but the United States Supreme Court did not specifically state the level of scrutiny it applied. On January 21, 2014, the Ninth Circuit Court of Appeals ruled in SmithKline Beecham Corp. v. Abbott Laboratories that "classifications based on sexual orientation are subject to heightened scrutiny", making it the second appellate court to do so.

== Free speech ==
There are two types of laws affecting "free speech" among United States citizens: content-based and content-neutral. In the free speech context, intermediate scrutiny is the test or standard of review that courts apply when analyzing content-neutral speech versus content-based speech. Content-based speech is reviewed under strict scrutiny in which courts evaluate the value of the subject matter or the content of the communication. Content-neutral laws are evaluated by the nature and scope of the speech regarding the time, place and manner of communication. Content-neutral speech is reviewed under intermediate scrutiny versus strict scrutiny because this speech is only restricted by the way in which the information is communicated; not the information itself. In 1968, United States v. O'Brien established a four-factor test to determine whether restricting content-neutral speech is constitutional: (1) Is restriction within the constitutional power of government? (2) Does restriction further important or substantial governmental interest? (3) Is the governmental interest unrelated to the suppression of free expression? (4) Is the restriction narrowly tailored – no greater than necessary? Later, a fifth factor was added in Ladue v. Gilleo, 512 U.S. 43 (1994): (5) whether the restriction leaves open ample opportunities of communication.

When deciding if a restriction is narrowly tailored, courts consider the setting of the communication. Setting has two divisions: public forum and non- public forum. In a public forum people have a right to express themselves however, not in a non-public forum. Adderley v. Florida, 385 U.S. 39 (1966) held that freedom of speech may be limited in a jailhouse because a jailhouse is not a public forum therefore speech is subject to restriction. The court in Adderley v. Florida used the rational basis test standard of review even though the law was content neutral because a jailhouse is a non-public forum.

Ward v. Rock Against Racism, 491 U.S. 781 (1989) held that a city's restriction on loud music volume controlled by equipment and technicians is constitutional because it is narrowly tailored. Madsen v. Women's Health Center, 512 U.S. 753 (1994) upheld part of an injunction restricting abortion protesters from entering the "buffer zone" around the abortion clinic because this was the least restrictive means and still gave protestors ample opportunity to communicate outside the buffer zone on the sidewalk, which was a public forum. The court used the strict scrutiny standard of review in Madsen.

Intermediate scrutiny applies to regulation that does not directly target speech but has a substantial impact on a particular message. It applies to time, place, and manner restrictions on speech, for example, with the additional requirement of "adequate alternative channels of communication." In other words, if restricting the time, place, or manner of speech means that speech cannot take place at all, the regulation fails intermediate scrutiny. It has been used in "erogenous zoning" cases such as Renton v. Playtime Theatres, Inc., 475 U.S. 41 (1986), that limit the concentration or require concentration of certain types of establishments. It has also been used for other types of content-neutral regulation, as well as for content-neutral speech compulsion. Intermediate scrutiny also applies to regulation of commercial speech, as long as the state interests in regulating relate to fair bargaining. Regulations for other reasons, such as protection of children, are subject to strict scrutiny.

== Gun control ==
Prior to New York State Rifle & Pistol Association, Inc. v. Bruen (2022), which rejected application of intermediate scrutiny to the right to keep and bear arms under the Second Amendment to the United States Constitution, various federal and state laws restricting access to guns by certain people, laws that restrict or ban the acquisition or ownership of certain types of firearms by the general population, and laws that restrict the carrying of firearms by private citizens in public places had been largely upheld by the lower courts on the basis of intermediate scrutiny. In many of these cases, such laws survived intermediate scrutiny on the basis that the government was furthering an "important interest in public safety" in enacting laws that constrain the individual right to keep and bear arms under the Second Amendment. New York State Rifle & Pistol Association, Inc. v. Bruen made clear that the Second Amendment is not subject to means testing, whether intermediate or strict, but rather the historical tradition test.

== "Intermediate" versus "heightened" ==
The phrase "heightened scrutiny" has been used interchangeably with "intermediate scrutiny", but it is unclear whether the two are actually legally interchangeable. In the 2008 case Witt v. Department of the Air Force, the United States Court of Appeals for the Ninth Circuit ruled that the military policy known as "don't ask, don't tell" (DADT) was subject to heightened scrutiny based on its analysis of Lawrence. The court articulated a three-pronged test for heightened scrutiny. To pass the test, a law "must advance an important governmental interest, the intrusion must significantly further that interest, and the intrusion must be necessary to further that interest". This differs from the typical "substantially related to important governmental interests" two-prong test for intermediate scrutiny. As the Obama administration chose not to appeal Witt to the Supreme Court, it is binding precedent on the Ninth Circuit and has been cited as such in the 2011 case Log Cabin Republicans v. United States, another case challenging the constitutionality of DADT. The district court in Log Cabin Republicans applied the three-pronged test in ruling DADT to be unconstitutional. The administration appealed this decision to the Ninth Circuit. In December 2010, DADT was legislatively repealed. On September 29, 2011, the Ninth Circuit vacated the district court's decision, ruling that the legislative repeal of "don't ask, don't tell" rendered the case moot.

The Obama administration, in its refusal to defend several lawsuits challenging Section 3 of the Defense of Marriage Act, argued that heightened scrutiny is the appropriate level of scrutiny to apply to statutes that discriminate on the basis of sexual orientation.

== See also ==
- Craig v. Boren
- Renton v. Playtime Theatres, Inc.
- Mississippi University for Women v. Hogan
- District of Columbia v. Heller
