= Log Cabin Republicans v. United States =

Federal lawsuit

- Court: United States Court of Appeals for the Ninth Circuit
- Full case name: Log Cabin Republicans, a non-profit corporation v. United States of America and Robert M. Gates, Secretary of Defense, in his official capacity,
- Decided: September 29 2011
- Citation: 658 F.3d 1162 (9th Cir. 2011)

Case history
- Prior history: 716 F. Supp. 2d 884 (C.D. Cal. 2010)
- Subsequent history: Rehearing en banc denied (Nov. 2011)

Holding
- The legislative repeal of Don't Ask, Don't Tell rendered the case moot, and the decision of the lower court finding DADT unconstitutional is vacated.

Court membership
- Judges sitting: Arthur Alarcón, Diarmuid O'Scannlain, Barry G. Silverman

Case opinions
- Per curiam
- Concurrence: Diarmuid O'Scannlain

Log Cabin Republicans v. United States, 658 F.3d 1162 (9th Cir. 2011) was a federal lawsuit challenging the constitutionality of 10 U.S.C. § 654, commonly known as don't ask, don't tell (DADT), which, prior to its repeal, excluded homosexuals from openly serving in the United States military. The Log Cabin Republicans (LCR), an organization composed of lesbian, gay, bisexual, and transgender (LGBT) Republicans, brought the suit on behalf of LCR members who serve or served in the military and were subject to DADT.

LCR initially filed the suit, a facial challenge to the statute, in 2004. A bench trial began on July 13, 2010, before Judge Virginia A. Phillips of the United States District Court for the Central District of California. The Justice Department had unsuccessfully sought to have the suit dismissed, arguing that as long as Congress had a rational basis for passing DADT in 1993, then it is constitutional. The Justice Department also asserted at trial that LCR did not have standing to challenge the law. LCR argued that DADT violates constitutional guarantees of due process and free speech.

Phillips advised the parties pre-trial that she would not apply rational basis review, the lowest level of constitutional scrutiny, to the case. Instead, in accordance with the ruling by the United States Court of Appeals for the Ninth Circuit in Witt v. Department of the Air Force, she would apply intermediate scrutiny, meaning to be constitutional, DADT must significantly further an important governmental interest that can be advanced in no other way.

On September 9, 2010, Phillips ruled that the ban is unconstitutional. On October 12, Phillips issued an injunction banning the military from enforcing the policy. She subsequently denied the government's request for a stay of the injunction, and the government then took their request to the Ninth Circuit, which granted a stay. On November 12, the United States Supreme Court denied an application by the Log Cabin Republicans to vacate the stay. The Ninth Circuit vacated the stay on July 6, 2011, and ordered an end to enforcement of DADT. On September 29, 2011, the Ninth Circuit issued a per curiam opinion that the legislative repeal of "don't ask, don't tell" had rendered the case moot.

== Attorneys ==
Daniel Woods of the law firm of White & Case was the lead attorney for the plaintiffs. Assistant United States Attorney Paul Freeborne defended DADT on behalf of the United States.

== Proceedings ==
Oral arguments before the Ninth Circuit; Arthur Alarcón, Diarmuid O'Scannlain, and Barry G. Silverman presiding

Witnesses for the plaintiffs included:

- Nathaniel Frank, author of Unfriendly Fire: How the Gay Ban Undermines the Military and Weakens America. Frank testified about his research into the successful integration of openly gay personnel into the militaries of other countries;
- Former petty officer 3rd class Joseph Christopher Rocha, a gay former sailor who was subjected to hazing during his tenure with a Military Working Dog unit at Naval Support Activity Bahrain and was discharged under DADT;
- Aaron Belkin, director of the Palm Center, a think tank studying sexual orientation and gender issues in the military;
- Mike Almy, a former United States Air Force officer discharged after another service member searched his private emails without permission;
- Former United States Army interrogator and founder of Servicemembers United Alexander Nicholson;
- Professor Máel Embser-Herbert, professor of sociology at Hamline University in Saint Paul, Minnesota, who testified about the impact of the policy on women in the military.
- Professor Alan Okros of the Canadian Forces College in Toronto, who testified about the Canadian experience with ending its gay-exclusionary military policy;
- Former Staff Sergeant Anthony Loverde, a seven-year United States Air Force veteran who testified that unit cohesion and morale improved with his unit's knowledge that he was "a little different".
- Professor Robert MacCoun of the University of California at Berkeley, who coauthored the 1993 RAND Report (and the subsequent 2010 update report) on Sexual Orientation and US Military Personnel Policy.

The government presented no witnesses.

Closing arguments were made on July 23, 2010, with LCR attorney Woods asking for a national injunction against enforcement of DADT.

== Rulings ==
On September 9, 2010, Judge Phillips ruled in favor of plaintiffs, finding that DADT violates the First and Fifth Amendments to the United States Constitution. Noting the deference that courts are required to show the military in reviewing First Amendment claims, Phillips found that the "sweeping reach" of the restrictions placed on the speech of LGBT military personnel by DADT is "far broader than is reasonably necessary to protect the substantial government interest at stake". Phillips also found that DADT violates LGBT personnel's right of association, as it prohibits them from openly joining organizations like LCR for fear of reprisal, thereby depriving them of their ability to petition the government for redress of grievances. Phillips further ruled that DADT violates LGBT personnel's substantive due process rights, as articulated in Lawrence v. Texas, associated with the "'autonomy of self that includes freedom of thought, belief, expression, and certain intimate conduct.'"

On October 12, 2010, Phillips issued a permanent worldwide injunction ordering the military to immediately "suspend and discontinue any investigation, or discharge, separation, or other proceeding, that may have been commenced" under "don't ask, don't tell". Plaintiffs' attorney Woods said "the order represents a complete and total victory for the Log Cabin Republicans and reaffirms the constitutional rights of gays and lesbians in the military who are fighting and dying for our country."

One of the nation's largest organizations for gay and lesbian military personnel, the Servicemembers Legal Defense Network, advised gay service members not to come out because of uncertainty about the government's response to the ruling. A Pentagon spokesman said the department would abide by the ruling, and senior military officials told military lawyers to stop enforcing DADT.

On October 14, 2010, the Department of Justice appealed from the judgment to the Ninth Circuit. At the same time, the government asked for an emergency stay of the injunction pending the outcome of the appellate process. On October 19, Phillips denied the government's request for a stay. On October 20, the government asked the Ninth Circuit for a stay, which the Ninth circuit granted. On November 5, the plaintiffs asked the Supreme Court to vacate the 2-1 decision to keep the stay in place. Justice Kennedy, who handles emergency motions from the Ninth Circuit, asked the government to respond by November 10. On November 12, the Supreme Court denied the application to vacate the stay.

With the injunction stayed, enforcement of DADT resumed, but under stricter guidelines.

On December 22, 2010, President Barack Obama signed the Don't Ask, Don't Tell Repeal Act of 2010. His signature began the repeal process but repeal was not immediate and DADT remained in effect. The Justice Department asked the Ninth Circuit to suspend LCR's suit in light of the legislative repeal. LCR opposed the request, noting that gay personnel were still subject to discharge. On January 28, 2011, the court denied the Justice Department's request. On February 25, the Department of Justice filed its response, in which it no longer defended the constitutionality of DADT but asked the court to consider how the repeal of DADT has placed the case "in a different posture" from when the judge granted an injunction on October 12, 2010.

On July 6, 2011, a three-judge panel of the U.S. Ninth Circuit Court of Appeals lifted the stay of Judge Phillips' ruling and ordered the military to cease enforcement of DADT. The Court cited the military's progress in implementing the repeal of DADT and the brief filed on July 1 by the Department of Justice in Golinski v. Office of Personnel Management arguing that classifications based on sexual orientation, as found in DADT, should be subjected to heightened scrutiny. Pentagon officials said that they are "taking immediate steps" to comply.

On September 29, 2011, the Ninth Circuit vacated the district court's decision, ruling that the legislative repeal of "don't ask, don't tell" rendered the case moot. The dismissal left the lower court ruling without value as precedent. On November 9, 2011, the Court denied LCR's motion to hear the case en banc, stating that none of the judges voted to rehear it. LCR announced that it would not appeal to the United States Supreme Court.
