= Williams v. Pryor =

American federal lawsuit

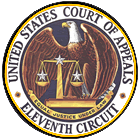
- Court: United States Court of Appeals for the Eleventh Circuit
- Full case name: Sherri Williams, B.J. Bailey, et al. v. Bill Pryor
- Decided: October 12, 2000
- Citation: 229 F.3d 1331

Case history
- Prior history: 41 F. Supp. 2d 1257 (N.D. Ala. 1999)
- Subsequent history: Rehearing denied, 240 F.3d 944 (January 31, 2001)

Court membership
- Judges sitting: R. Lanier Anderson III, Susan Harrell Black, Cynthia Holcomb Hall (9th Cir.)

Case opinions
- Majority: Black, joined by a unanimous court

Laws applied
- U.S. Const. amend. XIV

Williams v. Pryor, 229 F.3d 1331 (11th Cir. 2000), rehearing denied, 240 F.3d 944 (11th Cir. 2001) was a federal lawsuit that unsuccessfully challenged an Alabama law criminalizing the sale of sex toys in the state. In 1998, a statute enacted by the legislature of the State of Alabama amended the obscenity provisions of the Alabama Code to make the distribution of certain defined sexual devices a criminal offense. Vendors and users of such devices filed a constitutional challenge to the statute in the United States District Court for the Northern District of Alabama against William H. Pryor, Jr., in his official capacity as the Attorney General of the State of Alabama. The district court declined to hold the statute violated any constitutional right but determined the statute was unconstitutional because it lacked a rational basis. The State appealed to the Eleventh Circuit Court of Appeals, which reversed the lower court ruling on October 12, 2000.

== Background ==
After the 1998 amendment, the Alabama Code obscenity provisions provide the following:

It shall be unlawful for any person to knowingly distribute, possess with intent to distribute, or offer or agree to distribute any obscene material or any device designed or marketed as useful primarily for the stimulation of human genital organs for any thing of pecuniary value.

A first violation is a misdemeanor punishable by a maximum fine of $10,000 and up to one year of jail or hard labor; a subsequent violation is a class C felony. The State conceded the statute's proscription of the distribution of sexual devices in Alabama does not apply to devices acquired as gifts or by purchases in another state. The statute also does not restrict possession or use of a sexual device by an individual, but only the commercial distribution of the devices.

After considering Supreme Court precedent, the District Court determined the statute does not implicate previously recognized fundamental constitutional rights. The court also declined to extend those rights to provide a fundamental right to the use of sexual devices. The district court next reviewed the statute under rational basis scrutiny and concluded the statute lacked a rational basis. The court accordingly held the statute unconstitutional and issued a permanent injunction against its enforcement.

== Eleventh Circuit ruling ==
The Circuit Court explained that whether a statute is constitutional is determined in large part by the level of scrutiny applied by the courts. Statutes that infringe fundamental rights, or that make distinctions based upon suspect classifications such as race or national origin, are subject to strict scrutiny, which requires that the statute be narrowly tailored to achieve a compelling government interest. Most statutes reviewed under the very stringent strict scrutiny standard are found to be unconstitutional. Quoting Romer v. Evans, the Circuit Court stated that "if a law neither burdens a fundamental right nor targets a suspect class, we will uphold the [law] so long as it bears a rational relation to some legitimate end." According to the Court, almost every statute subject to the very deferential rational basis scrutiny standard is found to be constitutional.

The Circuit Court concluded that the district court erred in determining the Alabama statute lacks a rational basis. It found that the State's interest in public morality is a legitimate interest rationally served by the statute, and that the crafting and safeguarding of public morality has long been an established part of the States' plenary police power to legislate and indisputably is a legitimate government interest under rational basis scrutiny.

The Court rejected plaintiffs argument that the statute is constitutionally irrational because it is contrary to a wide spectrum of public and professional opinions which recognize numerous legitimate and beneficial uses of sexual devices, especially the necessity of sexual devices for some persons to achieve medical or emotional health. The Court said that however misguided the legislature of Alabama may have been in enacting the statute challenged in this case, the statute is not constitutionally irrational under rational basis scrutiny because it is rationally related to the State's legitimate power to protect its view of public morality. "The Constitution presumes that ... improvident decisions will eventually be rectified by the democratic process and that judicial intervention is generally unwarranted no matter how unwisely we may think a political branch has acted."

The Court remanded the as-applied challenges for consideration by the district court because the record and stipulations were too narrow to permit the Court to decide whether or to what extent the Alabama statute infringes a fundamental right to sexual privacy of the specific plaintiffs in this case.

== Subsequent challenges ==
In December 2003 the Supreme court ruled in Lawrence v. Texas which overturned the previous decision of Bowers v. Hardwick. In light of this the ACLU again challenged the decision before the 11th Circuit in February 2007. The 11th circuit ruled that even though Bowers v. Hardwick had been overruled that in doing so the Supreme Court had

"declined the invitation" to recognize a fundamental right to sexual privacy, which would have compelled us to employ strict scrutiny in assessing the constitutionality of the challenged statute ... Thus, because there is no fundamental right at issue, we apply rational basis scrutiny to the challenged statute.

... Accordingly, we find that public morality survives as a rational basis for legislation even after Lawrence, and we find that in this case the State's interest in the preservation of public morality remains a rational basis for the challenged statute. By upholding the statute, we do not endorse the judgment of the Alabama legislature.

In Reliable Consultants Inc. v. Earle, on February 12, 2008, the 5th Circuit overturned the Texas ban on the sale of sex toys using the similar facts that failed in the above appeal. It held:

Just as in Lawrence, the State here wants to use its laws to enforce a public moral code by restricting private intimate conduct. The case is not about public sex. It is not about controlling commerce in sex. It is about controlling what people do in the privacy of their own homes because the State is morally opposed to a certain type of consensual private intimate conduct. This is an insufficient justification for the statute after Lawrence.

In This That and the Other Gift & Tobacco, Inc. v. Cobb County, Ga., the 11th Circuit struck down on First Amendment grounds a Georgia law that banned advertising obscene material, including sex toys.

== Full rulings ==
- October 12, 2000
- January 31st 2001
- July 28th 2004
- February 14th 2007
