= 1996 in LGBTQ rights =

This is a list of notable events in the history of LGBT rights that took place in the year 1996.

== Events ==
- Homosexuality is decriminalised in Bosnia and Herzegovina, although Republika Srpska did not remove homosexuality from its criminal code until 1998.

=== May ===
- 8 – South Africa becomes the first nation in the world to explicitly prohibit discrimination based on sexual orientation in its constitution.
- 20 – In Romer v. Evans, the Supreme Court of the United States rules 6–3 that Colorado's Amendment 2, which would have voided existing gay rights laws in Colorado and prevented any new gay rights laws from taking effect, is unconstitutional.
- 21 – Hungary legalizes same-sex unions, first among the ex-communist countries, and fifth country worldwide. The Parliament voted 207–73 in favor for the bill.

=== June ===
- 17 – The United States Supreme Court, in light of its decision in Romer v. Evans, vacates and remands the United States Court of Appeals for the Sixth Circuit in Equality Foundation of Greater Cincinnati, et al. v. The City of Cincinnati, which had found the city's anti-gay Issue 3 constitutional.

=== July ===
- 1 – The United States Court of Appeals for the Second Circuit vacates and remands the district court in Able v. United States of America, which had ruled the military's gay-exclusionary "don't ask, don't tell" policy unconstitutional.

=== September ===
- 10 – The United States Senate passes the Defense of Marriage Act (85–14) and rejects prohibiting employment discrimination based on sexual orientation in the private sector (49–50).
- 15 – The European Parliament calls for an end to anti-gay discrimination.
- 21 – United States President Bill Clinton signs the Defense of Marriage Act (DOMA) into law. DOMA allows individual states to refuse to recognize same-sex marriages performed in other jurisdictions and creates federal definitions for the terms "marriage" and "spouse".

=== December ===
- 3 – In Baehr v. Miike Hawaii judge Kevin S.C. Chang rules in favor of the plaintiffs and enjoins the state of Hawaii from refusing to issue marriage licenses to same-sex couples. The following day Chang stays his ruling, acknowledging the "legally untenable" position couples would be in should the Hawaii Supreme Court reverse him on appeal.

== Deaths ==
- November 18 – Evelyn Hooker, whose research helped lead to declassifying homosexuality as a mental illness (b. 1907)

== See also ==
- Timeline of LGBT history – timeline of events from 12,000 BCE to present
- LGBT rights by country or territory – current legal status around the world
- LGBT social movements
