= Spiver Gordon =

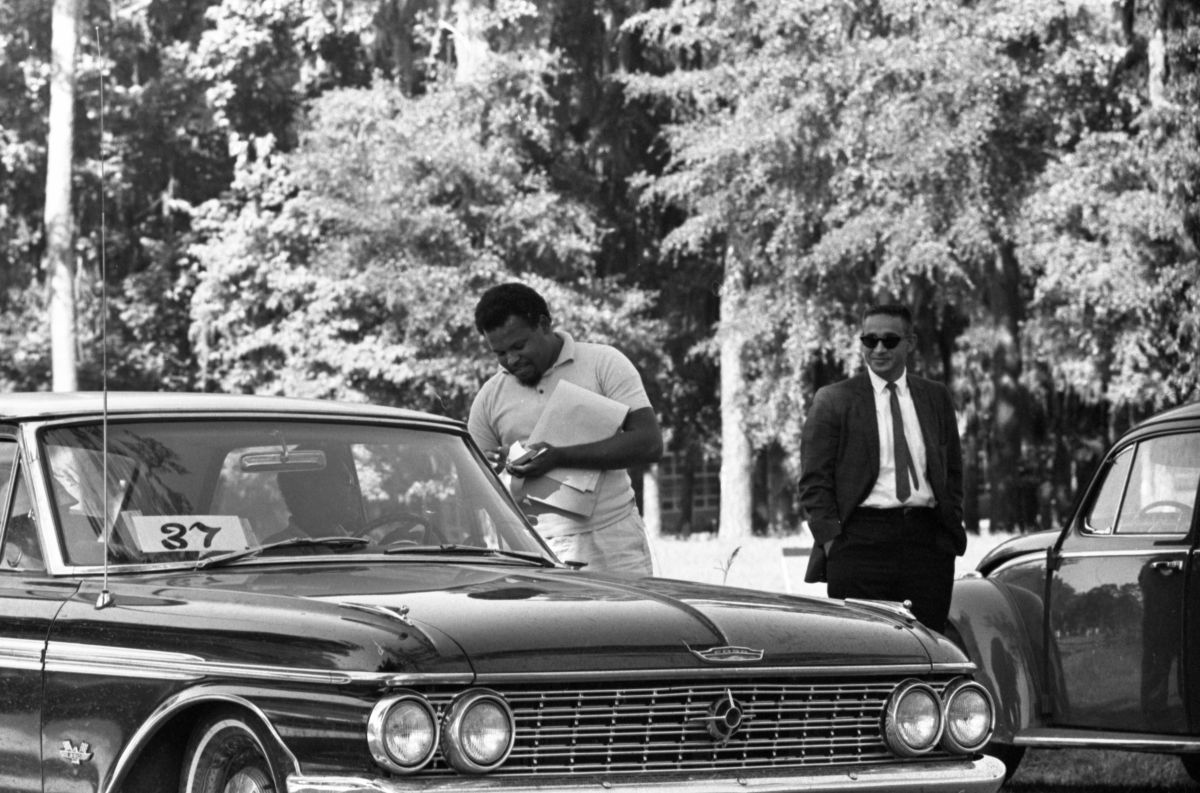
- Gordon handing out leaflets to voters in Florida, 1967.
- Born: August 24, 1939 (age 87); Plaquemine, Louisiana
- Education: Southern University
- Occupations: City Councilman and Civil Rights Activist
- Organization(s): SCLC, CORE, NAACP

Spiver Gordon (born August 24, 1939) is an American politician and civil rights activist most known for his work during the Civil Rights Movement. He began his career in activism while attending Southern University in Baton Rouge, Louisiana, where he worked on voter registration with the NAACP. He then became a field secretary for CORE and worked on voting rights in Louisiana and Florida. In 1968, Gordon moved to Eutaw, Alabama to become the director of the Greene County SCLC Chapter. He has resided in Eutaw ever since.

Gordon has been involved in numerous legal and political controversies concerning voting rights and civil rights organizations in the south from the 1960s to the 2010s.

== Personal life ==
Spiver Gordon has a wife, Barbara, and a son, Kenyatta.

== Civil rights movement ==
Spiver Gordon attended Southern University, but left to participate in the Civil Rights Movement in a full-time capacity. In September 1963, he was arrested alongside 22 others for disturbing the peace and resisting arrest during a voter registration drive in Plaquemine, Louisiana. While working with the NAACP, he participated in the 1963 March on Washington and the 1965 Selma March. Between 1965 and 1968, he worked in Louisiana and Florida, and was involved with registering the first Black voters in St. Francisville and Bristol, Florida. In 1968, he moved to Eutaw in Greene County, Alabama to take over the leadership of the local SCLC chapter and remained in various leadership positions in the organization until 2010. In June 1999, the New York Times described Gordon's role during the 1960s as "a lieutenant in the state [Louisiana] for the Rev. Dr. Martin Luther King Jr. in the fight for voting rights".

== Controversies ==
According to the reverend and civil rights leader Joseph Lowery, Eutaw remained "a segregated island in an integrated sea" even after the Civil Rights Era. While the Greene County commission elected a Black majority in 1969, the Eutaw city council and mayoralty remained all-white until 1984. In 1984, surrounding Black communities were annexed in Eutaw's city limits after a county referendum, and Spiver Gordon became the first Black man elected to the city council. Shortly after these elections, a federal probe into perceived voter fraud in several majority-Black Alabama counties led to his conviction by an all-White jury on four counts of violating absentee ballot rules. He was acquitted of 9 other absentee ballot counts and 2 counts of mail fraud and providing false information to an election official. 7 others were indicted in the probe; 5 were found not guilty, 1 had a mistrial declared, and 1 plead guilty to a misdemeanor charge. In November 1985, federal judge E.B. Haltom Jr. sentenced Gordon to 3 years in prison, fined him $1000, and ordered completion of 500 hours of community service. All but 6 months of the sentence was ultimately suspended. The SCLC President at the time, Rev. Joseph Lowery, criticized the verdict, stating: "this judge held the jury hostage ... I think it's interesting that the Justice Department had to get an all-white jury and a judge who would keep the jury for five days in order to get a conviction". Gordon's defense attorney, J.L. Chestnut, enlisted John England Jr., one of the University of Alabama Law School's first Black graduates, to appeal the case. Gordon remained free and continued to hold his city council seat during the appellate process. In 1988, the 11th Circuit Court of Appeals vacated and overturned the conviction. The 11th Circuit's opinion cited the government's use of all 6 peremptory challenges to exclude Black jurors and held that Gordon's lawyers had demonstrated that the investigation unfairly targeted majority-Black counties, in large part due to a statement by an unidentified Justice Department official who said that the prosecution was "a new policy ... brought on by the arrogance on the part of blacks in these counties".

In December 1997, Gordon was sentenced to 12 months in prison after a Tuscaloosa County jury acquitted him of rape, but convicted him of sexual misconduct against a 16-year-old girl. He ultimately served 6 months of the sentence.

After the 1994 midterm elections, Gordon became one target of a joint federal and state probe into voter fraud, spearheaded by then Alabama Attorney General Jeff Sessions. Similarly to the 1984-1985 case, this investigation targeted Black activists and political figures in several of Alabama's "Black Belt" counties. Margaret Carey-McCray, a former director of the Center for Constitutional Rights in Greenville, Mississippi, criticized the government's efforts, calling them "an abusive effort to crush a successful black voting bloc ... they know the best way to crush the vote is to go after the activists". Others. including Gordon's former defense attorney J.L. Chestnut and Wilcox County Sheriff Prince Arnold claimed that the government was focusing on Black communities while ignoring allegations of voting improprieties in White ones. Chestnut cited legal inaction after absentee irregularities were discovered in the 1992 re-election of White Selma Mayor Joe Smitherman, who had governed the majority-Black town since the 1960s, while Sheriff Arnold argued that federal and state authorities ignored his recommendations to pursue charges against White individuals credibly accused of voter fraud in favor of prosecuting cases against Black Alabamans. Arnold eventually concluded that the investigations were "racially charged". Despite these claims, Spiver Gordon plead guilty in February 1999 to charges that he violated absentee ballot laws. He admitted to asking someone who lived outside Greene County to fill out an absentee ballot and list a Greene County address. Gordon was one of 6 Greene County leaders, including the County Commission Chairman, Garria Spencer, who pleaded guilty to lesser charges of voter fraud stemming from the 1994 election. In June 1999, a federal judge sentenced Gordon to 6 months in prison, imposed a $2000 fine, and ordered 3 years of probation. Gordon also lost his Eutaw City Council seat as a result of the conviction. The NAACP Legal Defense and Educational Fund lawyers who handled the case argued that their attempts to prove selective prosecution against the Greene County defendants, including Gordon, were hampered by the government's refusal to share information and they thusly recommended pleading guilty to lesser charges.

After his prison sentence, Gordon returned to Eutaw, continuing to serve in SCLC leadership positions and working in local politics. His philanthropic work with the local SCLC included a prison ministry, a food pantry, and a youth center. In 2003, Greene County Commissioner Chris Beeker appointed him to an advisory committee meant to quell racial discord caused by a proposal to annex several low-income and predominantly Black communities into Eutaw's city limits.

In late 2009, while serving as the national treasurer of the SCLC, Spiver Gordon, alongside the national board chairman Rev. Raleigh Trammell, was accused of misappropriating up to $560,000 of the organization's funds. The Justice Department investigated claims that Gordon improperly approved checks, diverted cash from national operating accounts into a special account controlled by himself, made false reimbursement claims, and funneled money into his own pockets. The Atlanta Journal-Constitution reported that, over a 3-and-a-half year period, Gordon had claimed reimbursements totaling $236,739 for his Eutaw prison ministry and that $162,927 of national funds were diverted to his local SCLC office. Gordon and Trammell denied the allegations and claimed that they were a concerted effort by opposition factions within the SCLC to challenge their leadership. They argued the funds were for legitimate purposes and promised to fully cooperate with any investigation. In early April 2010, 19 of the national SCLC's 44 board members met via conference call to discuss removing Gordon and Trammell from their positions, which they ultimately agreed to do after a unanimous vote. However, the lack of a quorum from the board was indicative of a split within the organization's leadership. In the months after the vote, two separate boards began meeting, both claiming to be the legitimate leaders of the SCLC. In late April, the faction opposed to Gordon convened in Atlanta, while the faction loyal to him convened in his hometown of Eutaw. A court battle between the two sides ensued, with an Atlanta Superior Court Judge ultimately ruling in September 2010 that the group opposed to Gordon and Trammell's leadership was the rightful board of the SCLC. This group included Martin Luther King III and Bernice King. While Gordon lost his leadership position, the Fulton County District Attorney's office (then led by D.A. Paul Howard) cleared him of all charges, concluded that there was no proof Gordon or Trammell stole funds, and issued a report determining that the expenditures in question were for legitimate and authorized purposes.

== Later life ==
After the 2010 SCLC Scandal, Gordon remained active in Eutaw's civic life. In August 2013, he was honored during a program commemorating civil rights leaders at Plymouth Rock Baptist Church in his birth-town of Plaquemine, Louisiana. In June 2023, the Mayor of Eutaw, Latasha Johnson (who lost re-election to Corey Cockrell in August 2025 and left office on November 1, 2025), awarded Gordon with a key to the city and declared June 11 "Spiver Gordon Day" during an honorary event. The event saw Eutaw civic leaders and other Alabama elected officials praise Gordon for his lifetime of service to civil rights and philanthropic work.
