= United States Navy dog handler hazing scandal =

The United States Navy dog handler hazing scandal was a pattern of misconduct engaged in by members of the United States Navy at Naval Support Activity Bahrain between 2004 and 2006. Naval investigators documented nearly 100 incidents of abuse committed against several members of a Military Working Dog (MWD) unit stationed at the United States military base at Juffair. Documented incidents of abuse include racial intimidation, sexual harassment, physical abuse and anti-gay harassment. One sailor, Master-At-Arms 3rd Class Joseph Rocha, suffered post-traumatic stress disorder because of his abuse at the hands of fellow sailors, and he alleges that another sailor committed suicide because of her treatment. The Navy investigated the allegations in 2007 and documented the abuse, but took little substantive action. However, Pennsylvania Congressman Joe Sestak, a former Vice Admiral, demanded a new examination of the report's findings which led to the disciplining of Rocha's former superior, Chief Petty Officer Michael Toussaint (later Senior Chief Petty Officer). The scandal came to widespread public attention as United States President Barack Obama faced increased pressure to repeal the military's gay-exclusionary policy known as "don't ask, don't tell" (DADT).

== Alleged abuse of Rocha ==
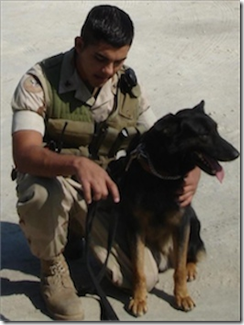
Joseph Rocha handling a Military Working Dog during his assignment in Bahrain

Joseph Rocha joined the United States Navy at the age of 18. He arrived in Bahrain in February 2005 and was assigned to the Military Working Dog unit. Rocha, who is gay but states he adhered to the military's "don't ask, don't tell" (DADT) policy while assigned in Bahrain, became the target of hazing. Hazing, which the Navy defines as "any conduct whereby a military member or members, regardless of service or rank, without proper authority causes another military member or members, regardless of service or rank, to suffer or be exposed to any activity which is cruel, abusive, humiliating, oppressive, demeaning or harmful", is a violation of Navy policy. When Rocha refused to patronize female prostitutes, unit commander then Master-At-Arms 2nd Class Michael Toussaint and others in the unit subjected him to anti-gay taunts and slurs. In another incident he was hogtied with duct tape and rope and locked in a dog kennel filled with feces. He was force-fed dog biscuits while his hands and feet were bound. In an incident Rocha describes as "dehumanizing", he was forced to simulate oral sex on another male sailor while being video taped, supposedly as part of a training exercise. Following 28 months of abuse, Rocha left Bahrain and completed an officers' training boot camp. However, the years of mistreatment left Rocha in need of counseling for post-traumatic stress disorder, and his PTSD in combination with the suicide of his former unit's commander, Petty Officer 1st Class Jennifer Valdivia, and his general disillusionment with the military following his ordeal, led to his coming out to his new commanding officer. Rocha received an honorable discharge under DADT in 2007.

In February 2011, the Navy Administrative Board determined that Rocha's accusations were exaggerated and that Toussaint was never questioned or given the chance to testify in his own defense. The three-man board reviewed two days of testimony and ruled that the case was based largely on uncorroborated hearsay. Some witnesses contradicted themselves and Rocha acknowledged getting some of the facts wrong in his Washington Post article and in his original testimony.

== 2006–2007 investigation ==
In 2006 the Judge Advocate General's office opened an investigation after a sailor new to the unit reported incidents of abuse. The investigation, dated April 12, 2007, documented 93 instances of hazing and other improper conduct that took place within the unit between 2005 and 2006. In addition to Rocha's treatment, the report also documented among other incidents:

- Routine gambling, fraternization and association with prostitutes
- Falsifying paperwork in explosives accountability logs
- Naked female sailors handcuffed together and required to role play an angry lesbian couple as part of another supposed training exercise
- A female sailor was sexually assaulted by another sailor and the assault was not reported up the chain of command

In October 2006, Toussaint was transferred out of the unit and Valdivia was placed in charge. On October 10, she was advised of the investigation and feared that she would be scapegoated for the abuse. In December she advised her chain of command of her intention to leave the Navy. On January 11, 2007, she was relieved of duty and placed on "administrative legal hold", meaning she could not transfer, go on leave or exit the Navy.

Following the investigation, which was completed in June 2007, Toussaint not only was not punished for his role in the hazing, he was promoted to Chief Master-At-Arms and assigned to work with elite Navy SEALS at the United States Naval Special Warfare Development Group at Dam Neck in Virginia. Valdivia, a former Sailor of the Year who was second in command during the abuse and later the unit commander, was charged with failing to control her unit to stop the abuse. She committed suicide by carbon monoxide poisoning at her villa in Bahrain. Her body was found on January 16, 2007. Another sailor, Petty Officer 3rd Class Jake Wilburn, was taken to an Article 15 hearing and dishonorably discharged after Rocha alleged that Wilburn harassed him; Wilburn, who acknowledges participating in some harassment, unsuccessfully appealed his discharge. Wilburn went on to run for, and lose, a seat in the Missouri General Assembly in 2012. The Navy took no further judicial action regarding the report but Toussaint was subject to administrative discipline.

== Follow up ==
In September 2007, Master-at Arms 2nd Class Shaun Hogan, who had been assigned to the MWD unit, gave copies of the Navy report to Youth Radio, a student internship program based in Oakland, California. He had received it in response to a Freedom of Information Act request. Youth Radio posted the redacted report on its website. The case came to the attention of Joe Sestak, then the Congressman from Pennsylvania's 7th congressional district. Sestak wrote to Secretary of the Navy Ray Mabus to request an explanation of why Toussaint was promoted after the hazing incidents and suggested that Valdivia's suicide was related to the incidents. In response, Mabus ordered Chief of Naval Operations Admiral Gary Roughead to re-examine the original investigation. Roughead "found that the incidents were not in keeping with Navy values and standards and violated the Navy's long-standing prohibition against hazing" according to a Navy spokeswoman.

Based on these findings, Mabus considered a court-martial for Toussaint but ultimately decided against it, because of the amount of time that had passed between the incidents and the report, the previous review of the incidents and the short amount of time between Toussaint's return from an overseas deployment and the end of his enlistment. On October 21, the Navy announced that Toussaint would be reassigned to Naval Special Warfare Group 2 in Norfolk, Virginia where he would have no command responsibilities. He received a letter of censure. His planned re-enlistment was denied and he was forced to retire in January 2010. Roughead has also ordered the Naval Criminal Investigative Service to re-examine the case. Sestak has called for Congressional hearings into the hazing allegations.

Both Sestak and the Navy have indicated their belief that the conduct of the MWD unit is an isolated phenomenon and not indicative of any military-wide culture. Sestak characterized the MWD unit as an "aberration" and a "rogue unit". Rear Admiral David Mercer, commander of Navy Region Europe, Africa and Southwest Asia, which oversees the Bahrain base where the incidents occurred, calls the actions of the unit an "anomaly. This was a unit that was improperly led, and apparently the leadership was allowing things to occur — and in some cases encouraging things to occur — that were absolutely unacceptable. [but] I would absolutely deny that there was a culture that promoted this sort of thing."

In January 2010, Chief of Naval Operations Admiral Gary Roughead issued formal letters of counseling to Vice Admiral Robert Conway and Captain Gary Galloway for their actions related to the incidents and subsequent investigation. Conway, former head of Navy Installations Command and the highest-ranking officer to sign off on a June 2007 investigation into the abuse, was chastised for not doing more to ensure that officers in his chain of command were sufficiently addressing the hazing allegations. Conway retired in April 2009. Galloway, former commander of the Bahrain base at the time of the incidents in question, was scolded for not acting quickly and firmly to verify the nature of the alleged behavior and ensure that prohibitions against hazing were enforced. Galloway, as of January 2010, was assigned to Space and Naval Warfare Systems Center San Diego. The letters of counseling will not be included in either officers' permanent personnel files.

The Navy held a retirement pay hearing for Toussaint at Norfolk Naval Station in February 2010. The government argued for him to be retired as a petty officer first class. After two days of testimony and 30 minutes of deliberation, the panel unanimously recommended that Toussaint be retired as a senior chief petty officer. An assistant secretary of the Navy has the final decision. The Servicemembers Legal Defense Network, a legal support and advocacy group for current and former LGBT military personnel, contacted Secretary Mabus with its concerns over this outcome, stating that it sends the message that as long as LGBT people are subject to separation under "don't ask, don't tell" they can be abused by those above them in the chain of command with little regard for consequences. SLDN called upon Mabus to overrule the decision of the retirement panel and "retire Toussaint at the pay-grade at which he last served honorably and that Toussaint be given a discharge characterization that reflects his service record, which is clearly, less than honorable".

In February 2011, the Navy concluded that charges against Toussaint were exaggerated and that Rocha's allegations were either unsubstantiated or embellished. Naval officers involved in investigating the Toussaint case called the original decision to censure Toussaint a "reverse Tailhook" reaction, a reflexive and hasty attempt to prove that the Navy had learned its lesson from the 1991 Tailhook convention sexual harassment scandal. Toussaint is nevertheless still barred re-enlistment.

Juan Garcia, assistant secretary of the Navy for manpower and reserve affairs, decided to allow Toussaint to retire at his current rank of senior chief petty officer. Said Garcia, "Toussaint's conduct as the Leading Chief Petty Officer assigned to the Military Working Dog Division, Naval Security Forces, Bahrain, did not meet the standards expected of senior enlisted leadership in our Navy. The Secretary of the Navy concurred with the CNO's decision that Toussaint not be permitted to re-enlist in the United States Navy. However, when looking at his career in its entirety, I have determined that his conduct did not rise to a level sufficient to warrant retirement in a paygrade less than E-8."

In 2011, Toussaint was awarded the Silver Star for "great battlefield courage" during a special operations raid in Afghanistan.

== Don't ask, don't tell ==
The hazing scandal received widespread media attention at a time when President Barack Obama faced increasing pressure from LGBT rights advocates and members of his own party to end the exclusionary "don't ask, don't tell" policy that prevented gay people from serving openly in the military. Obama promised to repeal DADT during his 2008 presidential campaign and reiterated that promise in a speech to LGBT lobbying organization the Human Rights Campaign delivered on October 10, 2009. LGBT advocates had been dissatisfied with what they perceive as a lack of action within the Obama administration on a series of LGBT issues, including DADT repeal, passage of the Employment Non-discrimination Act which would make discrimination on the basis of sexual orientation illegal, repeal of the Defense of Marriage Act (DOMA) which prevented the federal government from legally recognizing same-sex marriages and the administration's defense of DOMA in a case before the Supreme Court. Democrat Sestak cited DADT as an example of "not adhering to the ideals of our nation" and called for the repeal of DADT before the end of 2009. In the wake of his experiences, Joseph Rocha became an activist seeking the repeal of DADT. On July 15, 2010, Rocha testified about his experiences in Log Cabin Republicans v. United States, a federal lawsuit which sought to strike down DADT.

Congress voted to repeal DADT in December 2010 and President Obama signed the bill into law on December 22, 2010.

== See also ==
- Barry Winchell - American soldier whose 1999 murder sparked national discussion on don't ask, don't tell
- List of hazing deaths in the United States
