= Lewis Slaton =

American jurist (1922–2002)

District Attorney of Fulton County
- In office 1965–1996
- Preceded by: William T. Boyd
- Succeeded by: Paul Howard Jr.

Personal details
- Born: Lewis Roger Slaton Jr. January 22, 1922
- Died: November 18, 2002 (aged 80)
- Education: Emory University (JD)

Lewis Roger Slaton Jr. (January 22, 1922 – November 18, 2002) was an American jurist. He was appointed by Governor Carl Sanders as Solicitor General of Fulton County in 1965. He won the subsequent election in 1966 then was elected as the first District Attorney of the Circuit in 1970. He received no opposition in subsequent elections, and served in the role until 1996. He prosecuted the case in the Atlanta murders of 1979–1981.

In the case Bowers v. Hardwick, Slaton chose not to prosecute the sodomy charge, considering that the warrant had expired, and his own belief that the sodomy law should not be used to prosecute consensual sexual activity.

== In popular culture ==
Slaton was depicted by Rip Torn in the 1985 television miniseries The Atlanta Child Murders, for which he was nominated at the 37th Primetime Emmy Awards for Outstanding Supporting Actor in a Limited Series or Special.

The Fulton County Courthouse was renamed as the Lewis Slaton Courthouse by the Fulton County Commission in 2003.
