= Muth v. Frank =

- Court: United States Court of Appeals for the Seventh Circuit
- Full case name: Allen A. Muth v. Matthew J. Frank, Secretary
- Argued: November 12, 2004
- Decided: June 22, 2005
- Citation: 412 F.3d 808 (7th Cir. 2005)

Case history
- Subsequent history: October 31, 2005: Petition for certiorari denied.

Holding
- The district court's decision is affirmed. Denial of habeas corpus was not unconstitutional.

Court membership
- Judges sitting: William J. Bauer, Daniel Anthony Manion, Terence T. Evans

Case opinions
- Majority: Manion, joined by Bauer
- Concurrence: Evans

Muth v. Frank, 412 F.3d 808 (7th Cir. 2005), was a case in which the United States Court of Appeals for the Seventh Circuit ruled that the denial to an individual of a writ of habeas corpus for violation of Wisconsin's laws criminalizing incest was not unconstitutional. The petitioners relied heavily on the Supreme Court's ruling in Lawrence v. Texas invalidating anti-sodomy laws two years prior, which the Seventh Circuit rejected.

== Background ==
The case originated in the case of Allen Muth and his younger biological sister Patricia Teernstra Muth who together produced four children. Their second child, Tiffany, was developmentally disabled. The couple was late once per month in returning to pick up the child from a babysitter. Someone called child services and stated that the couple had abandoned the child in the house of a babysitter. The abandonment led to the state of Wisconsin successfully seeking to have a court terminate their parental rights in respect to the child, on grounds of their incestuous parenthood as well as the child's condition and evidence that they had neglected her.

== Trial court ==
During trial Dr. David Tick, a professor of genetics, testified against the couple saying the couple's incest conception led to their daughter's poor physical and mental development. The judge terminated the couple's custody of their children. The Muths tried to appeal, claiming that the "termination of their parental rights based on their incestuous parenthood denied them due process of law and their rights to equal protection of the law." The court denied these claims.

This case arose when in a subsequent trial, both were convicted of incest and sentenced to prison. Allen Muth received eight years in prison and Patricia Muth received five years. Finally, Allen Muth applied while imprisoned for a writ of habeas corpus in federal court on the grounds that the state anti-incest laws violated his constitutional rights and hence his imprisonment was illegal.

== Court of Appeals ==
After the Supreme Court ruled in Lawrence v. Texas that sodomy was protected by a right of privacy, Allen Muth appealed his conviction to the Seventh Circuit Court of Appeals relying on the Lawrence decision.

=== Majority Opinion ===
In an opinion by Judge Daniel Anthony Manion, the court ruled that Lawrence had dealt specifically with homosexual sodomy and not other consensual private sexual activity between adults, and was considered narrow and constrained.

The court ruled that Lawrence was not legal precedent to reverse the trial court's ruling. In the majority opinion Judge Daniel Anthony Manion responded to the petitioners reliance on Lawrence by writing:

"The ultimate question then is not whether Lawrence is retroactive, but, rather, whether Muth is a beneficiary of the rule Lawrence announced. He is not. Lawrence did not address the constitutionality of incest statutes. Rather, the statute at issue in Lawrence was one proscribing homosexual sodomy..."

=== Concurring Opinion ===
Judge Terence T. Evans wrote a concurrence in which he agreed Lawrence could not be construed for Muth's claim. He had a similar rationale as Judge Manion's majority opinion, but disagreed with the majority's usage of Lawrence. Evans criticized Judge Manion's opinion of the Lawrence decision as hostile. He believed Manion's opinion had a sense of "disdain" or "unease" of the Lawrence decision being based on the due process rights of homosexuals. He also criticized Judge Manion's repeated use of "homosexual sodomy", believing the term is pejorative.

=== Federal court standing ===
However a closer reading of the decision indicates that standing was another factor. Muth and his sister were convicted under State law, and were convicted before the Federal courts ruled in Lawrence v. Texas. There are only specific circumstances where a federal court may overturn a State decision, and the other legal issue considered was therefore if a federal court could intervene to overturn a State ruling, based on a matter that was a crime at the time of conviction:

"AEDPA instructs a federal court reviewing a state conviction on habeas review to determine whether the decision of the last state court to adjudicate the merits of the petitioner's claim was reasonably correct as of the time the decision was made. As discussed below, only in limited circumstances are legal developments occurring after the state court's decision considered. Lawrence was decided after Muth's conviction and the exhaustion of his state post-conviction remedies. Muth has not identified, and we have not found, a federal court decision (and certainly not a Supreme Court decision) prior to the Wisconsin Court of Appeals decision in Muth I that even discussed whether criminal penalties for incest might be unconstitutional."
