= Witt v. Department of the Air Force =

- Court: United States Court of Appeals for the Ninth Circuit
- Full case name: Margaret Witt, Major, Plaintiff-Appellant, v. Department of the Air Force; Robert M. Gates, Secretary of Defense; Michael W. Wynn, Secretary, Department of the Air Force; Mary L. Walker, Colonel, Commander, 446th Aeromedical Evacuation Squadron, McChord AFB, Defendants-Appellees.
- Decided: May 21, 2008
- Citation: 527 F.3d 806 (9th Cir. 2008)

Case history
- Prior actions: Suit dismissed, 444 F.Supp.2d 1138 (W.D. Wash. 2006)
- Subsequent actions: Judgement for plaintiff on remand, 739 F.Supp.2d 1308 (W.D. Wash. 2010); Settled and appeal dropped (2011)

Court membership
- Judges sitting: William C. Canby, Susan P. Graber, Ronald M. Gould

Case opinions
- 10 U.S.C. § 654, the law preventing openly homosexual people from serving in the United States military is subject to "heightened scrutiny". Western District of Washington reversed and remanded.

Witt v. Department of the Air Force, 527 F.3d 806 (9th Cir. 2008) is a federal lawsuit that challenged the constitutionality of 10 U.S.C. § 654, the law, since repealed, that excluded openly homosexual people from serving in the United States military, commonly known as "Don't ask, don't tell" (DADT). The United States Court of Appeals for the Ninth Circuit ruled in 2008 that under Lawrence v. Texas DADT constitutes an "[attempt] to intrude upon the personal and private lives of homosexuals" and it is subject to "heightened scrutiny", meaning that the government "must advance an important governmental interest, the intrusion must significantly further that interest, and the intrusion must be necessary to further that interest."

The ruling made it more difficult for service members in the Ninth Circuit's jurisdiction to be expelled under DADT, requiring the government to show actual harm in the specific unit in question. The case ended in a settlement announced on May 10, 2011.

== Background ==
Margaret Witt was a major in the United States Air Force, having joined in 1987. In 1995 she transferred from active duty to the Reserves. She was in a committed relationship with another woman from July 1997 through August 2003. While they were together, Witt and her partner lived 250 miles away from the base to which Witt was assigned and Witt never disclosed her sexual orientation to anyone in the military during her service. In 2004, the husband of another woman whom Witt had begun dating outed her to the Air Force. In July 2004 Witt was informed that she was being investigated for homosexuality and in November Witt was suspended from duty, which meant that she could not receive pay, accrue points toward promotion, or accrue retirement benefits. In March 2006 Witt was advised that discharge proceedings were being initiated against her for homosexuality and in April of that year she filed suit in the United States District Court for the Western District of Washington seeking declaratory and injunctive relief on the grounds that DADT violates substantive due process, the Equal Protection Clause, and procedural due process. In September 2006 a military board recommended that she be honorably discharged because of her homosexuality. In July 2007 the Secretary of the Air Force ordered her honorable discharge. District judge Ronald B. Leighton dismissed Witt's suit under Federal Rule of Civil Procedure 12(b)(6) for "failure to state a claim". A three judge panel of the Ninth Circuit heard the appeal on November 5, 2007, and issued its ruling on May 21, 2008.

== Ninth Circuit ruling ==
The Ninth Circuit panel vacated and remanded the District Court ruling in part, and affirmed the lower court in part. Specifically, the court reinstated Witt's substantive due process and procedural due process claims and affirmed the dismissal of her Equal Protection claim.

The court based its ruling on an analysis of Lawrence v. Texas. This 2003 Supreme Court case found that the sodomy law of Texas violated the Fourteenth Amendment. Although the Supreme Court did not say so, the Ninth Circuit found that it had decided Lawrence by applying "heightened scrutiny". Although the terms "heightened scrutiny" and "intermediate scrutiny" are often used interchangeably, it is unclear whether the two are legally the same. In determining that Lawrence requires that DADT be subjected to heightened scrutiny, the Ninth Circuit found that there must be an "important" governmental interest at issue, that DADT must "significantly" further the governmental interest, and that there can be no less intrusive way for the government to advance that interest.

The panel affirmed the dismissal of Witt's Equal Protection claim because the Supreme Court in Lawrence declined to address Equal Protection.

== Outcome ==
The Obama administration declined to appeal, allowing a May 3, 2009, deadline to pass and leaving Witt as binding on the entire Ninth Circuit. The case headed to trial back in district court. Witt has been cited as precedent in Log Cabin Republicans v. United States, a case in the United States District Court for the Central District of California–over which the Ninth Circuit has appellate jurisdiction–which seeks a national injunction against the enforcement of DADT.

Witt returned to the trial court on September 13, 2010. On September 24, 2010, District Judge Ronald B. Leighton ruled that Witt's constitutional rights had been violated by her discharge and that she must be reinstated to the Air Force. The government filed an appeal with the Ninth Circuit on November 23, but made no attempt to have the trial court's ruling stayed pending the outcome. Witt had hoped to return to her unit no later than January 2011.

In a settlement announced on May 10, 2011, the Air Force agreed to drop its appeal and remove Witt's discharge from her military record. She will retire with full benefits.
