= Lawrence v. Texas =

2003 U.S. Supreme Court case on anti-sodomy laws

- Supreme Court of the United States

Argued March 26, 2003 Decided June 26, 2003
- Full case name: John Geddes Lawrence and Tyron Garner v. Texas
- Docket no.: 02-102
- Citations: 539 U.S. 558 (more) 123 S. Ct. 2472; 156 L. Ed. 2d 508; 2003 U.S. LEXIS 5013; 71 U.S.L.W. 4574; 2003 Cal. Daily Op. Service 5559; 2003 Daily Journal DAR 7036; 16 Fla. L. Weekly Fed. S 427
- Argument: Oral argument

Case history
- Prior: Defendants convicted, Harris County Criminal Court (1999), rev'd, 2000 WL 729417 (Tex. App. 2000) (depublished), aff'd en banc, 41 S.W.3d 349 (Tex. App. 2001), review denied (Tex. App. 2002), cert. granted, 537 U.S. 1044 (2002).
- Subsequent: Complaint dismissed, 2003 WL 22453791, 2003 Tex. App. LEXIS 9191 (Tex. App. 2003)

Questions presented
- 1. Whether the petitioners' criminal convictions under the Texas "Homosexual Conduct" law—which criminalizes sexual intimacy by same-sex couples, but not identical behavior by different-sex couples—violate the Fourteenth Amendment guarantee of equal protection of the laws; 2. Whether the petitioners' criminal convictions for adult consensual sexual intimacy in their home violate their vital interests in liberty and privacy protected by the Due Process Clause of the Fourteenth Amendment; 3. Whether Bowers v. Hardwick should be overruled.

Holding
- The Texas statute making it a crime for two persons of the same sex to engage in certain intimate sexual conduct violates the Due Process Clause. Court of Appeals for the Fourteenth District of Texas reversed and remanded. Bowers v. Hardwick overruled.

Court membership
- Chief Justice William Rehnquist Associate Justices John P. Stevens · Sandra Day O'Connor; Antonin Scalia · Anthony Kennedy; David Souter · Clarence Thomas; Ruth Bader Ginsburg · Stephen Breyer

Case opinions
- Majority: Kennedy, joined by Stevens, Souter, Ginsburg, Breyer
- Concurrence: O'Connor (in judgment)
- Dissent: Scalia, joined by Rehnquist, Thomas
- Dissent: Thomas

Laws applied
- U.S. Const. amend. XIV; Tex. Penal Code § 21.06(a) (2003)
- This case overturned a previous ruling or rulings
- Bowers v. Hardwick (1986)

Lawrence v. Texas, 539 U.S. 558 (2003), is a landmark decision of the United States Supreme Court in which the Court ruled that U.S. state laws criminalizing sodomy between consenting adults are unconstitutional. (Note: The judgment does not recognize a constitutional right to certain sexual activities such as prostitution, bestiality, and incest, due to other metrics, such as the perceived inherent harm that these activities carry.) The Court reaffirmed the concept of a "right to privacy" that earlier cases had found the United States Constitution provides, even though it is not explicitly enumerated. It based its ruling on the notions of personal autonomy to define one's own relationships and of American traditions of non-interference with any or all forms of private sexual activities between consenting adults.

In 1998, John Geddes Lawrence Jr. was arrested along with Tyron Garner at Lawrence's apartment in Harris County, Texas. Garner's former boyfriend had called the police, claiming that there was a man with a weapon in the apartment. Sheriff's deputies said they found the men engaging in sexual intercourse. Lawrence and Garner were charged with a misdemeanor under Texas' anti-sodomy law; both pleaded no contest and received a fine. Assisted by the American civil rights organization Lambda Legal, Lawrence and Garner appealed their sentences to the Texas Courts of Appeals, which ruled in 2000 that the sodomy law was unconstitutional. Texas appealed to have the court rehear the case en banc, and in 2001 it overturned its prior judgment and upheld the law. Lawrence appealed this decision to the Texas Court of Criminal Appeals, which denied his request for appeal. Lawrence then appealed to the U.S. Supreme Court, which agreed to hear his case.

The Supreme Court struck down the sodomy law in Texas in a 6–3 decision, and by extension invalidated sodomy laws in 13 other states, thus protecting from governmental regulation throughout the U.S. all forms of private, consensual sexual activity between adults. In the same case, the Court overturned its previous ruling in the 1986 case Bowers v. Hardwick, where it had upheld a challenged Georgia statute and did not find a constitutional protection of sexual privacy. It explicitly overruled Bowers, holding that the previous ruling had viewed the liberty interest too narrowly. The Court held that intimate consensual sexual conduct was part of the liberty protected by substantive due process under the Due Process Clause of the Fourteenth Amendment to the U.S. Constitution.

The case attracted much public attention, and 33 amici curiae ("friends of the court") briefs were filed. Its outcome was celebrated by gay rights advocates, and set the stage for further reconsideration of standing law, including the landmark cases of United States v. Windsor (2013), which invalidated Section 3 of the Defense of Marriage Act, and Obergefell v. Hodges (2015), which recognized same-sex marriage as a fundamental right under the United States Constitution.

== Background ==
Legal punishments for sodomy often included heavy fines, prison sentences, or both, with some states, beginning with Illinois in 1827, denying other rights, such as suffrage, to anyone convicted of the crime of sodomy. In the late 19th and early 20th centuries, several states imposed various eugenics laws against anyone deemed to be a "sexual pervert". As late as 1970, Connecticut denied a driver's license to a man for being an "admitted homosexual".

As of 1960, every state had an anti-sodomy law. In 1961, the American Law Institute's Model Penal Code advocated the repeal of sodomy laws as they applied to private, adult, consensual behavior. Two years later the American Civil Liberties Union (ACLU) took its first major case in opposition to these laws.

In Griswold v. Connecticut (1965), the Supreme Court struck down a law barring the use of contraceptives by married couples. In Griswold, the Supreme Court recognized for the first time that couples, at least married couples, had a right to privacy, drawing on the Fourth Amendment's protection of private homes from searches and seizures without a warrant based on probable cause, the Fourteenth Amendment's guarantee of due process of law in the states, and the Ninth Amendment's assurance that rights not specified in the Constitution are "retained by the people". Eisenstadt v. Baird (1972) expanded the scope of sexual privacy rights to unmarried persons. In 1973, in Roe v. Wade the US Supreme court extended that right to privacy to protect a woman's right to have an abortion, although the extent to which that might be regulated by the government varied, with almost absolute protection in the first trimester, and allowing for increasing regulation as the pregnancy progressed.

In Bowers v. Hardwick (1986), the Supreme Court heard a constitutional challenge to sodomy laws brought by a man who had been arrested, but was not prosecuted, for engaging in oral sex with another man in his home. The Court rejected this challenge in a 5 to 4 decision. Justice Byron White's majority opinion emphasized that Eisenstadt and Roe had only recognized a right to engage in procreative sexual activity, and that long-standing moral antipathy toward homosexual sodomy was enough to argue against the notion of a right to sodomy. Justice Blackmun, writing in dissent, argued that Eisenstadt held that the Constitution protects people as individuals, not as family units. He then reasoned that because state intrusions are equally burdensome on an individual's personal life regardless of his marital status or sexual orientation, there is no reason to treat the rights of citizens in same-sex couples any differently.

By the time of the Lawrence decision, ten states—Alabama, Florida, Idaho, Louisiana, Mississippi, North Carolina, South Carolina, Michigan, Utah, and Virginia—still banned consensual sodomy without respect to the sex of those involved, and four—Texas, Kansas, Oklahoma, and Missouri (partially)—prohibited same-sex couples from engaging in anal and oral sex.

== History ==
=== Arrest of Lawrence and Garner ===
On September 17, 1998, John Geddes Lawrence Jr., a gay medical technologist, was hosting two gay acquaintances, Tyron Garner and Robert Eubanks, at his apartment at 794 East Normandy Street, in northeast Harris County, Texas, east of the Houston city limits. Lawrence and Eubanks had been friends for more than 20 years. Garner and Eubanks had had an intermittent romantic relationship since 1990. Lacking transportation home, the guests were preparing to spend the night. Eubanks, who had been drinking heavily, left to purchase a soda from a nearby vending machine. Apparently outraged that Lawrence had been flirting with Garner, he called police and reported "a black male going crazy with a gun" at Lawrence's apartment.

Four Harris County sheriff's deputies responded within minutes and Eubanks pointed them to the apartment. They entered the unlocked apartment toward 11 p.m. with their weapons drawn. In accordance with police procedures, the first to arrive, Joseph Quinn, took the lead both in approaching the scene and later in determining what charges to bring. He later reported seeing Lawrence and Garner having anal sex in the bedroom. A second officer reported seeing them engaged in oral sex, and two others did not report seeing the pair having sex. Lawrence repeatedly challenged the police for entering his home. Quinn had discretionary authority to charge them for a variety of offenses and to determine whether to arrest them. When Quinn considered charging them with having sex in violation of state law, he had to get an Assistant District Attorney to check the statutes to be certain they covered sexual activity inside a residence. He was told that Texas' anti-sodomy statute, the "Homosexual Conduct" law, made it a Class C misdemeanor if someone "engages in deviate sexual intercourse with another individual of the same sex". The statute, Chapter 21, Sec. 21.06 of the Texas Penal Code, had been adopted in 1973 when the state revised its criminal code to end its proscription on heterosexual anal and oral intercourse.

Quinn decided to arrest Lawrence and Garner and charge them with having "deviate sex". In the separate arrest reports he filed for each, he wrote that he had seen the arrestee "engaged in deviate sexual conduct namely, anal sex, with another man". Lawrence and Garner were held in jail overnight. At a hearing the next day, they pleaded not guilty to a charge of "homosexual conduct". They were released toward midnight, after posting a bail of $200. Eubanks pleaded no contest to charges of filing a false police report. He was sentenced to 30 days in jail but was released after serving just 15 days of his sentence.

At the time of the arrest, prosecuting this offense was rare for people in their own residences. District Attorney John B. Holmes, said that only "two or three" sodomy cases had been pursued in the county since 1958, and all involved inmates in the county jail.

=== Prosecution and appeals ===
The gay rights advocates from Lambda Legal litigating the case convinced Lawrence and Garner not to contest the charges and to plead no contest instead. On November 20, Lawrence and Garner pleaded no contest to the charges and waived their right to a trial. Justice of the Peace Mike Parrott found them guilty and imposed a $100 fine and court costs of $41.25 on each defendant. When the defense attorneys realized that the fine was below the minimum required to permit them to appeal the convictions, they asked the judge to impose a higher penalty. Parrott, well aware that the attorneys intended to use the case to raise a constitutional challenge, increased it to $125 with the agreement of the prosecutor.

To appeal, Lawrence and Garner needed to have their cases tried in Harris County Criminal Court. Their attorneys asked the court to dismiss the charges against them on Fourteenth Amendment equal protection grounds, claiming that the law was unconstitutional since it prohibited sodomy between same-sex couples, but not between heterosexual couples. They also asserted a right to privacy and that the Supreme Court's decision in Bowers v. Hardwick that found no privacy protection for consensual sex between homosexuals was "wrongly decided". On December 22, Judge Sherman Ross denied the defense motions to dismiss. The defendants again pleaded "no contest". Ross fined them $200 each, the amount agreed upon in advance by both sides.

A three-judge panel of the Texas Fourteenth Court of Appeals heard the case on November 3, 1999. Their 2–1 decision issued on June 8, 2000, ruled the Texas law was unconstitutional. Justice John S. Anderson and Chief Justice Paul Murphy found that the law violated the 1972 Equal Rights Amendment to the Texas Constitution, which bars discrimination based on sex, race, color, creed, or national origin. J. Harvey Hudson dissented. The Court of Appeals decided to review the case en banc. On March 15, 2001, without hearing oral arguments, it reversed the three-judge panel's decision and upheld the law's constitutionality 7–2, denying both the substantive due process and equal protection arguments. Attorneys for Lawrence and Garner asked the Texas Court of Criminal Appeals, the highest appellate court in Texas for criminal matters, to review the case. After a year's delay, on April 17, 2002, that request was denied. Lambda Legal's Harlow called that decision "a major abdication of judicial responsibility". Bill Delmore, the Harris County prosecutor who argued the case, called the judges "big chickens" and said: "They have a history of avoiding the hot potato cases if they can."

== Consideration by the Supreme Court ==
In a petition for certiorari filed in the U.S. Supreme Court on July 16, 2002, Lambda Legal attorneys asked the Court to consider:

1. Whether the petitioners' criminal convictions under the Texas "Homosexual Conduct" law—which criminalizes sexual intimacy by same-sex couples, but not identical behavior by different-sex couples—violate the Fourteenth Amendment guarantee of equal protection of the laws;
2. Whether the petitioners' criminal convictions for adult consensual sexual intimacy in their home violate their vital interests in liberty and privacy protected by the Due Process Clause of the Fourteenth Amendment;
3. Whether Bowers v. Hardwick should be overruled.

On December 2, 2002, the Court agreed to hear the case. Lambda Legal coordinated the submission of sixteen amicus curiae briefs to complement their own brief. Submitting organizations included the American Bar Association, the American Psychological Society, the American Public Health Association, the Cato Institute, the Log Cabin Republicans, a group of history professors, and a group of religious denominations. An op-ed in support by former Senator Alan Simpson appeared in The Wall Street Journal on the morning scheduled for oral argument. The attorneys for Texas did not control the amicus briefs submitted in support of their position by representatives of religious and social conservatism, including Jay Alan Sekulow and Robert P. George. Several, including that of Liberty Counsel, depicted homosexuals as self-destructive, disease-prone, and promiscuous. The states of Alabama, South Carolina, and Utah advised the Court that unlike heterosexual sodomy, homosexual sodomy had "severe physical, emotional, psychological, and spiritual consequences".

At oral argument on March 26, 2003, Paul M. Smith, an experienced litigator who had argued eight cases before the Supreme Court, spoke on behalf of the plaintiffs. Texas Attorney General John Cornyn, then a candidate for the U.S. Senate, refused to have his office argue the case. Charles A. Rosenthal, District Attorney of Harris County, represented the state. His performance was later described as "the worst oral argument in years", but some believe his lack of preparation reflected his lack of enthusiasm for the statute he was defending.

== Decision ==
On June 26, 2003, the Supreme Court issued a 6–3 decision in favor of Lawrence that struck down Texas's statute. Five justices held it violated the Due Process Clause, while a sixth, Sandra Day O'Connor, held it violated the Equal Protection Clause.

=== Opinion of the Court ===
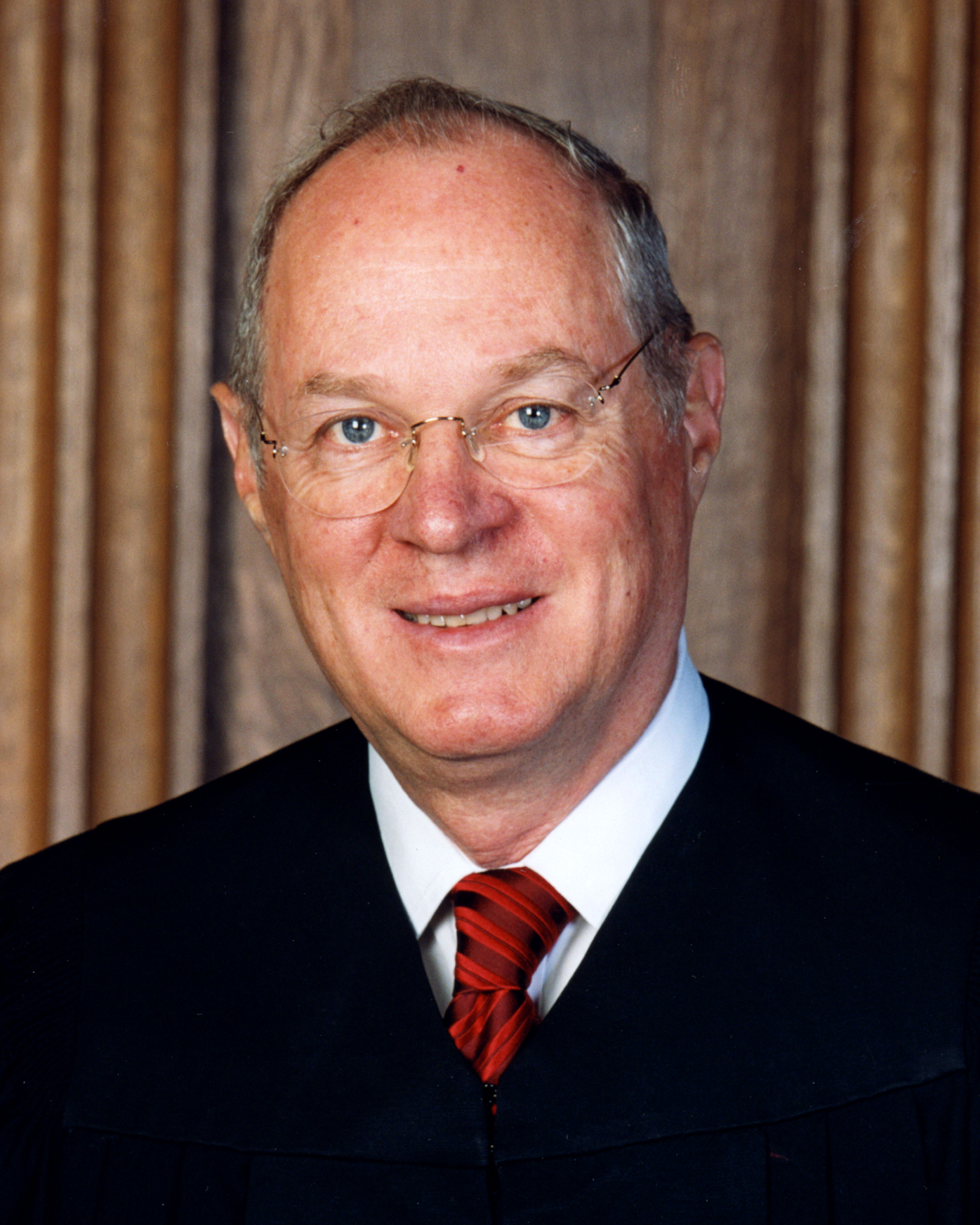
Justice Anthony Kennedy, the author of the Court's opinion in Lawrence v. Texas

Five justices formed the majority and joined an opinion written by Justice Anthony Kennedy. The Court ruled that Texas's law prohibiting private homosexual activity between consenting adults violated the Due Process Clause of the Fourteenth Amendment to the U.S. Constitution. The Court did not describe private sexual activity as a fundamental right requiring the "strict scrutiny" standard of judicial review, but rather focused on why its previous decision in Bowers v. Hardwick had been wrong.

First, the Court stated that its decision in Bowers went against its statements in cases involving child-rearing (Pierce v. Society of Sisters and Meyer v. Nebraska), contraception (Griswold v. Connecticut and Eisenstadt v. Baird), and abortion (Roe v. Wade) that the Constitution protects a right to privacy and personal autonomy. Next, Kennedy wrote that in Bowers the Court had misread the historical record regarding laws criminalizing homosexual relations. He stated that, after further research, the Court had found that historical American anti-sodomy laws had been directed at "nonprocreative sexual activity more generally," rather than specifically at homosexual acts, contrary to the Court's conclusions in Bowers. Combined with the fact that these laws were often unenforced, the Court saw this as constituting a tradition of avoiding interference with private sexual activity between consenting adults.

Lastly, Kennedy noted that Bowers's jurisprudential foundation had been weakened by two subsequent cases involving sexuality (Planned Parenthood v. Casey and Romer v. Evans), and that the reasoning of Bowers had been criticized in the United States and rejected by most other developed Western countries. For this reason, Kennedy stated that there was a jurisprudential basis to think that it should be "an integral part of human freedom" for consenting adults to choose to privately engage in sexual activity.

The present case does not involve minors. It does not involve persons who might be injured or coerced or who are situated in relationships where consent might not easily be refused. It does not involve public conduct or prostitution. It does not involve whether the government must give formal recognition to any relationship that homosexual persons seek to enter. The case does involve two adults who, with full and mutual consent from each other, engaged in sexual practices common to a homosexual lifestyle. The petitioners are entitled to respect for their private lives. The State cannot demean their existence or control their destiny by making their private sexual conduct a crime. Their right to liberty under the Due Process Clause gives them the full right to engage in their conduct without intervention of the government. "It is a promise of the Constitution that there is a realm of personal liberty which the government may not enter." The Texas statute furthers no legitimate state interest which can justify its intrusion into the personal and private life of the individual.

— Lawrence, 539 U.S. at 578 (citation omitted).

Kennedy reviewed the assumption the court made in Bowers, using the words of Chief Justice Burger's concurring opinion in that case, that "Condemnation of [homosexual practices] is firmly rooted in Judeo-Christian moral and ethical standards." He reviewed the history of legislation that criminalized certain sexual practices, but without regard for the gender of those involved. He cited the Model Penal Code's recommendations since 1955, the Wolfenden Report of 1957, and a 1981 decision of the European Court of Human Rights in Case 7525/76 Dudgeon v United Kingdom.

=== O'Connor's concurrence ===
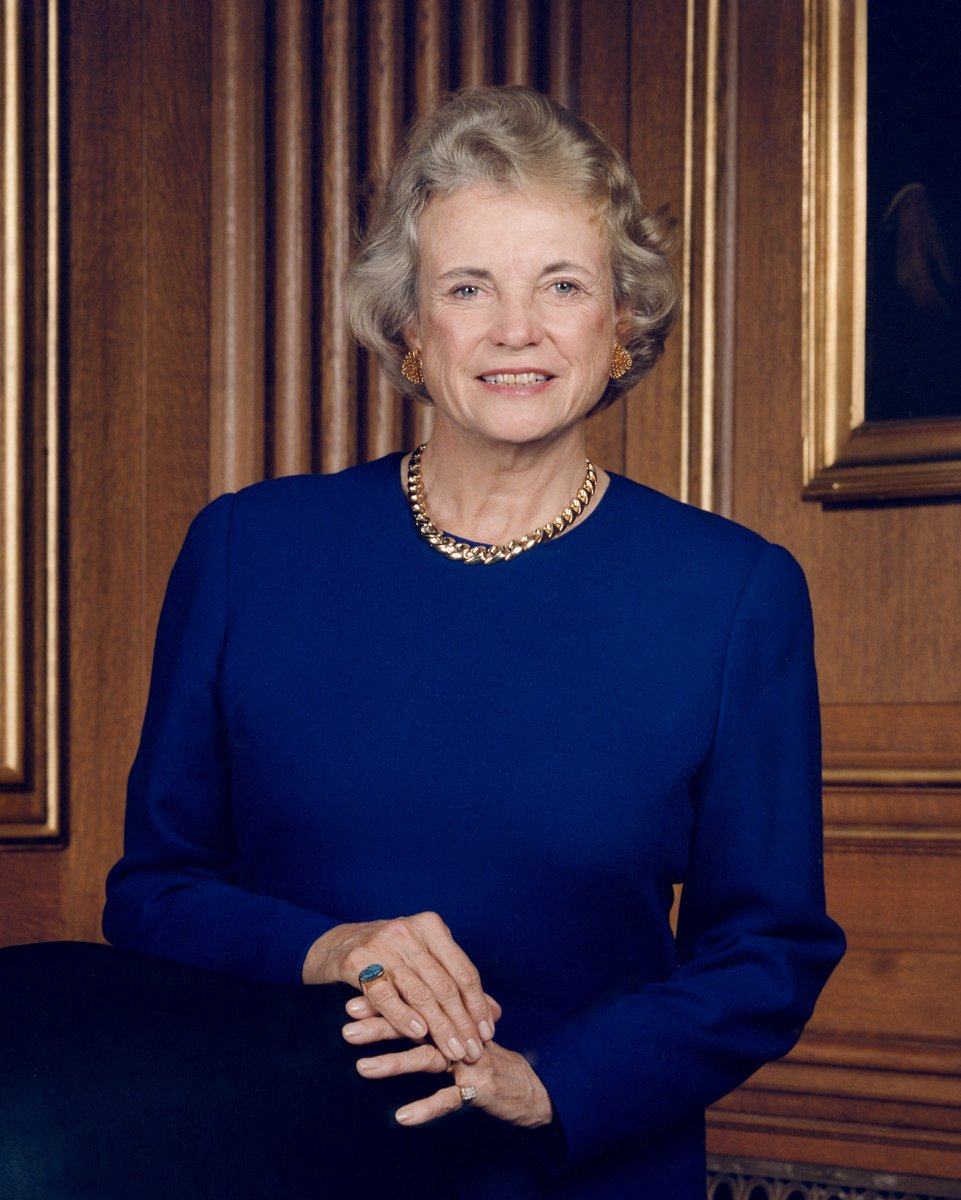
Justice O'Connor, argued the statute was unconstitutional under the Equal Protection Clause rather than due process and would have kept Bowers intact.

Justice Sandra Day O'Connor only concurred in the judgment and offered a different rationale for invalidating the Texas sodomy statute. She disagreed with the overturning of Bowers—she had been in the Bowers majority—and disputed the court's invocation of due process guarantees of liberty in this context. Rather than including sexuality within protected liberty, she would strike down the law as violating the equal protection clause because it criminalized male–male but not male–female sodomy. O'Connor maintained that a sodomy law that was neutral both in effect and application might be constitutional, but that there was little to fear because "democratic society" would not tolerate it for long. O'Connor noted that a law limiting marriage to heterosexual couples would pass rational scrutiny as long as it was designed to "preserv[e] the traditional institution of marriage" and not simply based on the state's dislike of homosexual persons.

=== Scalia's dissent ===
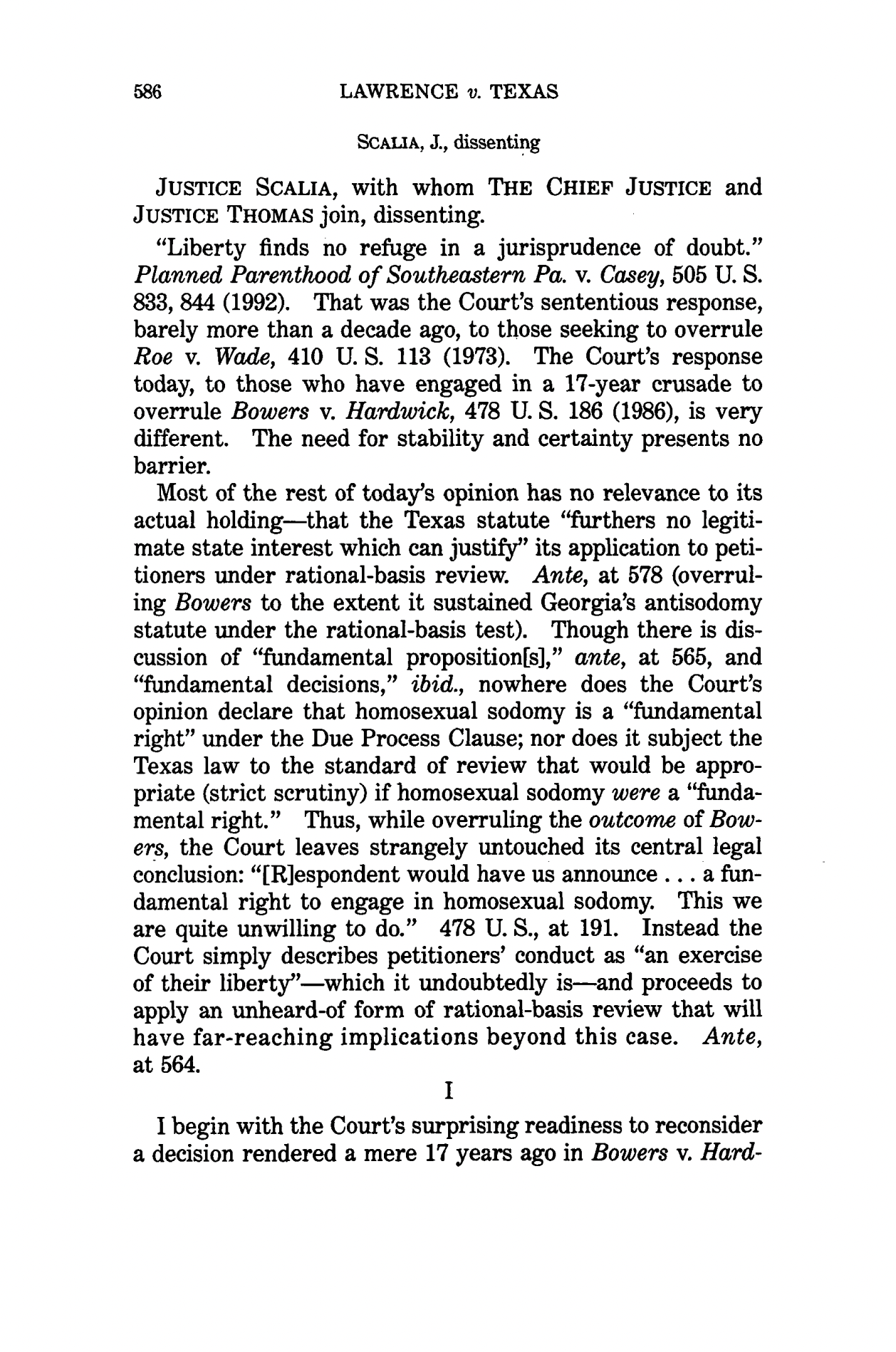
Opening page of Scalia's dissent in Lawrence v. Texas

Justice Antonin Scalia wrote a dissent, which Chief Justice William H. Rehnquist and Justice Clarence Thomas joined. Scalia objected to the Court's decision to revisit Bowers, pointing out many decisions from lower courts that relied on Bowers that might now need to be reconsidered. He noted that the same rationale used to overturn Bowers could have been used to overturn Roe v. Wade, which some of the Justices in the majority in Lawrence had upheld in Planned Parenthood v. Casey (1992). Scalia also criticized the majority opinion for failing to give the same respect to stare decisis that three of those in the majority had insisted on in Casey. O'Connor's concurrence noted that Scalia's dissent conceded that if cases such as Romer v. Evans "have stare decisis effect, Texas' sodomy law would not pass scrutiny under the Equal Protection Clause, regardless of the type of rational basis review" applied.

Scalia wrote that if the court was not prepared to validate laws based on moral choices as it had done in Bowers, state laws against bigamy, same-sex marriage, adult incest, prostitution, masturbation, adultery, fornication, bestiality, and obscenity would not prove sustainable.

He wrote that:

Today's opinion is the product of a Court, which is the product of a law-profession culture, that has largely signed on to the so-called homosexual agenda, by which I mean the agenda promoted by some homosexual activists directed at eliminating the moral opprobrium that has traditionally attached to homosexual conduct. ... [T]he Court has taken sides in the culture war, departing from its role of assuring, as a neutral observer, that the democratic rules of engagement are observed.

He cited the majority opinion's concern that the criminalization of sodomy could be the basis for discrimination against homosexuals as evidence that the majority ignored the views of most Americans:

So imbued is the Court with the law profession's anti-anti-homosexual culture, that it is seemingly unaware that the attitudes of that culture are not obviously "mainstream"; that in most States what the Court calls "discrimination" against those who engage in homosexual acts is perfectly legal.

He continued: "Let me be clear that I have nothing against homosexuals, or any other group, promoting their agenda through normal democratic means." The majority's "invention of a brand-new 'constitutional right'", he wrote, showed it was "impatient of democratic change".

=== Thomas's dissent ===
Justice Thomas wrote in a separate, two-paragraph dissent that the sodomy law the Court struck down was "uncommonly silly", a phrase drawn from Justice Potter Stewart's dissent in Griswold v. Connecticut (1965). Justice Thomas added that if he were a member of the Texas Legislature, he would vote to repeal the law. The Justice opined that "punishing someone for expressing his sexual preference through noncommercial consensual conduct with another adult does not appear to be a worthy way to expend valuable law enforcement resources". Nevertheless, Thomas voted to uphold the constitutionality of the Texas sodomy law because he could find "no general right of privacy" in the Constitution.

== Reactions ==
President George W. Bush's press secretary Ari Fleischer refused to comment on the decision, noting only that the administration had not filed a brief in the case. As governor, Bush had opposed the repeal of the Texas sodomy provision, which he called a "symbolic gesture of traditional values". After quoting Fleischer calling it "a state matter", Linda Greenhouse, writing in The New York Times, commented: "In fact, the decision today ... took what had been a state-by-state matter and pronounced a binding national constitutional principle."

Lambda Legal's lead attorney in the case, Ruth Harlow, stated in an interview after the ruling that "the court admitted its mistake in 1986, admitted it had been wrong then ... and emphasized today that gay Americans, like all Americans, are entitled to full respect and equal claim to [all] constitutional rights."

Professor Laurence Tribe has written that Lawrence "may well be remembered as the Brown v. Board of Education of gay and lesbian America". Jay Alan Sekulow of the American Center for Law and Justice has referred to the decision as having "changed the status of homosexual acts and changed a previous ruling of the Supreme Court ... this was a drastic rewrite". Political science professor Robert Goidel disagreed with the comparison to Brown arguing the Court was catching up to evolving social acceptance of homosexuality rather than moving the law ahead of social attitudes.

The end result of Lawrence v. Texas was "like the Roe v. Wade of the homosexual issue", according to Peter LaBarbera of the Culture and Family Institute and Americans for Truth about Homosexuality, an organization deemed to be an anti-gay hate group by the Southern Poverty Law Center.

President of the United States Conference of Catholic Bishops, Wilton Gregory, released a statement that the Supreme Court decision was to be deplored.

== Subsequent cases ==
=== Sexual privacy ===
==== Age of consent laws ====
Lawrence invalidated age of consent laws that differed based on the relative sexes of the partners. The day after the Lawrence decision, the Supreme Court ordered the State of Kansas to review its 1999 "Romeo and Juliet" law that reduces the punishment for a teenager under 18 years of age who has consensual sexual relations with a minor no more than four years their junior but explicitly excludes same-sex conduct from the sentence reduction. In 2004, the Kansas Appeals Court upheld the law as is, but the Kansas Supreme Court unanimously reversed the lower court's ruling on October 21, 2005, in State v. Limon.

==== Consensual incest ====
In Muth v. Frank (2005), a man convicted of criminal behavior by having an incestuous relationship in Wisconsin appealed his ruling in an attempt to apply the logic of sexual privacy in Lawrence. The Seventh Circuit declined to extend the right of privacy stated in Lawrence to cases of consensual adult incest. The case was distinguished because the parties were not similarly situated since there is in the latter case an enhanced possibility of genetic mutation of a possible offspring as suggested by geneticists who were witnesses at the trial.

==== Fornication ====
In Martin v. Ziherl, the Supreme Court of Virginia ruled the state's fornication law unconstitutional relying on Lawrence and the right to privacy.

==== Teacher-student relationships ====
The Connecticut Supreme Court rejected an argument based on Lawrence that a high school teacher had a constitutional right to engage in sexual activity with his consent-aged students. The court rejected the teacher's privacy and liberty arguments in the context of an "inherently coercive relationship wherein consent might not easily be refused".

==== Adult entertainment ====
Upon rehearing Williams v. Pryor after Lawrence, the Eleventh Circuit Court of Appeals upheld Alabama's ban on the sale of sex toys. Facing comparable facts, the Fifth Circuit struck down Texas's sex toy ban holding that "morality is an insufficient justification for a statute" and "interests in 'public morality' cannot constitutionally sustain the statute after Lawrence".

==== Bestiality ====
Joanna Grossman wrote soon after the decision that Lawrence v. Texas should pose no serious obstacle to bestiality prosecutions, because such laws "plainly can be upheld on a 'cruelty to animals' justification." Leighann Lassiter, animal cruelty policy director for the Humane Society of the United States, notes, however, the Lawrence ruling may create complications in several states that include human sexual conduct and bestiality in the same "anti-sodomy" statute. As of 2018, 45 states have direct prohibitions on bestiality, while others may prohibit it under broader animal cruelty laws, according to the Animal Legal and Historical Center (Michigan State University College of Law).

==== Prostitution ====
In 2015, the Erotic Service Provider Legal Education & Research Project (ESPLERP) filed a lawsuit against George Gascón, District Attorney for San Francisco, alleging that the state of California's anti-prostitution laws prevented relations between consenting adults in violation of Lawrence. The District Court dismissed the lawsuit and the Ninth Circuit affirmed the dismissal, reasoning that "the commercial nature of the relationship between prostitute and client suggests a far less selective relationship than that which previously has been held to constitute an intimate association."

=== Same-sex marriage bans ===
A few months later, on November 18, 2003, the Massachusetts Supreme Judicial Court ruled that same-sex couples have a right to marry. Although deciding the case on the basis of the state constitution, Chief Justice Margaret Marshall quoted Lawrence in its second paragraph: "Our obligation is to define the liberty of all, not to mandate our own moral code."

Aside from Massachusetts, other state case law had been quite explicit in limiting the scope of Lawrence and upholding state bans on same-sex marriage regulations. (See Standhardt v. Superior Court ex rel County of Maricopa, 77 P.3d 451 (Ariz. App. 2003); Morrison v. Sadler, 821 N.E.2d 15 (Ind. App. 2005); Hernandez v. Robles (7 NY3d 338 2005).)

In the first successful federal court challenge to a state same-sex marriage ban, Judge Vaughn Walker cited Scalia's dissent in his decision in Perry v. Schwarzenegger that found California's Proposition 8 banning same-sex marriage unconstitutional.

=== Same-sex adoptive parents ===
In the majority decision, Justice Kennedy wrote: "The present case does not involve minors. It does not involve persons who might be injured or coerced or who are situated in relationships where consent might not easily be refused." The "obvious" meaning, as Nancy D. Polikoff wrote, was to point out that Lawrence could not be used to legalize "sex with children". Nonetheless, in 2004, the 11th Circuit Court of Appeals quoted this sentence when saying that Lawrence had not established a right for gay parents to adopt. In an adoption case, the 11th Circuit said, "the involved actors are not only consenting adults, but minors as well ... Hence, we conclude that the Lawrence decision cannot be extrapolated to create a right to adopt for homosexual persons."

=== United States military ===
The United States Court of Appeals for the Armed Forces, the last court of appeals for courts-martial before the Supreme Court, ruled that Lawrence applies to Article 125 of the Uniform Code of Military Justice, the article banning sodomy. Nevertheless, it twice upheld prosecutions under that article when applied as necessary to preserve good order and discipline in the armed forces. Article 125 was repealed by the National Defense Authorization Act for Fiscal Year 2014.

=== Dobbs v. Jackson Women's Health Organization ===
On June 24, 2022, the Supreme Court overturned Roe v. Wade (1973) in Dobbs v. Jackson Women's Health Organization and removed the federal protection of the right to abortion, on the grounds that the "right to privacy" does not extend to that of abortion on the criteria from Washington v. Glucksberg that a right must be "deeply rooted in the Nation's history", and abortion was considered a crime, a view that some historians argued is incomplete. In the majority opinion, Justice Samuel Alito responded to the dissent opinion's concerns, saying that the ruling would not affect other substantive due process cases. In his concurring opinion, Justice Clarence Thomas, wrote, "In future cases, we should reconsider all of this Court's substantive due process precedents, including Griswold, Lawrence, and Obergefell. Because any substantive due process decision is 'demonstrably erroneous' ... we have a duty to 'correct the error' established in those precedents." The three cases Thomas mentioned concerned contraception (Griswold), sodomy (Lawrence), and same-sex marriage (Obergefell), respectively. The joint dissenting opinion of Justices Stephen Breyer, Sonia Sotomayor, and Elena Kagan, which criticized the majority for rejecting stare decisis and overruling precedents dating back to Griswold, responded, "Either the majority does not really believe in its own reasoning. Or if it does, all rights that have no history stretching back to the mid-19th century are insecure. Either the mass of the majority's opinion is hypocrisy, or additional constitutional rights are under threat. It is one or the other."

== Level of scrutiny applied in Lawrence ==
Justice Scalia and others have noted that the majority did not appear to apply the strict scrutiny standard of review that would be appropriate if the Lawrence majority had recognized a full-fledged "fundamental right". He wrote the majority instead applied "an unheard-of form of rational basis review that will have far-reaching implications beyond this case".

Nan D. Hunter has argued that Lawrence used a new method of substantive due process analysis, and that the Court intended to abandon its old method of categorizing due process rights as either "fundamental" or "not fundamental" as too restrictive. Justice Souter, for example, argued in Washington v. Glucksberg that the role of the Court in all cases, including unenumerated rights cases, is to ensure that the government's action has not been arbitrary. Justice Stevens had repeatedly criticized tiered scrutiny and preferred a more active judicial balancing test based on reasonability.

Lower courts have read Lawrence differently on the question of scrutiny. In Lofton v. Secretary of the Department of Children and Family Services, the United States Court of Appeals for the Eleventh Circuit upheld a state law barring adoption of children by homosexuals, holding explicitly that Lawrence did not apply strict scrutiny. In Witt v. Department of the Air Force, the United States Court of Appeals for the Ninth Circuit held that Lawrence applied intermediate scrutiny.

== Plaintiffs ==
In 2000, Robert Eubanks was beaten to death in a case that was never solved. Tyron Garner died of meningitis in 2006, aged 39. John Lawrence died of complications from a heart ailment in 2011, aged 68.

== See also ==
- Obergefell v. Hodges
- Sodomy laws in the United States
- LGBT rights in the United States
- List of sex-related court cases in the United States
- List of LGBTQ-related cases in the United States Supreme Court
- 2003 in LGBT rights
- Dobbs v. Jackson
- Baker v. Wade

== Notes and references ==
=== Works cited ===
- Carpenter, Dale (2012). Flagrant Conduct: The Story of Lawrence v. Texas. New York: W. W. Norton & Company. pp. 11–12. ISBN 978-0-393-06208-3. OCLC 761383909.
- Chemerinsky, Erwin (2015). Constitutional Law: Principles and Policies (5th ed.). New York: Wolters Kluwer. ISBN 978-1-4548-4947-6.
- Nowak, John E.; Rotunda, Ronald D. (2012). Treatise on Constitutional Law: Substance and Procedure (5th ed.). Eagan, Minnesota: West Thomson/Reuters. OCLC 798148265.
