= Naval Support Activity Bahrain =

American naval base in Bahrain

- Bahrain
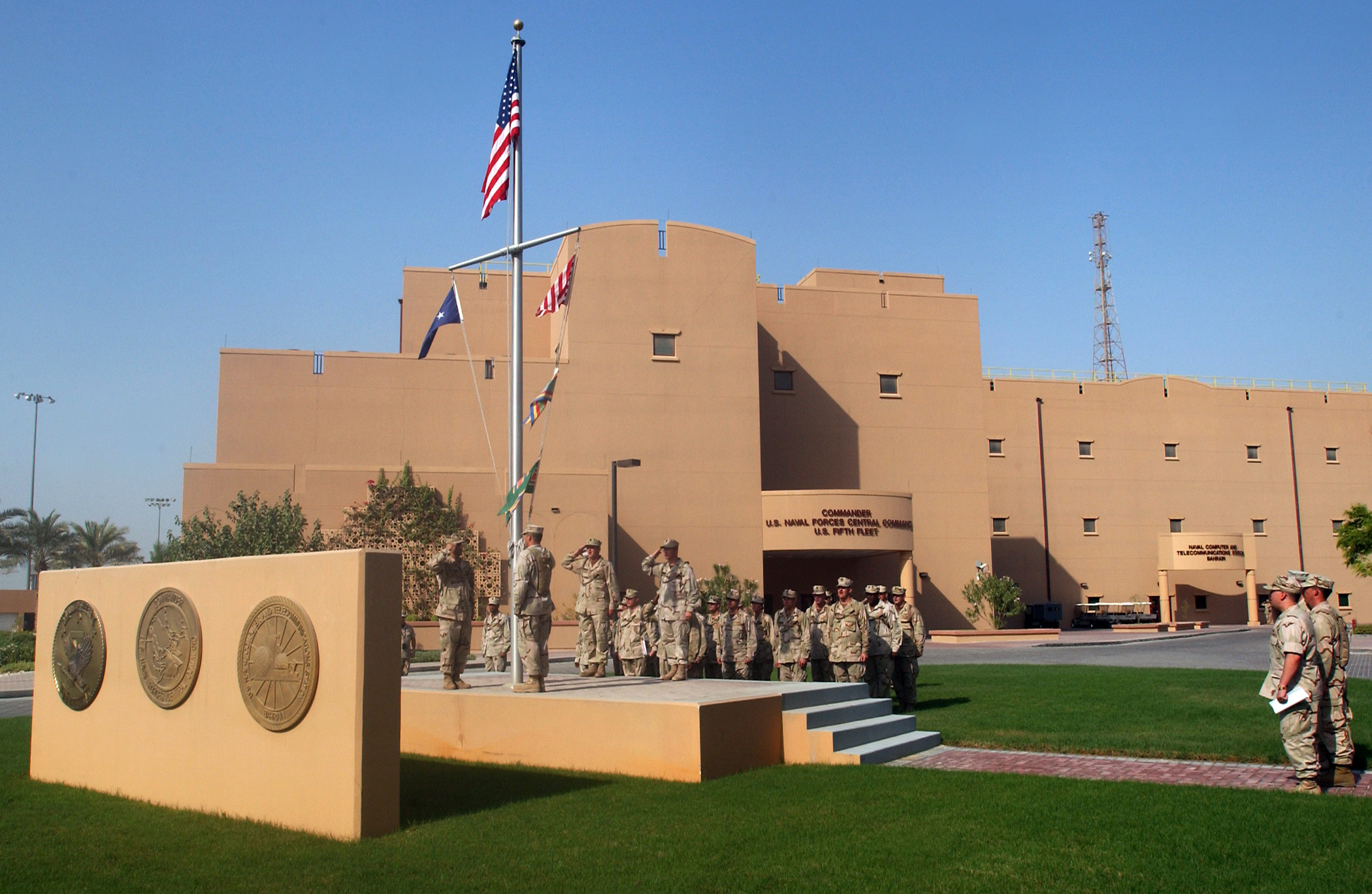
- United States Navy personnel performing morning colors at Naval Support Activity Bahrain in 2005

Site information
- Type: United States Navy Main Operating Base
- Owner: United States Government
- Controlled by: United States Navy
- Website: navymwrbahrain.com

Location
- Coordinates: 26°12′35″N 50°36′35″E

Site history
- Built: Refurbished in 1997; major renovations in 2003, 2006, and 2010–2015
- In use: 1971–present
- Battles/wars: 2026 Iran war

Garrison information
- Current commander: Captain Zachariah D. Aperauch
- Garrison: U.S. Fifth Fleet, Patrol Forces Southwest Asia

Naval Support Activity Bahrain (or NSA Bahrain) is a United States Navy base situated in the Kingdom of Bahrain. Home to U.S. Naval Forces Central Command and United States Fifth Fleet.

Occupying the original territory of the British Royal Navy base known as HMS Jufair, U.S. Navy presence was established on-site during World War II. Transferred to the U.S. government in 1971, NSA Bahrain provides support through logistical, supply, and protection as well as a Navy Exchange facility and Morale, Welfare and Recreation programs to United States Armed Forces and coalition assets.

The commander of Navy Region Europe, Africa, Southwest Asia is responsible for NSA Bahrain and Camp Lemonnier in Djibouti. Navy Region Europe, Africa, Southwest Asia is responsible to Navy Installations Command, though it has close coordination with Naval Forces Central Command.

The NSA Bahrain base was crucial for the US Fifth Fleet and NAVCENT. Located near Manama, it supported naval operations and personnel in the Middle East, especially during the 2003 Iraq invasion. During the 2026 Iran war, the base suffered heavy damage and was rendered inoperable.

== History ==
The first presence of the British Royal Navy in the Persian Gulf came about from the need to control pirates raiding British shipping east of Suez, especially the East India Company routes to India, when it appointed the first Senior Naval Officer, Persian Gulf. In the early 1820s the rulers of Bahrain, Salman and Abdullah Al Khalifa, signed an agreement to try to limit piracy in the area.

This was strengthened in 1835 through an agreement signed specifically with the Royal Navy, which addressed the need to stop pirates operating in the area and limit the slave trade. In 1932, the Bahrain Petroleum Company discovered the first oil field in the Persian Gulf outside of Iran. Commercial extraction began in 1934.

=== HMS Juffair ===
After the death of Sheikh Isa in 1932, having handed control of the state in 1921 under British diplomatic pressure to his son Hamad, his advisor Charles Belgrave with whom he had modernized the state systems and key infrastructure, suggested that they should come to an agreement with the British to open a permanent Royal Navy base within the state. HMS Juffair opened on 13 April 1935, as part of the port at Mina Salman. It was bombed by the Italian Air Force during World War II, as part of an effort to cut off one of the three Allied Forces sources of oil in the Persian Gulf.

== US Navy establishment ==
As a result of the raid, and the United States' entry into World War II beginning December 1941, the Royal Navy extended an invitation to the US Navy, allowing the USN to deploy a small detachment. Post-WW2, the posting was recognized as the U.S. Middle East Force from 1948, a small shore facility that provided logistical and communications support to Marine expeditionary vessels.

In 1971, with Bahrain gaining independence from the British Empire, the permanent Royal Navy presence in Bahrain officially ended. With the agreement of the Emir, the USN immediately took on the entire 10 acres (40,000 m^{2}) site. In 1979, the location was named Administrative Support Unit (ASU) Bahrain. In 1992, the organization was renamed ASU Southwest Asia, in an effort to more accurately reflect the increasing role of United States Navy activities in the region.

=== 1996 to 2025 ===
In 1997, under the aegis of the Military Construction Program, facilities in Juffair were built up, resulting in what is known today as Naval Support Activity Bahrain. In 2003, facilities at NSA Bahrain began expanding after Operation Iraqi Freedom began. In 2006, a large food court, known as the "Freedom Souq" and an expanded Navy Exchange opened, expanding morale and welfare support to service members and tenant commands.

In 2010, the Navy embarked on a five-year, $580-million project to expand the base, proposing to essentially double the size of the 62-acre facility. The first phase of construction included a new perimeter wall and security gate and several new utility buildings. The second phase expanded the port operations with a new harbor patrol facility and a small-craft basin. New barracks, a dining facility, a renovated recreation center and administrative buildings were constructed. The final phase included a flyover bridge connecting NSA Bahrain to the port facility at Mina Salman.

It was the primary base in the region for the naval and marine activities in support of Operation Enduring Freedom and Operation Iraqi Freedom, including when it became Operation New Dawn until the end of the Iraq War.

In 2021, NSA Bahrain earned the DOD Installation Excellence Award as one of five recipients of the 2021 Commander in Chief’s Annual Award for Installation Excellence, which recognizes the people who operate and maintain U.S. military installations.

== 2026 Iranian strikes ==
Prior to the attacks, staffing was reduced to "mission critical" levels, dropping the on-base population drastically to less than 100 personnel. Thousands of troops and their families swiftly left. They left behind belongings with many moving into temporary housing.

On February 28, 2026, NSA Bahrain was attacked by Iran during ongoing Israeli–United States strikes on Iran. The base sustained damage to a radar facility. The attack on Bahrain was part of a broader counterattack in which Iran targeted multiple US military bases in the Persian Gulf Region. No American casualties were reported from the attack. After the initial strikes, United States Naval Forces Central Command concluded that the surrounding neighborhood of Juffair was no longer safe for American personnel. As a result, the United States embassy in Manama issued shelter-in-place orders to all American personnel remaining in Bahrain. Among the hits were the command headquarters, "at least a dozen other buildings" and two satellite communications terminals.`

In August 2026, The New York Times reported that the Iranian strikes in February 2026 had destroyed much of the base, making it ineffective as a US Navy major logistics hub. This caused Naval Support Facility Diego Garcia to be chosen as the alternative logistics hub, though about 2,200 miles (1,900 nmi) from where aircraft carrier strike groups operated in the Gulf of Oman. Logistical issues created problems for the USS Abraham Lincoln, as well as with personnel, before the ship left the Persian Gulf. Iran welcomed the USA's admission of the damage it had caused.

== See also ==
- United States Navy submarine bases
- United States Navy dog handler hazing scandal
