= Able v. United States =

American legal case

- Court: United States Court of Appeals for the Second Circuit
- Full case name: Lieutenant Colonel Jane Able, et al. v. United States of America, et al.
- Argued: April 2, 1998
- Decided: September 23, 1998
- Citation: 155 F.3d 628

Case history
- Prior history: Preliminary injunction granted, 847 F. Supp. 1038 (E.D.N.Y. 1994); motion to dismiss denied, 863 F. Supp. 112 (E.D.N.Y. 1994); motion to certify interlocutory appeal denied, 870 F. Supp. 468 (E.D.N.Y. 1994); remanded, 44 F.3d 128 (2d Cir. 1995); permanent injunction entered following bench trial, 880 F. Supp. 968 (E.D.N.Y. 1995); reversed and remanded, 88 F.3d 1280 (2nd Cir. 1996); permanent injunction entered, 968 F. Supp. 850 (E.D.N.Y. 1997).

Court membership
- Judges sitting: Wilfred Feinberg, John M. Walker Jr., Pierre N. Leval

Case opinions
- Majority: Walker, joined by unanimous

Able v. United States, 88 F.3d 1280 (2nd Cir. 1996) ("Able I"), 155 F.3d 628 (2nd Cir. 1998) ("Able II"), is a case from the United States Court of Appeals for the Second Circuit that upheld the Don't ask, don't tell (10 USC 654) law against various constitutional challenges. Both Able I and Able II overruled district court decisions striking down "Don't ask, don't tell" as unconstitutional.

== Case history ==
Six gay or lesbian members of the armed forces- Lieutenant Colonel Jane Able, Petty Officer Robert Heigl, First Lieutenant Kenneth Osborn, Sergeant Steven Spencer, Lieutenant Richard Von Wohld, and Seaman Werner Zehr- had filed suit in the Eastern District of New York challenging the constitutionality of the "Don't ask, don't tell" policy. The case was assigned to U.S. District Court Judge Eugene Nickerson. When the Defense Department initiated an investigation into Petty Officer Heigl to determine if he was a homosexual, the district court issued a preliminary injunction against the investigation of him and the other plaintiffs. The Second Circuit, while determining "that the district court had applied the wrong standard in deciding to issue the preliminary injunctions", stayed the lifting of the injunction pending a merits trial.

The district court dismissed the plaintiffs' challenges to Section 654 (b) (1) and (3), as well as their expressive association challenge, on the basis that they lacked standing. The court then, following a trial, held that section 654 (b) (2) violated the First and Fifth Amendments to the United States Constitution, thus becoming the first court to do so.

On appeal, the Second Circuit vacated the 1995 ruling. They ruled that plaintiffs had standing to challenge the Section 654 (b) (1) and (3), as well as their expressive association challenge. They also vacated and remanded to the district court the First and Fifth Amendment rulings, on the basis that the "new policy strikes a reasonable balance between the competing interests and because the policy is important to the military's accomplishment of its objectives, we find that it restrains speech no more than is reasonably necessary" and "the ...assumption ...that the ban on homosexual acts found in § 654(b)(1) is valid under the Constitution."

On remand, Judge Nickerson struck down the acts provision of "Don't ask, don't tell" (Section 654(b)(1)) as a violation of the equal protection component of the Fifth Amendment. On appeal from that decision, the Second Circuit reversed, on the basis that "[g]iven the strong presumption of validity [the Court] give[s] to classifications under rational basis review and the special respect accorded to Congress's decisions regarding military matters, [they] will not substitute [their] judgment for that of Congress" and "that Congress has proffered adequate justifications for the Act". As the plaintiff-appellees asserted at oral argument "that they were not seeking any more onerous standard than the rational basis test", the Court applied rational basis review without deciding whether that was the appropriate standard for review.

== See also ==
- Sexual orientation and military service
- Sexual orientation and gender identity in the United States military
  - Sexual orientation in the United States military
