= Bowers v. Hardwick =

Overruled U.S. Supreme Court case upholding anti-sodomy laws

- Supreme Court of the United States

Argued March 31, 1986 Decided June 30, 1986
- Full case name: Michael J. Bowers, Attorney General of Georgia v. Michael Hardwick, et al.
- Citations: 478 U.S. 186 (more) 106 S. Ct. 2841; 92 L. Ed. 2d 140; 1986 U.S. LEXIS 123; 54 U.S.L.W. 4919
- Argument: Oral argument

Case history
- Prior: Dismissed, D. Ga.; reversed and remanded, 760 F.2d 1202 (11th Cir. 1985); rehearing en banc denied, 765 F.2d 1123 (11th Cir. 1985); cert. granted, 474 U.S. 943 (1985)
- Subsequent: Vacated and remanded, 804 F.2d 622 (11th Cir. 1986)

Holding
- A Georgia law classifying homosexual sex as illegal sodomy was valid because there was no constitutionally protected right to engage in homosexual sex. Eleventh Circuit reversed.

Court membership
- Chief Justice Warren E. Burger Associate Justices William J. Brennan Jr. · Byron White; Thurgood Marshall · Harry Blackmun; Lewis F. Powell Jr. · William Rehnquist; John P. Stevens · Sandra Day O'Connor

Case opinions
- Majority: White, joined by Burger, Powell, Rehnquist, O'Connor
- Concurrence: Burger
- Concurrence: Powell
- Dissent: Blackmun, joined by Brennan, Marshall, Stevens
- Dissent: Stevens, joined by Brennan, Marshall

Laws applied
- U.S. Const. amend. XIV; Ga. Code § 16-6-2 (1984)
- Overruled by
- Lawrence v. Texas, 539 U.S. 558 (2003)

Bowers v. Hardwick, 478 U.S. 186 (1986), was a landmark decision of the U.S. Supreme Court that upheld, in a 5–4 ruling, the constitutionality of a Georgia sodomy law criminalizing oral and anal sex in private between consenting adults, in this case with respect to homosexual sodomy, though the law did not differentiate between homosexual and heterosexual sodomy. It was overturned in Lawrence v. Texas (2003), though the statute had already been struck down by the Georgia Supreme Court in 1998.

The majority opinion, by Justice Byron White, reasoned that the U.S. Constitution did not confer "a fundamental right to engage in homosexual sodomy". A concurring opinion by Chief Justice Warren E. Burger cited the "ancient roots" of prohibitions against homosexual sex, quoting William Blackstone's description of homosexual sex as an "infamous crime against nature", worse than rape, and "a crime not fit to be named". Burger concluded: "To hold that the act of homosexual sodomy is somehow protected as a fundamental right would be to cast aside millennia of moral teaching." The senior dissent, by Justice Harry Blackmun, framed the issue as revolving around the right to privacy. Blackmun's dissent accused the Court of an "almost obsessive focus on homosexual activity" and an "overall refusal to consider the broad principles that have informed our treatment of privacy in specific cases."

Scholarly examinations of the case overwhelmingly sided with the dissenting minority. Some of the justices, including Lewis F. Powell, later said that they should not have joined the majority, although Powell also indicated in 1990 that the decision was of little importance. Seventeen years after Bowers, the Supreme Court directly overruled its decision in Lawrence v. Texas, holding that anti-sodomy laws are unconstitutional. In Lawrence, the Supreme Court subsequently based its decision on the American tradition of non-interference with private sexual decisions between consenting adults and on the notions of personal autonomy to define one's own relationships.

== Background ==
In early July 1982, Atlanta Police Department officer Keith Torick issued Michael Hardwick a citation for public drinking after witnessing Hardwick throw a beer bottle into a trash can outside the gay bar where he worked, allegedly observing him violating the city's ordinance that prohibits drinking in public. Due to a clerical error on the citation issued by Torick, Hardwick missed his court date and Torick obtained a warrant for Hardwick's arrest. Hardwick then settled the matter by paying a $50 fine at a court office, but Torick showed up at Hardwick's house three weeks later, on August 3, to serve the now-invalid warrant. At the time, an unrelated guest of Hardwick was sleeping on the couch in Hardwick's living room; at around 8:30 am, Officer Torick entered the house (the front door may have been ajar) and awoke the guest, then proceeded down a hallway towards Hardwick's bedroom. The officer opened the bedroom door, and Torick observed Hardwick and a companion engaged in mutual, consensual oral sex.

Hardwick was angry at the intrusion and threatened to have Torick fired for entering his home. Torick later stated that he "would never have made the case if [Hardwick] hadn't had an attitude problem." Torick then arrested both men for sodomy, a felony under Georgia law that carried a sentence of one to twenty years' imprisonment. District Attorney Lewis Slaton chose not to prosecute the sodomy charge, considering that the warrant had expired, and his own belief that the sodomy law should not be used to prosecute consensual sexual activity.

Hardwick then sued Michael Bowers, the attorney general of Georgia, in federal court for a declaratory judgment that the state's sodomy law was invalid. He charged that as a non-celibate gay man, he was liable to eventually be prosecuted for his activities. The American Civil Liberties Union (ACLU) had been searching for a "perfect test case" to challenge anti-sodomy laws, and Hardwick's cause presented the one they were looking for. They approached Hardwick, who agreed to be represented by ACLU attorneys.

In the lower federal courts, Hardwick was represented by attorney Kathleen Wilde. The case was filed in the United States District Court for the Northern District of Georgia, where it was dismissed, with the Court ruling in favor of Bowers. Hardwick appealed, and the United States Court of Appeals for the Eleventh Circuit reversed the lower court, finding that the Georgia sodomy statute was an infringement upon Hardwick's constitutional rights. The State of Georgia then appealed, and the Supreme Court of the United States granted certiorari on November 4, 1985, to review the case.

Hardwick was represented before the Supreme Court by Harvard Law School Professor Laurence Tribe. Michael Hobbs, assistant attorney general, argued the case for the state. The legality of the officer's entry into Hardwick's home was not contested; only the constitutionality of the sodomy statute was challenged.

A heterosexual married couple was initially named in the suit as plaintiffs John and Mary Doe, alleging that they wished to engage in sodomy but were prevented from doing so by the Georgia anti-sodomy law. They failed to obtain standing and were dropped from the suit.

== Opinion of the Court ==
The Court issued a 5–4 ruling upholding the sodomy laws. Justice Byron White wrote the majority opinion and was joined by Justices William Rehnquist, Sandra Day O'Connor, Warren E. Burger, and Lewis F. Powell. Justice Harry Blackmun wrote a dissent joined by William J. Brennan, Jr., Thurgood Marshall, and John Paul Stevens. Stevens also wrote a dissent joined by Brennan and Marshall.

=== Majority opinion ===
The issue in Bowers involved the right of privacy. Since 1965's Griswold v. Connecticut, the Court had held that a right to privacy was implicit in the Due Process Clause of the Fourteenth Amendment to the United States Constitution. In Bowers, the Court held that this right did not extend to private, consensual sexual conduct, at least insofar as it involved homosexual sex. The majority opinion in Bowers, written by Justice Byron White, framed the legal question as to whether the Constitution confers "a fundamental right upon homosexuals to engage in sodomy." The opinion answered this question in the negative, stating that "to claim that a right to engage in such conduct is 'deeply rooted in this Nation's history and tradition' or 'implicit in the concept of ordered liberty' is, at best, facetious."

Justice White added a slippery slope warning about undesirable potential implications for other sex laws:

And if respondent's submission is limited to the voluntary sexual conduct between consenting adults, it would be difficult, except by fiat, to limit the claimed right to homosexual conduct [478 U.S. 186, 196] while leaving exposed to prosecution adultery, incest, and other sexual crimes even though they are committed in the home. We are unwilling to start down that road.

=== Chief Justice Burger's concurrence ===
The short concurring opinion by Chief Justice Warren E. Burger emphasized historical negative attitudes toward homosexual sex, quoting Sir William Blackstone's characterization of sodomy as "a crime not fit to be named" and an offense of "deeper malignity" than rape. Burger concluded, "To hold that the act of homosexual sodomy is somehow protected as a fundamental right would be to cast aside millennia of moral teaching."

=== Justice Powell's concurrence ===
In a concurring opinion, Justice Lewis F. Powell, Jr. joined the majority opinion in upholding the law against a substantive due process attack. He voiced doubts about the compatibility of Georgia's law with the Eighth Amendment to the U.S. Constitution, noting that even consensual sodomy could be punished with up to twenty years in prison, the same sentence as an aggravated battery or first-degree arson. Since Hardwick had not been tried or sentenced, the question of the statute's constitutionality under the Eighth Amendment did not come up in the case.

Powell was considered the deciding vote during the case. He had initially voted to strike down the law but changed his mind after conservative clerk Michael W. Mosman advised him to uphold the ban, and after Chief Justice Burger had implored him to change his vote. It has been claimed that Powell's decision to uphold the law was influenced by his belief that he had never known any homosexuals, even though one of his own law clerks was gay. That clerk said Powell had met his boyfriend and asked him about the mechanisms of homosexual sex when deciding the case. He felt that Powell had made the remark in order to avoid revealing that one of his clerks was gay at a time when such a revelation could have destroyed that clerk's future legal career. Journalists have since found that Powell hired more gay law clerks than any of the other justices.

=== Dissents ===
==== Justice Blackmun's dissent ====
A sharply worded dissenting opinion by Justice Harry Blackmun attacked the majority opinion as having an "almost obsessive focus on homosexual activity". Blackmun wrote, "Only the most willful blindness could obscure the fact that sexual intimacy is 'a sensitive, key relationship of human existence, central to family life, community welfare, and the development of human personality'", quoting from Burger's opinion in Paris Adult Theatre I v. Slaton, which held that obscene films are not constitutionally protected. The dissent compared the majority opinion to that in Minersville School District v. Gobitis, which was reversed by the Court after only three years. At the conclusion of his opinion, Blackmun wrote simply "I dissent," rather than the customary "I respectfully dissent."

Blackmun revealed in a 1995 oral history with Harold Koh that his dissent in Bowers v. Hardwick was written primarily by Blackmun's openly gay clerk Pamela S. Karlan. Blackmun said of the dissent, "Karlan did a lot of very effective writing, and I owe a lot to her and her ability in getting that dissent out. She felt very strongly about it, and I think is correct in her approach to it. I think the dissent is correct."

==== Justice Stevens's dissent ====
Justice John Paul Stevens wrote a separate dissent that focused on the selective enforcement of the law against homosexuals. The Georgia statute could not be applied to married heterosexuals, as consensual sexual activity within the bounds of marriage was protected under Griswold v. Connecticut, nor could the law be applied to unmarried heterosexuals, as Eisenstadt v. Baird had extended Griswold to unmarried people. Since heterosexuals could never be prosecuted for sodomy, Georgia should have the burden of proving that selective enforcement against homosexuals was constitutional.

==== Subsequent findings ====
According to Daniel Richman, former law clerk for Justice Thurgood Marshall, Marshall's friendship with civil rights leader Bayard Rustin and Rustin's openness about his homosexuality played a significant role in Marshall's decision to join both dissents. Richman also recalled that Marshall thought that the case was a "no-brainer", and told Richman, who wrote a bench memo for Marshall on the case, that "this [case] is controlled by Stanley".

Warren Burger's views on homosexuality have come under scrutiny. He attempted to convince Byron White to include overtly homophobic language in the majority, which White refused to do. Burger lobbied Powell to change his mind, and sent him a note comparing homosexuals to Jack the Ripper.

== Subsequent events ==
=== Michael Hardwick ===
Hardwick had returned to south Florida before the case was argued on March 31, 1986. He granted interviews about the case and appeared on Donahue in the aftermath. He also attended the 1987 March on Washington, which had been inspired in part by the decision in his case. Hardwick was arrested with about 600 other protestors at the Supreme Court building on October 13, 1987, in an action intended to draw attention to the decision.

Hardwick had a career as a visual artist and designed the interiors of Miami Beach's Club Nu and Fort Lauderdale's Squeeze. He died on June 13, 1991, of complications from AIDS. According to his lawyer Kathleen Wilde, he died very bitter about the outcome of the case.

=== Jurisprudence ===
Bowers was decided at a time when the court's privacy jurisprudence, and in particular the right to abortion recognized in Roe v. Wade, had come under heavy criticism. Bowers signaled a reluctance by the Court to recognize a general constitutional right to privacy or to extend such a right further than they already had.

The Georgia law upheld in Bowers criminalized oral sex and anal sex whether engaged in by people of the same sex or different sexes, but White's decision was restricted to homosexual sex. "The only claim properly before the Court, therefore, is Hardwick's challenge to the Georgia statute as applied to consensual homosexual sodomy. We express no opinion on the constitutionality of the Georgia statute as applied to other acts of sodomy." State sodomy laws were seldom enforced against private, consensual conduct in the decades following the decision, though many courts and state governments interpreted it to justify a wide variety of bans and limitations on the lives of gay people.

Bowers was used to deny suspect class qualification to gays and lesbians, thus restricting the standard of review to rational basis. Although Bowers was later overruled, decisions based on it, such as High Tech Gays v. Defense Industrial Security Clearance Office, are sometimes still cited as precedent in gay rights cases.

=== Justice Powell's later comments ===
In 1990, three years after retiring from the Court, Powell told a group of New York University law students that he considered his opinion in Bowers an error, saying, "I do think it was inconsistent in a general way with Roe. When I had the opportunity to reread the opinions a few months later I thought the dissent had the better of the arguments." Powell believed the case was one of little importance, and in 1990 said he had not devoted thirty minutes to think about it since the ruling.

=== Repeal of state sodomy laws ===
In the years after Bowers was decided, several state legislatures repealed their sodomy laws. In addition, a number of state courts invalidated sodomy laws under privacy or other provisions of their state constitutions. In 1998, the same sodomy law that was upheld in Bowers was struck down by the Georgia Supreme Court in the case of Powell v. State.

==== Lawrence v. Texas ====
In 2003, the remaining sodomy laws in 13 states were invalidated, insofar as they applied to private consensual conduct among adults, by the Supreme Court decision in Lawrence v. Texas, which explicitly overturned Bowers. In Lawrence, the Supreme Court subsequently based its decision on the American tradition of non-interference with private sexual decisions between consenting adults and on the notions of personal autonomy to define one's own relationships. Justice Anthony Kennedy wrote the majority opinion in Lawrence, ruling that Texas's state sodomy law was unconstitutional under the Fourteenth Amendment's due process clause (adult consensual sexual intimacy in one's home is a vital interest in liberty and privacy protected by the Due Process Clause). Kennedy wrote: "Bowers was not correct when it was decided, and it is not correct today. It ought not to remain binding precedent. Bowers v. Hardwick should be and now is overruled."

=== Media portrayal ===
Bill Moyers discussed the decision at length in an interview with Blackmun on the episode "Mr. Justice Blackmun" of the 1987 Constitutional bicentennial documentary miniseries In Search of the Constitution, and with Hardwick personally in a further episode "For the People".

In 2009 a play based on the life of Michael Hardwick and the judicial proceedings, Sodomy Rules: The Bowers v. Hardwick Trial, was written and performed by Bill Crouch in New York City.

In 2019, an updated revision of Sodomy Rules! (The Bowers v. Hardwick Trial), a solo documentary play based on the life of Michael Hardwick, was written and performed by Bill Crouch in New York City at The New Work Series presented by Emerging Artists on October 7, 2019.

=== In popular culture ===
The last name of the satirical character Betty Bowers, played by Deven Green, is taken from this case.

In the movie The Pelican Brief, there is a scene of a classroom in Tulane University in which the instructor and students discuss this case, with Julia Roberts' character, Darby Shaw, saying that the Court's decision was wrong.

== See also ==
- Dudgeon v United Kingdom
- Judicial review
- Baker v. Nelson
- List of court cases
- List of United States Supreme Court cases, volume 478
- List of United States Supreme Court cases
- Lists of United States Supreme Court cases by volume
- List of United States Supreme Court cases by the Rehnquist Court
- List of LGBT-related cases in the United States Supreme Court
- Sex-related court cases
- Sodomy laws in the United States

== Bibliography ==
- Douglas-Brown, Laura (July 12, 2001). "Bowers v. Hardwick at 15". Southern Voice. Archived from the original on August 20, 2010.
- Murdoch, Joyce; Price, Deb (2001). Courting Justice: Gay Men and Lesbians v. the Supreme Court. Basic Books. ISBN 978-0-465-01514-6.
- Shilts, Randy (1993). Conduct Unbecoming: Gays and Lesbians in the U.S. Military. St. Martin's Griffin. ISBN 978-0-312-34264-7.
