= Fulton County District Attorney (Georgia) =

Elected district attorney for Fulton County

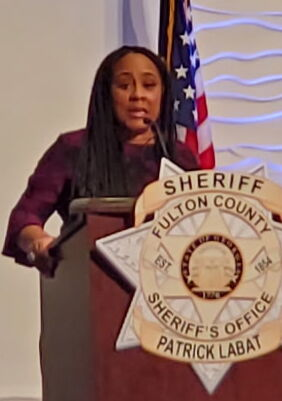
- Incumbent; Fani Willis since January 1, 2021
- Fulton County District Attorney's Office
- Type: District attorney
- Status: Elected constitutional officer
- Seat: Atlanta, Georgia
- Appointer: Popular election
- Term length: Four years
- Constituting instrument: Constitution of Georgia
- Precursor: Fulton County Solicitor General
- Inaugural holder: Lewis R. Slaton Jr.
- Formation: 1968
- Website: fultoncountyga.gov/districtattorney

The Fulton County District Attorney is the elected district attorney for the Atlanta Judicial District, encompassing Fulton County, Georgia, as part of the Judiciary of Georgia.

== History ==
The office was known as the Fulton County Solicitor General's Office until 1968, when a state constitutional amendment renamed all solicitors general who represent the state government in court cases as district attorneys. The modern Fulton County Solicitor General represents the county in court cases and exists as an elected office of the county government, separate from the Atlanta Judicial Circuit.

Prior to a 1966 constitutional amendment, all solicitors general were elected statewide, regardless of circuit of residency.

== List of Fulton County District Attorneys ==
District attorney	Tenure	Notable cases	Notes
Charles D. Hill	–1907		
N. J. Norman	1907–1909		
Charles D. Hill	1909–1910		died in office
Hugh Dorsey	1910–1916	Murder trial of Leo Frank	resigned to run successfully for Governor
John A. Boykin	1917–1945	Atlanta graft ring	
E. E. Andrews	1945–1949		
Paul Webb	1949–1962		
William T. Boyd	1962–1965		died in office
Lewis R. Slaton Jr	1965–1996	Atlanta murders of 1979–1981	
Paul Howard Jr.	1997–2021	Atlanta Public Schools cheating scandal	
Fani Willis	2021–present	Georgia election racketeering prosecution, YSL Records racketeering trial	

== Notable employees in the District Attorney's Office ==
- Leroy R. Johnson, Criminal Investigator for the office from 1957-1962, first Black employee, later first Black member of the Georgia General Assembly
- Clarence Cooper, served as assistant district attorney in 1968 and from 1970 to 1975, first Black ADA
- Will Wooten, currently serving as deputy district attorney
