= List of United States courts of appeals cases =

Notable opinions rendered by intermediate American federal courts

Every year, each of the thirteen United States courts of appeals decides hundreds of cases. Of those, a few are so important that they later become models for decisions of other circuits, and of the United States Supreme Court, while others are noted for being dramatically rejected by the Supreme Court on appeal. Still others are notable for being written with such a clear and concise explanation of the states of the law that they are used by multiple law school casebooks to teach the area of law addressed. The notable decisions of these courts are listed in chronological order by circuit.

== First Circuit ==
- Sampson v. Channell, 110 F.2d 754 (1st Cir. 1940): Application of Erie doctrine to choice of law questions.
- Columbia Broadcasting System, Inc. v. DeCosta, 377 F.2d 315 (1st Cir. 1967): Unfair competition laws are not an appropriate substitute for copyright regarding fictional characters. (Note: A different count of the lawsuit was later appealed separately, bringing this case to the First Circuit again. See DeCosta v. Columbia Broadcasting System, Inc., 520 F.2d 499 (1st Cir. 1975).)
- Joint Tribal Council of the Passamaquoddy Tribe v. Morton, 528 F.2d 370 (1st Cir. 1975): The state of Maine could not terminate a trust relationship between non-federally-recognized Indian tribes and the federal government.
- Mashpee Tribe v. New Seabury Corp., 592 F.2d 575 (1st Cir. 1979): Mashpee Tribe of Massachusetts was not a "tribe"; upheld first litigation under the Nonintercourse Act to go to a jury.
- United States v. Nippon Paper Industries, 109 F.3d 1 (1st Cir. 1997): The criminal penalties of the Sherman Antitrust Act have the same extraterritorial jurisdiction as the civil penalties, and can be applied to foreign companies.
- Microsystems Software, Inc. v. Scandinavia Online AB, 226 F.3d 35 (1st Cir. 2000): Dismissal of claims for reverse engineering and cryptanalysis of content-control software.
- Campbell v. General Dynamics Government Systems Corp., 407 F.3d 546 (1st Cir. 2005): Insufficient notice where a mandatory arbitration agreement was contained in a dispute resolution policy linked to an e-mailed company-wide announcement.
- Massachusetts v. United States Department of Health and Human Services, 682 F.3d 1 (1st Cir. 2006): Federal prohibition on same-sex marriage was unconstitutional.
- Cook v. Gates, 528 F.3d 42 (1st Cir. 2008): "Don't ask, Don't tell" policy upheld against due process and equal protection Fifth Amendment challenges and a free speech challenge under the First Amendment.
- Glik v. Cunniffe, 655 F.3d 78 (1st Cir. 2011): First Amendment right to photograph public officials in a public place.
- Gill v. Office of Personnel Management, 682 F.3d 1 (1st Cir. 2012): Section 3 of the Defense of Marriage Act (DOMA), which denies federal benefits to same-sex couples, violates the Equal Protection Clause. (Note: The U.S. Supreme Court struck down Section 3 of DOMA in United States v. Windsor (2013).)
- Jones v. City of Boston, 752 F.3d 38 (1st Cir. 2014): "Practical significance" is not needed in order to show disparate impact discrimination.
- Kosilek v. Spencer, 774 F.3d 63 (1st Cir. 2014): Prison did not demonstrate deliberate indifference under the Eighth Amendment by denying gender-affirming surgery to inmate with gender dysphoria, under her circumstances. (Note: See also Gibson v. Collier and Edmo v. Corizon, Inc.)
- Cangrejeros de Santurce Baseball Club, LLC v. Liga de Beisbol Profesional de Puerto Rico, Inc., 146 F.4th 1 (1st Cir. 2025): The baseball antitrust exemption applies to leagues other than Major League Baseball.

== Second Circuit ==
- Nichols v. Universal Pictures Corp., 45 F.2d 119 (2d Cir. 1930): Copyright infringement of stock characters.
- United States v. One Package of Japanese Pessaries, 86 F.2d 737 (2nd Cir. 1936): Importation of birth control supplies.
- United States v. Peoni, 100 F.2d 401 (2d Cir. 1938): Examined mental state for complicity in a crime.
- United States v. Carroll Towing Co. 159 F.2d 169 (2d. Cir. 1947): Calculus of negligence.
- National Comics Publications, Inc. v. Fawcett Publications, Inc., 191 F.2d 594 (2d Cir. 1951): Clarified 198 F.2d 927 (2d Cir. 1952).
- Scenic Hudson Preservation Conference v. Federal Power Commission, 354 F.2d 608 (2d Cir. 1965): Legal standing of a conservation group to sue to prevent environmental damage.
- Walkovszky v. Carlton, 276 2d 585 (2d Cir. 1966): Lifting the corporate veil.
- Engblom v. Carey, 677 F.2d 957 (2d Cir. 1982): Third Amendment prohibited eviction of striking prison guards from state-supplied housing in favor of national guardsmen.

== Third Circuit ==
- Corfield v. Coryell, (6 Fed. Cas. 546, no. 3,230 C.C.E.D.Pa. 1823): Privileges and immunities.
- Monsanto Co. v. Rohm and Haas Co., 456 F.2d 592 (3d Cir. 1972), failure to disclose material information to the Patent Office was fraudulent, and potentially a violation if the Sherman Antitrust Act
- Piscataway School Board v. Taxman, 91 F.3d 1547 (3d Cir. 1996): Affirmative action in public hiring.
- Kaelin v. Globe Communications, 162 F.3d 1036 (3rd Cir. 1998): Magazine cover headline which "falsely insinuated" a criminal act may be grounds for a libel action even if the related article inside the magazine is not defamatory.
- American Civil Liberties Union v. Schundler, 168 F.3d 92 (3rd Cir. 1999): Standards for a government-sponsored holiday display containing religious symbols.
- A.D. Bedell Wholesale Co., Inc. v. Philip Morris Inc., 263 F.3d 239 (3d Cir. 2001): Tobacco companies could still be found to violate the Sherman Antitrust Act based on pricing activities, despite the Tobacco Master Settlement Agreement

== Fourth Circuit ==
- Dow v. United States, 226 F. 145 (4th Cir. 1915): Syrian immigrant was entitled to be classified as "white" for purposes of naturalization as a United States citizen, which was then limited on the basis of race.
- Backun v. United States, 112 F.2d 635 (4th Cir. 1940): Examined mental element for complicity in a crime.
- United States v. Morlang, 531 F.2d 183 (4th Cir. 1975): Standard for abuse of FRE 607.
- Dettmer v. Landon, 799 F.2d 929 (4th Cir. 1986): Wicca reviewed as a religion; no First Amendment violation to deny a Wiccan access to unusual materials.
- Comprehensive Technologies International, Inc. v. Software Artisans, Inc., 3 F.3d 730 (4th Cir. 1993): Legal tests for software copyright infringement.
- Zeran v. America Online, Inc., 129 F.3d 327 (4th Cir. 1997), cert. denied, 524 U.S. 937 (1998): Liability for website hosts under the Communications Decency Act.
- Food Lion, Inc. v. Capital Cities/ABC, Inc., 194 F.3d 505 (4th Cir. 1999): PrimeTime Live journalists did not commit fraud in creating fake identities to conduct an investigation into Food Lion as employees, but did commit trespass and breach of duty of loyalty.
- Workman v. Mingo County Board of Education, 419 Fed. Appx. 348 (4th Cir. 2011): states are not constitutionally required to provide a religious exemption to mandatory vaccination for school attendance.

== Fifth Circuit ==
- Cowden v. Commissioner, 289 F.2d 20 (5th Cir. 1961): Outlining the factors used to determine whether something received is a cash equivalent, and therefore taxable.
- Dixon v. Alabama 294 F. 2d 150 (5th Cir. 1961): Tax-funded college cannot expel students without due process.
- Hawkins v. Town of Shaw, 437 F.2d 1286 (5th Cir. 1971): Equal Protection Clause applied to distribution of municipal services and infrastructure.
- Gates v. Collier, 501 F. 2d 1291 (5th Cir. 1974): Abolished racial segregation in prisons and held that various forms of corporal punishment against prisoners constitute cruel and unusual punishment in violation of the Eighth Amendment.
- Smith v. Pilots Union, 296 F.3d 380 (5th Cir. 2002): Six-month period of limitations applies to Smith's suit against the Union whether or not he was a supervisor.
- McCorvey v. Hill, 385 F.3d 846 (5th Cir. 2004): Original party to the decision in Roe v. Wade lacked standing to have the case re-opened after 30 years.
- Gibson v. Collier, 920 F.3d 2012 (5th Cir. 2019): No prisoner has a right to gender-affirming surgery under the Eighth Amendment. (Note: See also Kosilek v. Spencer and Edmo v. Corizon, Inc.)
- Horvath v. City of Leander, No. 18-51011 (5th Cir. 2020): An employer may require employees to receive vaccinations, so long as the employer makes reasonable accommodations to religious objections, even if the accommodations offered are not ideal for the employee.

== Sixth Circuit ==
- Addyston Pipe & Steel Co. v. United States, 85 F. 271 (6th Cir. 1898): Rule of reason in antitrust cases.
- Miller v. Commissioner, 733 F.2d 399 (6th Cir. 1984): Taxpayers can claim deductions for uncompensated economic detriments regardless of whether the property was insured.
- Alerding v. Ohio High School Athletic Association, 779 F.2d 315 (6th Cir. 1985): Participation in interscholastic sports is not a fundamental privilege protected by the Privileges and Immunities Clause.
- American Civil Liberties Union v. National Security Agency, 493 F.3d 644 (6th Cir. 2007): No standing to sue NSA where plaintiff ACLU could not present evidence that they were the targets of surveillance.
- United States v. Warshak, 631 F.3d 266 (6th Cir. 2010): Fourth Amendment rights bars government from compelling an Internet service provider (ISP) to turn over his emails without first obtaining a search warrant based on probable cause.
- Novak v. City of Parma, No. 21-3290 (6th Cir. 2022): Granting qualified immunity to police officers who arrested a parodist.

== Seventh Circuit ==
- Harris v. Harvey, 605 F.2d 330 (7th Cir. 1979): a judge engaging in acts of public defamation inspired by racial prejudice is not protected by judicial immunity and therefore a civil lawsuit against a judge can be brought under the Civil Rights Act (42 U.S.C. § 1983).
- Menora v. Illinois High School Association, 683 F.2d 1030 (7th Cir. 1982): Supreme Court's ruling in Sherbert v. Verner does not require public basketball league with a reasonable safety concern to allow Orthodox Jewish players to wear kippot (religious head-coverings) during play, provided that a safer alternative can be reasonably created.
- Selle v. Gibb, 741 F. 2d 896 (7th Cir. 1984): Substantial similarity is not enough to prove copyright infringement in the absence of proof of access.
- American Booksellers Ass'n, Inc. v. Hudnut, 771 F.2d 323 (7th Cir. 1985): Challenged the constitutionality of the Antipornography Civil Rights Ordinance.
- United States v. Harris, 942 F.2d 1125 (7th Cir. 1991): Gift to a long-term mistress did not constitute taxable income.
- ProCD, Inc. v. Zeidenberg, 86 F.3d 1447 (7th Cir. 1996): Validity of shrink wrap contracts.
- In re Aimster Copyright Litigation, 334 F.3d 643 (7th Cir. 2003): Vicarious liability for copyright infringement.
- Muth v. Frank, 412 F.3d 808 (7th Cir. 2005): U.S. Supreme Court's decision in Lawrence v. Texas, 539 U.S. 558 (2003): Striking down anti-homosexual sodomy laws as unconstitutional did not bar laws against consensual adult incest.

== Eighth Circuit ==
- United States v. Moore, 846 F.2d 1163 (8th Cir. 1988): Evidence was sufficient for jury to find that defendant's mouth and teeth had the capacity to be a "deadly weapon" under the assault statute; that defendant had a positive diagnosis for AIDS, but was not at risk of transmitting it by bite, was deemed secondary to the danger of bites in general.
- Frosty Treats, Inc. v. Sony Computer Entertainment America, Inc., 426 F.3d 1001 (8th Cir. 2005): Trademark and trade dress.
- United States v. $124,700 in U.S. Currency, 458 F.3d 822 (8th Cir. 2006): Transport of large amounts of currency concealed in an unusual manner could be taken as evidence that the currency was connected with drug trafficking.

== Ninth Circuit ==
- Construction Industry Association v. City of Petaluma, 522 F.2d 897 (9th Cir. 1975): The Constitution does not bar the city of Petaluma, California, from limiting urban growth by restricting how much can be built within city limits and where it can be built.
- Hirabayashi v. United States, 28 F.2d 591 (9th Cir. 1987): Vacation of World War II-era convictions of Japanese-American Gordon Hirabayashi by writ of coram nobis.
- Midler v. Ford Motor Co. 849 F.2d 460 (9th Cir. 1998): Definition of unique feature for purposes of protection from unauthorized impersonation.
- Apple Computer, Inc. v. Microsoft Corp., 35 F.3d 1435 (9th Cir. 1994): Copyright infringement with respect to the layout of a computer desktop.
- A&M Records, Inc. v. Napster, Inc., 239 F.3d 1004 (9th Cir. 2001): Vicarious liability for copyright infringement.
- Konop v. Hawaiian Airlines, Inc., 236 F.3d 1035 (9th Cir. 2001): Whether unauthorized access of password-protected website violates federal Wiretap Act prohibition on intercepting electronic communications.
- Carafano v. Metrosplash.com, Inc., 339 F.3d 1119 (9th Cir. 2003): Liability of internet forum providers.
- Grosso v. Miramax Film Corp., 383 F.3d 965 (9th Cir. 2004): Preemption of state law claims by the copyright act.
- Arizona Cartridge Remanufacturers Ass'n Inc. v. Lexmark International Inc., 421 F.3d 981 (9th Cir. 2005): Validity of certain end-user license agreements.
- Sprint PCS, L.P. v. City of La Cañada Flintridge, 435 F.3d 993 (9th Cir. 2006): Ability of a city to deny construction permit on aesthetic grounds.
- Navajo Nation v. United States Forest Service, 479 F.3d 1024 (9th Cir. 2007): Whether use of treated sewage water on lands considered sacred to the Navajo Nation violated the Religious Freedom Restoration Act.
- Asset Marketing Systems, Inc. v. Gagnon, 542 F. 3d 748 (9th Cir. 2008): Implied licenses to use, modify and retain the source code of computer programs, and the enforceability of non-competition agreements
- Joffe v. Google, Inc., 746 F.3d 920 (9th Cir. 2013): Whether the Wiretap Act covers the interception of unencrypted Wi-Fi communications.
- SmithKline Beecham Corporation v. Abbott Laboratories, 740 F.3d 471 (9th Cir. 2014): Peremptory challenges striking potential jurors because of their sexual orientation violates the equal protection clause of the U.S. Constitution.
- Edmo v. Corizon, Inc., 935 F.3d 757 (9th Cir. 2019): Prison demonstrated deliberate indifference under the Eighth Amendment by denying gender-affirming surgery to inmate with gender dysphoria, under her circumstances. (Note: See also Kosilek v. Spencer and Gibson v. Collier.)

== Tenth Circuit ==
- Moritz v. Commissioner, 469 F.2d 466 (10th Cir. 1972): Equal Protection Clause prevents the Internal Revenue Service from discriminating on the basis of sex, which they did by making a certain deduction only available to women and former married men.
- National Gay Task Force v. Board of Education, 729 F.2d 1270 (10th Cir. 1984): Due Process and Equal Protection Clauses do not prohibit Oklahoma from firing schoolteachers for engaging in "homosexual activity", but the Free Speech Clause does prohibit Oklahoma from firing teachers for advocating for it.
- Simpson v. University of Colorado, 500 F.3d 1170 (10th Cir. 2007): A university can be found liable under Title IX if their policies create a risk of sexual assault to which they are deliberately indifferent.
- Brown v. Buhman, 822 F.3d 1151 (10th Cir. 2016): Husband and his four wives did not have standing to challenge Utah's ban of bigamy because the county had a policy of only enforcing that law in connection with other crimes.
- Fitisemanu v. United States, 1 F.4th 862 (10th Cir. 2021): Citizenship Clause does not automatically apply to American Samoa.

== Eleventh Circuit ==
- Miles v. City Council of Augusta, Georgia, 710 F.2d 1542 (11th Cir. 1983): Exhibition of a "talking cat" was an occupation for the purposes of municipal licensing law.
- Smith v. Board of School Commissioners of Mobile County, 827 F.2d 684 (11th Cir. 1987): Teaching of ideas associated with secular humanism does not constitute endorsement of a religion.
- Estate of Martin Luther King, Jr., Inc. v. CBS, Inc., 194 F.3d 1211 (11th Cir. 1999): Original delivery of Martin Luther King Jr.'s "I Have a Dream" speech was legally a "performance", rather than a "general publication" of the speech, with the text still being covered by copyright.
- Suntrust Bank v. Houghton Mifflin Co., 252 F. 3d 1165 (11th Cir. 2001): Parody as a fair use defense to copyright infringement.
- Arce v. García, 434 F.3d 1254 (11th Cir. 2006): Salvadoran plaintiffs who had been tortured in their home country could sue the responsible Ecuadoran government officials under the Alien Tort Claims Act (ATCA) and the Torture Victim Protection Act (TVPA).

== D.C. Circuit ==
- Frye v. United States, 293 F. 1013 (D.C. Cir. 1923): Established that the admissibility of expert testimony must be based on scientific methods that are sufficiently established and accepted.
- Edwards v. Habib, 397 F.2d 687 (D.C. Cir. 1968): Established the tenant's defense of retaliatory eviction.
- Javins v. First National Realty Corp., 428 F.2d 1071 (D.C. Cir. 1970): Established warranty of habitability.
- Calvert Cliffs' Coordinating Committee, Inc. v. Atomic Energy Commission, 449 F.2d 1109 (D.C. Cir. 1971): National Environmental Policy Act (NEPA) requires EPA to evaluate environmental impact of nuclear power plants, even if review is not requested.
- Canterbury v. Spence, 464 F.2d. 772 (D.C. Cir. 1972): In medical malpractices cases, informed consent is required of the patient and no expert is required for the case to be heard by a jury.
- United States v. Moore, 486 F.2d 1139 (D.C. Cir. 1972): Narcotics addiction is not a defense to criminal prosecution for possession of narcotics under Robinson v. California or the common law principle of mens rea.
- Acree v. Republic of Iraq, 370 F.3d 41(D.C. Cir. 2004): Established the FSIA did not create new causes of action against foreign states.
- Pro-Football, Inc. v. Harjo, 415 F.3d 44 (D.C. Cir. 2005): Applicability of laches defense to disparagement claims.
- Colorado River Indian Tribes v. National Indian Gaming Commission, 05-5402 (D.C. Cir. 2006): National Indian Gaming Commission doesn't have oversight jurisdiction in regulating Class II or Class III games in Class III Indian casinos.
- Doe ex. rel. Tarlow v. District of Columbia, 489 F.3d 376 (D.C. Cir. 2007) : Regarding surgical treatment for the mentally incompetent who are unable to give informed consent.

== Federal Circuit (and its predecessor courts) ==
- State Street Bank & Trust Co. v. Signature Financial Group, Inc., 149 F.3d 1368 (Fed. Cir. 1998): An invention was eligible for patent protection if it involved some practical application and "produces a useful, concrete and tangible result". Later overturned by another decision.
- Jazz Photo Corp. v. United States International Trade Commission, 264 F. 3d 1094 (Fed. Cir. 2001): Repair and reconstruction of patented items is permissible under the patent law.
- Schism v. United States, 316 F.3d 1259 (Fed. Cir. 2002) (en banc): Military could not be held to promises made by recruiters of lifetime health care for enlistees, where Congress did not provide for such.
- Buchanan v. Nicholson, 451 F.3d 1331 (Fed. Cir. 2006): Competent lay evidence can be sufficient to establish a service-connection award without any contemporaneous medical evidence.
- Jandreau v. Nicholson, 492 F.3d 1372 (Fed. Cir. 2007): Similar to the previous case: competent lay evidence can be sufficient to establish a diagnosis if certain conditions are met.

=== Court of Claims ===
- Williams & Wilkins Co. v. United States, 487 F.2d 1345 (Ct. Cl. 1973), per curiam aff'd by an equally divided court, 420 U.S. 376 (1975): Liability for copyright infringement for photocopying of journal articles.

== See also ==
- List of sources of law in the United States
- Lists of United States Supreme Court cases
- List of United States state supreme court cases
