= List of United States Court of Appeals for the Tenth Circuit cases =

List of court cases

The United States Court of Appeals for the Tenth Circuit is one of the U.S.'s thirteen intermediate federal appellate courts, hearing appeals from federal cases heard in Colorado, Kansas, New Mexico, Utah, and Wyoming; the Western, Eastern, and Northern Districts of Oklahoma; and some cases in special tribunals that would have otherwise gone to one of those districts. Its opinions are binding precedent within those districts when published in the Federal Reporter.

== List of cases ==
Case name	Citation	Date decided	Lower court
Moritz v. Commissioner	469 F.2d 466	November 22, 1972	Tax Court
The Equal Protection Clause prevents the Internal Revenue Service from discriminating on the basis of sex, which they did by making a certain deduction only available to women and former married men.
Clegg v. Conk	507 F.2d 1351	December 5, 1974	District of Utah
Private damage actions under the Securities Exchange Act must show scienter or "conscious fault".
National Gay Task Force v. Board of Education	729 F.2d 1270	March 14, 1984	District of Utah
The Due Process and Equal Protection Clauses do not prohibit Oklahoma from firing schoolteachers for engaging in "homosexual activity", but the Free Speech Clause does prohibit Oklahoma from firing teachers for advocating for it.
Cleveland v. Piper Aircraft Corp.	985 F.2d 1438	February 16, 1993	District of New Mexico
The Federal Aviation Act does not preempt states from setting their own aviation safety standards. (Note: Key parts of Cleveland's reasoning were rejected by the Supreme Court in Geier v. American Honda Motor Co. (2000).)
Powers v. Harris	379 F.3d 1208	August 23, 2004	Western District of Oklahoma
The Fourteenth Amendment does not prohibit Oklahoma from requiring coffin salespeople to be licensed funeral home directors.
Peoples v. CCA Detention Centers	449 F.3d 1097	September 7, 2005	District of Kansas
Federal inmate at a private prison cannot bring a Bivens action against warden when a remedy is available under state law.
United States v. Andrus	483 F.3d 711	April 25, 2007	District of Kansas
Criminal defendant's father had the apparent authority to consent to search of defendant's computer.
Finstuen v. Crutcher	496 F.3d 1139	August 3, 2007	Western District of Oklahoma
The Full Faith and Credit Clause requires Oklahoma to recognize same-sex couple adoptions.
Simpson v. University of Colorado	500 F.3d 1170	September 6, 2007	District of Colorado
A university can be found liable under Title IX if their policies create a risk of sexual assault to which they are deliberately indifferent.
Dudnikov v. Chalk & Vermilion Fine Arts, Inc.	514 F.3d 1063	January 28, 2008	District of Colorado
Colorado can exercise personal jurisdiction over a company that sends an electronic notice to an intermediary company in a different state, with the intent of affecting the Colorado plaintiffs.
Yes on Term Limits v. Savage	550 F.3d 1023	December 18, 2008	Western District of Oklahoma
The First Amendment prevents Oklahoma from requiring petition circulators to be residents of the state.
Green v. Haskell County Board of Commissioners	568 F.3d 784	June 8, 2009	Eastern District of Oklahoma
The Establishment Clause prevents a monument of the Ten Commandments from being displayed on the Haskell County Courthouse lawn.
Osage Nation v. Irby	597 F.3d 1117	March 5, 2010	Northern District of Oklahoma
Congress intended to, and did, disestablish the Osage Reservation via the Osage Allotment Act of 1906.
American Atheists, Inc. v. Duncan	616 F.3d 1145	March 5, 2010	District of Utah
Utah's commemoration of its state troopers with twelve-foot Latin crosses violated the second prong of the Lemon test. (Note: The Supreme Court recognized the Lemon test to be obsolete in Kennedy v. Bremerton School District (2022).)
Weise v. Casper	593 F.3d 1163	October 26, 2010	District of Colorado
Officer was protected by qualified immunity when they ejected Weise from an event for non-disruptively opposing President George W. Bush, the speaker.
Doe v. Shurtleff	628 F.3d 1217	December 1, 2010	District of Utah
The U.S. Constitution does not prohibit Utah from requiring sex offenders to register their internet identifiers.
The Wilderness Society v. Kane County	632 F.3d 1162	January 11, 2011	District of Utah
A long-running dispute over right of ways through federal land under RS 2477; ultimately dismissed for lack of prudential standing on the part of the environmental groups.
Awad v. Ziriax	670 F.3d 1111	January 10, 2012	Western District of Oklahoma
The Establishment Clause prohibits Oklahoma from banning the use of Sharia law or international law in court.
Brown v. Buhman	822 F.3d 1151	April 11, 2016	District of Utah
Husband and his four wives did not have standing to challenge Utah's ban of bigamy because the county had a policy of only enforcing that law in connection with other crimes.
United States v. Osage Wind, LLC	871 F.3d 1078	September 18, 2017	Northern District of Oklahoma
Osage Wind, in trying to build wind turbines, engaged in unlicensed mining by backfilling minerals extracted during excavation into the foundation.
Lech v. Jackson	791 F. App'x. 711	October 29, 2019	District of Colorado
The Takings Clause does not require Greenwood Village police to compensate the Lechs for breaking into their home to arrest a suspected criminal.
Fitisemanu v. United States	1 F.4th 862	December 27, 2021	District of Utah
The Citizenship Clause does not automatically apply to American Samoa.
Iron Bar Holdings, LLC v. Cape	131 F.4th 1153	October 20, 2025	District of Wyoming
Corner crossing between public lands, without authorization to cross the private lands, is not trespassing when contact is not made with the private land and no damage is done.

== Cases taken by the Supreme Court ==
=== Affirmed ===
- Southwest Utility Ice Co. v. Liebmann, 52 F.2d 349 (10th Cir. 1931)
- United States v. Hudson, 92 F.3d 1026 (10th Cir. 1996)
- Hobby Lobby Stores, Inc. v. Sebelius, 723 F.3d 1114 (10th Cir. 2013)
- ConAgra Foods, Inc. v. Americold Logistics, LLC, 776 F.3d 1175 (10th Cir. 2015)
- Murphy v. Royal, 866 F.3d 1164 (10th Cir. 2017)
- United States v. Denezpi, 979 F.3d 777 (10th Cir. 2020)
- Brock v. Flowers Foods, Inc., 121 F.4th 753 (10th Cir. 2024)

=== Reversed ===
- Lane v. Wilson, 98 F.2d 980 (10th Cir. 1938)
- United States v. Akin, 504 F.2d 115 (10th Cir. 1974)
- Baca v. Colorado Department of State, 935 F.3d 887 (10th Cir. 2019)
- 303 Creative LLC v. Elenis, 6 F.4th 1160 (10th Cir. 2021)

=== Vacated ===
- Dart Cherokee Basin Operating Co. v. Owens, 2013 WL 8609250 (10th Cir. June 20, 2013)

== See also ==
- List of United States courts of appeals cases
