= Gagnon =

Gagnon may refer to:

- Gagnon (surname), people with the surname Gagnon
- Gagnon, Quebec, a ghost town in East-Central Quebec, Canada
- Gagnon River, a river in Quebec, Canada
- Gagnon v. Scarpelli, a United States Supreme Court case
- Asset Marketing Systems, Inc. v. Gagnon, an American court case
- Lac Gagnon Water Aerodrome, a former water aerodrome in Quebec, Canada

== See also ==
- Gagné
