= Judith River (Bécancour River tributary) =

River in Centre-du-Québec, Quebec (Canada)

- Native name: Rivière Judith (French)

Location
- Country: Canada
- Province: Quebec
- Region: Centre-du-Québec
- MRC: Bécancour Regional County Municipality

Physical characteristics
- Source: Agricultural and forest streams
  - location: Bécancour
  - coordinates: 46.297963°N 72.469436°W
  - elevation: 13 m (43 ft)
- Mouth: Bécancour River
  - location: Bécancour
  - coordinates: 46.35333°N 72.44139°W
  - elevation: 10 m (33 ft)
- Length: 6.6 km (4.1 mi)

Basin features
- River system: Nicolet River, St. Lawrence River
- Tributaries
  - left: (upstream)
  - right: (upstream)

The rivière Judith is a tributary of the Bécancour River. It flows in the city of Bécancour, in Bécancour Regional County Municipality, in the administrative region of Centre-du-Québec, in Quebec, in Canada.

== Geography ==
The main neighboring hydrographic slopes of the Judith River are:

- north side: Bécancour River, St. Lawrence River;
- east side: Bécancour River;
- south side: Lac Saint-Paul, Chenal d'en Haut;
- west side: Godefroy River.

The Judith River has its source in an agricultural and forest zone next to highway 30 at Bécancour at 3.5 kilometres (2.2 mi) east of the highway 55.

The Judith River flows on 6.6 kilometres (4.1 mi) towards the northeast in the Sainte-Angèle-de-Laval sector, crossing Highway 30.

The Judith River empties on the west bank of the Bécancour River beside the route 132 bridge, at 2.7 kilometres (1.7 mi) upstream of the confluence of the Bécancour river and at 1.2 kilometres (0.75 mi) downstream of the highway 30 bridge. Its confluence is located opposite the north side of the village of Bécancour, just downstream from Cap des Mares and the Montesson Island.

== Toponymy ==
The toponym "Rivière Judith" was made official on August 17, 1978, at the Commission de toponymie du Québec.

== See also ==
- List of rivers of Quebec
