= Online predator =

Person who commits sexual abuse via the Internet

Online predators or Internet predators are individuals who commit sexual abuse, harassment, grooming, and blackmailing. most commonly against minors and young adults that takes place on the Internet.

== Conceptions ==
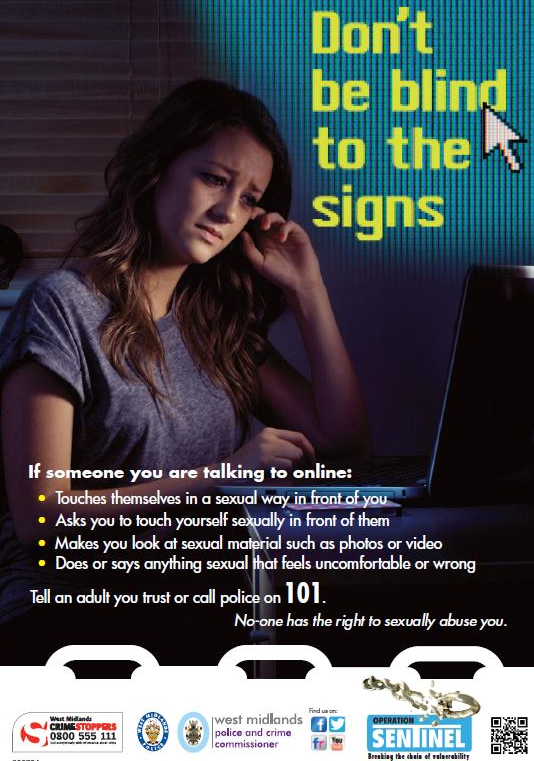
A West Midlands Police poster informing children about how to respond to online predators

Internet-facilitated (cyber) crimes against minors and young adults that involve deceit and begin with adults communicating with minors and young adults over the Internet with the goal of coercing them into sex trafficking, abduction, and abuse . .[1][2]

Chat rooms, instant messaging, Internet forums, social networking sites, cell phones, and even video game consoles have issues with online predations. These online areas attract predators because they allow them to have access to make contact with victims without drawing attention. In addition, there is insufficient reliable data concerning the number of minors sharing personal information online due to children's privacy issues. Also, the anonymity of online conversations leads to the disinhibition of minors, making them feel more comfortable and more likely to engage in risky behaviors. This allows predators to use manipulation to put their targets into situations where they will comply with the predator's sexual demands. Initial manipulation often involves introducing the minors to sexual activity, showing them pornography, and requesting sexually explicit information and pictures. This online predatory behavior does not often lead to actual or attempted offline contact, but it could.

Even though it is the mainstream view that predators will use distinct tactics to meet victims, most actual in-person meetings do not involve any deception. In fact, the minors are usually complicit with perpetrators often using promises of love and romance to seduce victims to meet.

=== Prevention ===
many social media platforms and chatting websites have been involved in controversy as to whether it takes enough precautions against the sexual grooming of children. Jim Gamble, leader of the Child Exploitation and Online Protection Centre (CEOP) in the UK, said in 2010 that his office had received 292 complaints about Facebook users in 2009 but that none of the complaints had come directly from Facebook. A spokesman for Facebook responded to complaints by meeting CEOP directly in person and maintaining that they take safety issues "very seriously".

In 2003, MSN implemented chat room restrictions to help protect children from adults seeking sexual conversations with them.

In 2005, Yahoo! chat rooms were investigated by the New York State attorney general's office for allowing users to create rooms whose names suggested they were being used for this purpose; that October, Yahoo! agreed to "implement policies and procedures designed to ensure" that such rooms would not be allowed.

Computer programs have been developed to analyse chat rooms and other instant messaging logs for suspicious activity. As this can be prevented not only on the platform itself but also at the point of entry, it is recommended that parents establish safe environments for their children to use the Internet, with reduced risk of encountering cyber grooming individuals.

=== Laws ===
In Australia, the murder of Carly Ryan in February 2007 led to public opinion pressure which eventually resulted in nationwide legal changes, nicknamed "Carly's Law", being made in 2017 to help protect minors online. Ryan, aged 15, was a victim of online grooming and predatory behaviour, which was considered unique at the time, given that Ryan was the first person in Australia killed by an online predator.

In the U.S., some risks involving online predatory behavior are addressed by the Children's Internet Protection Act, which was passed in 2000. This law required schools and libraries to install filtering and blocking software, to keep students away from obscene and harmful materials and individuals online. A bill called HR 5319 or the "Deleting Online Predators Act of 2006" (DOPA) was later introduced, intensifying the provisions of CIPA. As of 2007, the bill was effectively defeated.

Some individuals have also initiated actions against laws designed to protect children. Doe v. Shurtleff, 628 F.3d 1217 (10th Cir. 2010), was a United States Court of Appeals for the Tenth Circuit case assessing the constitutionality of Utah Code Ann. § 77-27-21.5, a law that requires sex offenders to register their internet identifiers with the state in order to "assist in investigating kidnapping and sex-related crimes, and in apprehending offenders". In this case, a convicted sex offender, appearing anonymously as John Doe, appealed a decision by the U.S. District Court for the District of Utah to vacate an order enjoining the enforcement of Utah Code Ann. § 77-27-21.5.

In its report Protection of Children Against Abuse Through New Technologies, the Council of Europe Cybercrime Convention Committee addressed the emerging issues of violence against children through the use of new technologies (the issue of child pornography on the Internet is already covered by Article 9 Convention) with particular reference to grooming both through the internet and by mobile telephones.

Some nations have already criminalized online sexual grooming in their national legislation. Analysis of these laws suggests some may be redundant with existing legislation and/or practices.

== See also ==
- Child pornography
- Computer crime
- Catfishing
- Child grooming
- FBI
- Cyberbullying
- Cyberstalking
- Fantasy defense
- National Crime Agency (NCA)
- Pedophilia
- Relationship between child pornography and child sexual abuse
- To Catch a Predator
