= Personal Casualty Gains =

Personal Casualty Gains for individuals for United States Federal Income Tax purposes are defined in section 26 U.S.C. § 165(h)(3)(A) of the Internal Revenue Code as the recognized gain of property arising from fire, storm, shipwreck, or other casualty. The property in question cannot be connected with a trade, business, or transaction entered into for profit. See 26 U.S.C. § 165(c)(3).

== Eligibility ==
Along with persons filing as individuals, a married couple making a joint return for the taxable year are treated as one individual. See 26 U.S.C. § 165(h)(4)(B)

== Tax Consequences ==
Net personal casualty gains are taxed as gains from sales or exchanges of capital assets. See .26 U.S.C. § 165(h)(2)(B)

== Determination ==
Net personal casualty gains are the excess of a taxpayer's personal casualty gains over personal casualty losses in a given taxable year.

== Examples ==
1. A taxpayer’s insured home is destroyed by an accidental fire. Prior to its destruction, the home was valued at its adjusted basis of $100,000 and insured at $130,000. After receiving insurance proceeds, the taxpayer will have a personal casualty gain of $130,000 and a personal casualty loss of $100,000 for a net personal casualty gain of $30,000.
2. A taxpayer owns a vacant lot covered with rocks. The lot has a fair market value of $30,000, but were the rocks not there, it would be worth $35,000. Late at night, a thief removes the rocks. The fair market value increases to $35,000. The taxpayer has a personal casualty gain of $5,000.
