= Board of Education of Oklahoma City v. Dowell =

- Supreme Court of the United States

Argued October 2, 1990 Decided January 15, 1991
- Full case name: Board of Education of Oklahoma City Public Schools, Independent School District No. 80, Oklahoma County, Oklahoma v. Robert L. Dowell, et al.
- Citations: 498 U.S. 237 (more) 111 S. Ct. 630; 112 L. Ed. 2d 715; 1991 U.S. LEXIS 484

Case history
- Prior: Cert. to the United States Court of Appeals for the Tenth Circuit

Holding
- The Court of Appeals' test for dissolving a desegregation decree is more stringent than is required either by this Court's decisions dealing with injunctions or by the Equal Protection Clause of the Fourteenth Amendment.

Court membership
- Chief Justice William Rehnquist Associate Justices Byron White · Thurgood Marshall; Harry Blackmun · John P. Stevens; Sandra Day O'Connor · Antonin Scalia; Anthony Kennedy · David Souter

Case opinions
- Majority: Rehnquist, joined by White, O'Connor, Scalia, Kennedy
- Dissent: Marshall, joined by Blackmun, Stevens
- Souter took no part in the consideration or decision of the case.

Laws applied
- U.S. Const. amend. XIV

Board of Education of Oklahoma City v. Dowell, 498 U.S. 237 (1991), was a United States Supreme Court case "hasten[ing] the end of federal court desegregation orders."

== Facts ==
In 1961 black students and their parents sued the Board of Education of Oklahoma City to end the de jure dual school system. In 1963 the District Court found that Oklahoma was operating a dual school system intentionally. In 1965 the District Court found that residential segregation was the reason that neighborhood zoning had not remedied the past segregation.

In 1972 the Court ordered the Board to follow the "Finger Plan" that would bus black children to all white schools in grades, and bus white children to all black schools.

In 1977 the Board filed a "Motion to Close Case" which was granted after the Court found that "substantial compliance with the constitutional requirements had been achieved":

"The School Board, under the oversight of the Court, has operated the Plan properly, and the Court does not foresee that the termination of its jurisdiction will result in the dismantlement of the Plan or any affirmative action by the defendant to undermine the unitary system so slowly and painfully accomplished"

After demographic changes in 1984 and improved residential integration black students were bussed to more distant schools. The board adopted a Student Reassignment Plan (SRP) to reduce travel times. In 1985 a "Motion to Reopen the Case" was filed by respondents alleging that the return to neighborhood zoning was a return to segregation. The District Court would not reopen the case because the 1977 finding of unitariness was res judicata and there was no mandate for additional desegregation by court order.

The Court of Appeals for the Tenth Circuit reversed. On remand, the District Court found that demographic changes, private decision making and economic factors were too attenuated from the system of de jure segregation.

The Court of Appeals reversed again. Despite the District Court's finding of unitariness made in 1977, the Appeals Court held that "an injunction takes on a life of its own" and the injunctive remedy would remain in effect permanently or indefinitely under United States v. Swift & Co. unless a showing of a "grievous wrong evoked by new and unforeseen conditions" was made.

The Supreme Court reversed the Court of Appeals.

== Supreme Court decision ==
The Supreme Court said the 1977 order did not make dissolution of the injunction res judicata:

the 1977 order did not dissolve the desegregation decree, and the District Court's unitarianess finding was too ambiguous to bar respondents from challenging later action by Board

The Supreme Court agreed with the Court of Appeals that the injunction was not dissolved by the 1977 order because the District Court did not explain what it meant by unitary. The Court did not uphold their reasoning relying on Swift. Federal supervision of school boards was intended to remedy past discrimination. A finding of compliance with that constitutional requirement would be enough to allow the injunction to be dissolved.

The Supreme Court did not dissolve the injunction or reinstate the District Court decision dissolving the injunction. They remanded the case for the District Court to decide if the Board made a sufficient showing that they were compliant with the decree in 1985 when the SRP was adopted, including good faith compliance with the decree and elimination of the "vestiges of past discrimination" based on the Green factors.

== See also ==
- National Gay Task Force v. Board of Education: An employment law case for the Oklahoma City schools
