= Jandreau v. Nicholson =

Jandreau vs. Nicholson
- Court: United States Court of Appeals for the Federal Circuit
- Decided: July 3, 2007
- Citation: 492 F.3d 1372 (2007)

Case history
- Appealed from: United States Court of Appeals for Veterans Claims

Court membership
- Judges sitting: Bryson and Dyk
- Chief judge: Michel

Jandreau vs. Nicholson is a United States Court of Appeals for the Federal Circuit case that dealt with competency of lay testimony as it pertains to establishing a diagnosis of a condition.

== Background ==
Alva Jandreau served in the U.S. Army from May 1957 to May 1959. In 1997, the Veteran filed a claim for residuals of a right shoulder injury. He provided a statement that his right shoulder condition started while in basic training, when he had dislocated his shoulder. He submitted numerous statements on his own behalf, including a statement from a fellow serviceman supporting his claim. He also submitted a medical report from a doctor that opined that his condition was "[r]ight shoulder pain, most likely sequelae of his dislocation of the shoulder." Lastly, he submitted medical reports showing a history of a right shoulder dislocation and pain.

The VA Regional Office denied the claim, citing that there was no evidence of continuity of symptomatology since service. The Board of Veterans' Appeals upheld the denial, reasoning that the report from his doctor simply transcribed Jandreau's own lay history. The Board also found that the statements provided by the Veteran and his fellow service member were not competent, as diagnosing a medical condition, it reasoned, is beyond the range of common experience and knowledge. The Court of Appeals for Veterans Claims ultimately affirmed the Board's decision, holding that competent medical evidence is required when the issue at hand deals with medical etiology or a medical diagnosis.

== Analysis ==
The Federal Circuit, relying on the holding of the Buchanan vs. Nicholson case, found that the Court had erred in its holding. In its analysis, it provided the following framework for when lay evidence can be competent and sufficient to establish a diagnosis:

1. A layperson is competent to identify the medical condition,
2. The layperson is reporting a contemporaneous medical diagnosis, or
3. Lay testimony describing symptoms at the time supports a later diagnosis by a medical professional

== Decision ==
The decision was reversed and remanded.
