= Colorado River Indian Tribes v. National Indian Gaming Commission =

- Court: United States Court of Appeals for the District of Columbia Circuit
- Full case name: Colorado River Indian Tribes, A Federally Recognized Indian Tribe v. National Indian Gaming Commission, ET AL.
- Argued: September 8, 2006
- Decided: October 20, 2006

Case history
- Prior history: Judgment for the Appellee, appeal from the United States District Court for the District of Columbia

Holding
- The Indian Gaming Regulatory Act does not give the National Indian Gaming Commission any regulatory authority over how Class III games are conducted within Indian casinos.

Court membership
- Judges sitting: Arthur Raymond Randolph, David S. Tatel, Harry T. Edwards

Case opinions
- Majority: Randolph, for the court

Colorado River Indian Tribes v. National Indian Gaming Commission, 05-5402 (D.C. Cir. 2006), was a decision of the United States Court of Appeals for the District of Columbia Circuit that was handed down on October 20, 2006.

== See also ==
- United States Court of Appeals for the District of Columbia Circuit
- List of notable United States Courts of Appeals cases
- National Indian Gaming Commission
- Indian Gaming Regulatory Act
