= Miller v. Commissioner =

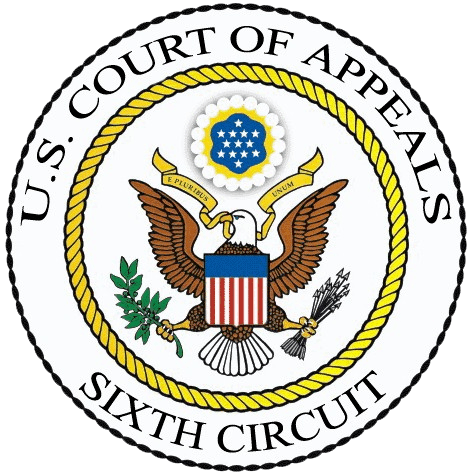
- Court: United States Court of Appeals for the Sixth Circuit
- Full case name: Dixon F. Miller v. Commissioner of Internal Revenue
- Argued: October 10, 1983
- Decided: May 2, 1984
- Citations: 733 F.2d 399; 84-1 USTC (CCH) ¶ 9451

Court membership
- Judges sitting: Pierce Lively, George Clifton Edwards, Jr., Albert J. Engel Jr., Damon Keith, Gilbert S. Merritt Jr., Cornelia Groefsema Kennedy, Boyce F. Martin Jr., Nathaniel R. Jones, Leroy John Contie, Jr., Robert B. Krupansky, Harry W. Wellford (en banc)

Case opinions
- Majority: Wellford, joined by Engel, Merritt, Kennedy, Martin, Krupansky
- Dissent: Contie, joined by Lively, Edwards, Keith, Jones

Laws applied
- Internal Revenue Code, 26 U.S.C. § 165

Miller v. Commissioner, 733 F.2d 399 (6th Cir. 1984) was a case in which the United States Court of Appeals for the Sixth Circuit held that taxpayers are allowed to claim deductions for economic detriments which are a loss and not compensated for by insurance or otherwise regardless whether the property was insured or not.

This case is relevant both to personal taxpayers as well as businesses and allows them to make an informed decision about whether or not to pursue insurance indemnification for their loss. Following this decision, the indemnification can be compared to subsequent insurance effects as well as the potential savings as a result of a tax deduction.

== Facts ==
Plaintiff taxpayer had an undamaged boat and a friend who is a bad captain. Unfortunately he lent his boat to this friend who then ran taxpayer's boat into the ground. Taxpayer was able to collect $200.00 from his friend, reducing taxpayer's actual loss to $642.55. After taking into account the $100.00 limitation under 26 U.S.C. § 165(c)(3), taxpayer claimed a $542.22 casualty loss deduction on his 1976 return. While the taxpayer's boat was insured, he did not file an insurance claim for fear of having his insurance policy revoked. 26 U.S.C. § 165(c)allows a deduction for private parties for losses resulting from a shipwreck.

== Issues ==
The court considered whether a taxpayer's voluntary election not to file an insurance claim for a loss precludes the taxpayer from taking a casualty loss deduction according to 26 U.S.C. § 165.

In plain language: If you damage something that is insured or under warranty but don't make a claim and don't receive compensation, can you still deduct the loss according to 26 U.S.C. § 165.

== Holding ==
The court held that taxpayers are allowed to claim deductions for economic detriments which are a loss and not compensated for by insurance or otherwise regardless whether the property was insured or not.

Plain language example: Someone backs into your car while you are away and breaks a taillight. While you have insurance for the taillight, you don't make a claim because you might lose your insurance or don't want to deal with the paper work. The loss in excess of the limit in 26 U.S.C. § 165(c)3 (currently $100) may be deducted.

== Reasoning ==
The court analyzed the facts of this case in light of two prior and contradicting cases, Kentucky Utilities Co. v. Glenn, 394 F.2d 631 (6th Cir. 1968), and Hills v. C.I.R., 76 T.C. 484 (1981), aff'd., 691 F.2d 997 (11th Cir. 1982). The Kentucky court held that a taxpayer could not deduct a loss according to 26 U.S.C. § 165 if he elected not to file an insurance claim when one was available to him. Kentucky Utilities did not pursue indemnification from an equipment supplier for a technical fault and did not accept a full indemnification from their insurer in order to maintain the business relationship with the manufacturer. In order to claim a deduction, the ""Kentucky"" court required the taxpayer to a) exhaust all reasonable prospects for insurance indemnification before claiming a sustained loss or (b) that 26 U.S.C. § 165 equated "not compensated by" with "not covered by." The deduction claimed by Kentucky Utilities was not allowed.

The Hills court rejected Kentucky and held that Section 165(a) allows a deduction for an economic detriment that (1) is a loss, and (2) is not compensated for by insurance or otherwise. Hills also recognized that "compensated" is distinct from "covered." The Hills court recognized that "All losses compensated by insurance are also… covered by insurance; nonetheless, it should be equally obvious that… all losses covered by insurance are also compensated for, is not necessarily true." ^{2}.

The court in the present case followed the reasoning in Hills and adopted a plain English interpretation of 26 U.S.C. § 165(a) that allows a deduction for an economic detriment that is a loss and (2) is not compensated for by insurance or otherwise.

== Implications ==
The court is avoiding two undesirable consequences of the Kentucky Utilities rule. First, it allows insured taxpayers to decline insurance indemnification without the penalty of not being able to deduct the loss as if they did not have insurance. There are many valid reasons for not involving insurance companies and the tax law should not work against them. Second, taxpayers who carry no insurance or are under-insured are not rewarded with an additional deduction not available to their colleagues who carry the proper amount of insurance coverage.
