= Gagnon River =

River in Centre-du-Québec, Canada

- Native name: Rivière Gagnon (French)

Location
- Country: Canada
- Province: Quebec
- Region: Centre-du-Québec
- MRC: Bécancour Regional County Municipality

Physical characteristics
- Source: Confluence of the "East Arm of the Gagnon River" and the "West Arm of the Gagnon River"
  - location: Bécancour
  - coordinates: 46.31527°N 72.41341°W
  - elevation: 30 m (98 ft)
- Mouth: Bécancour River
  - location: Bécancour
  - coordinates: 46.32472°N 72.45055°W
  - elevation: 9 m (30 ft)
- Length: 5.4 km (3.4 mi)

Basin features
- Progression: Bécancour River, St. Lawrence River
- Tributaries
  - left: (upstream) Bras Ouest de la rivière Gagnon
  - right: (upstream) Bras Est de la rivière Gagnon

The Gagnon River is a tributary of the Upper Channel which flows into Lake Saint-Paul (which flows into the St. Lawrence River via the Godefroy River).

The "Gagnon River" flows through the town of Bécancour, in the Bécancour Regional County Municipality, in the administrative region of Centre-du-Québec, in Quebec, in Canada.

== Geography ==
The main hydrographic slopes of the Gagnon River are:

- north side: Bécancour River, St. Lawrence River;
- east side: Blanche River, Bécancour River;
- south side: Blanche River;
- west side: Chenal d'en Haut, Judith River, St. Lawrence River.

The Gagnon river has its source in an agricultural area of the town of Bécancour, south of the Bécancour River and north of the hamlet of Précieux-Sang. The Gagnon River receives the waters of the "East Arm of the Gagnon River" and the "West Arm of the Gagnon River".

From its source, the Gagnon River flows over 5.4 kilometres (3.4 mi), mainly in agricultural land. On its course, the river crosses the southwestern part of the territory Wolinak.

The Gagnon river empties on the west bank of the "Chenal d'en Haut". Its confluence is located 1.0 kilometre (0.62 mi) east of the Judith river, south of the town of Bécancour and south of the confluence of the Bécancour river.

== Toponymy ==
The toponym "rivière Gagnon" was made official on August 17, 1978, at Commission de toponymie du Québec.

== See also ==
- List of rivers of Quebec
