= Backun v. United States =

- Court: United States Court of Appeals for the Fourth Circuit
- Full case name: Backun v. United States
- Decided: June 10, 1940
- Citation: 112 F.2d 635

Court membership
- Judges sitting: John J. Parker, Morris Ames Soper, Armistead Mason Dobie

Case opinions
- Majority: Parker, joined by Dobie
- Concurrence: Soper

Backun v. United States, 112 F.2d 635 (4th Cir. 1940), is a criminal case that held that the mental element for complicity in a crime is that the accessory had knowledge that aiding or abetting would facilitate the criminal act of the principal, and did not require the accomplice have the same purpose as the principal. The case is contrasted with the Second Circuit case of United States v. Peoni, which held the opposite.
