= Carpenter v. Commissioner =

- Court: United States Tax Court
- Full case name: William H. Carpenter and Nancy C. Carpenter v. Commissioner of Internal Revenue
- Decided: October 18, 1966
- Citations: T.C. Memo. 1966-228; 25 T.C.M. 1186

Court membership
- Judge sitting: Withey

Case opinions
- Decision by: Withey

Laws applied
- Internal Revenue Code

Keywords
- Casualty loss; fair market value

Carpenter v. Commissioner, T.C. Memo. 1966-228 (1966) was a case decided by the United States Tax Court. Carpenter v. Commissioner addressed the issue of whether a husband and wife could deduct the aggregate fair market value of the wife’s engagement ring from their income tax return, as a casualty loss under §165(a) and (c)(3) of the Internal Revenue Code of 1954, after the husband inadvertently dropped the ring in their garbage disposal.

== Facts ==
The petitioners were Nancy Carpenter and William Carpenter. During 1962, Nancy owned a diamond engagement ring worth $1,010. One day, in 1962, Nancy placed the ring in a water-glass of ammonia for purposes of cleaning the ring. Nancy then left the glass, with the ring inside, next to her kitchen sink.

Later that day, William Carpenter was washing dishes, and William inadvertently “picked up the glass and emptied its contents down the” sink drain. William was unaware that the ring was in the glass. William proceeded to run the garbage disposal, which ultimately damaged Nancy’s ring.

The damaged ring was recovered from the garbage disposal and was taken to a jeweler for an appraisal. Immediately before the ring was dropped into the garbage disposal it had an aggregate fair market value of $1,010. The total aggregate fair market value of the ring immediately after being placed in the garbage disposal was $30. Subsequently, William purchased a ring for $169.50 and gave the ring to Nancy.

The petitioners deducted $1,010 from their income tax return as a casualty loss.

== Respondent’s position ==
Nancy did not suffer a casualty loss within the meaning of section §165(a) & (c)(3) of the Internal Revenue Code of 1954. The respondents took the position that by applying the principle of ejusdem generis, it cannot be said that William dropping the ring into the garbage disposal was like or similar to a “fire, storm, or shipwreck.” Therefore, the respondent claimed that this accident did not qualify as “other casualty” under §165. Furthermore, the respondent took the position that the replacement value of the ring, which William subsequently purchased for Nancy, and the salvage value of the original ring, must be offset against the gross loss suffered by Nancy.

== Issue ==
The issue was whether the petitioners, Nancy and William Carpenter could deduct the aggregate fair market value of Nancy’s engagement ring from their income tax return as a casualty loss under § 165(a) and (c)(3) of the Internal Revenue Code of 1954.

== The court’s holding ==
The court held that the petitioners were correct in deducting the aggregate fair market value of the ring from their income tax return as a casualty loss under §165(a) and (c)(3) of the Internal Revenue Code of 1954.

== The court’s reasoning ==
The court relied on the fact that William’s “testimony and demeanor” led the court to believe that William was not the type of person that deliberately would place the ring in the garbage disposal. Therefore, the court concluded that William placed the original ring in the garbage disposal accidentally. Accordingly, the court stated that the damage to the ring resulted from the “destructive force of the disposal coupled with the accident or mischance of placing it therein; that because this is so, the damage must be said to have arisen from fortuitous events over which petitioners had no control.”

Under the facts presented to the court, the court reasoned that the amount of the loss should not be reduced by the value of the second ring. The court explained that William was not an insurer of the ring, and therefore it was difficult to conclude that Nancy had any claim against William for her loss. The court further explained that William merely made another gift to Nancy, as an act of repentance or contrition, and not as a compensatory action.
