= Sampson v. Channell =

- Court: United States Court of Appeals for the First Circuit
- Decided: March 27, 1940
- Citation: 110 F.2d 754 (1st Cir. 1940)

Case history
- Prior history: 27 F. Supp. 213 (D. Mass. 1939)

Court membership
- Judges sitting: Scott Wilson, Calvert Magruder, Peters

Case opinions
- Majority: Magruder, joined by Wilson
- Dissent: Peters

Sampson v. Channell, 110 F.2d 754 (1st Cir. 1940), was a United States Court of Appeals decision interpreting the application of the Erie doctrine (derived from Erie v. Tompkins) where diversity jurisdiction is invoked in a choice of law situation, where a court in one state may be called upon to apply the laws of another state.

The Appellate court concluded that the federal district court must act as if it were a state court of the state in question, so long as the application of the state's substantive law might change the outcome of the case. This led to the anomaly that the federal courts must treat certain things (such as burdens of proof and statutes of limitations) as substantive law, even if the state treats these same things as merely procedural, as a justification for using their own law instead of the law of another state.

== Facts ==
The plaintiff husband and wife were hit by a car in Maine; the driver of the other car was killed. The plaintiffs sued the estate of the dead driver in the Federal District Court in Massachusetts, naming the executor of the dead driver's estate as the defendant and invoking the court's diversity jurisdiction. The District court applied general principles of conflicts of law, determining that Maine law should control the case because that is where the accident happened. Under Maine law, the plaintiffs had the burden of proof to show that they were not contributorily negligent; had the court applied Massachusetts law, the defendant would have had the burden of showing plaintiff's contributorily negligence. The plaintiff appealed, contending that the Massachusetts Federal District Court should have applied the law of Massachusetts.

== Issue ==
1. Should the Fed. Dist. Court have used federal rules of procedure, or the rule of the state?
2. If the rule of the state applies, which state is it?

== Result ==
The United States Court of Appeals for the First Circuit wrote that the policy of the Erie doctrine is not to allow the choice of forum be outcome determinative, stating that "it is unfair and unseemly to have the outcome of litigation substantially affected by the fortuitous existence of diversity of citizenship." Therefore, if applying the law of the state would change the outcome as it might in a burden-of-proof situation where one of the parties is dead, then the Federal Court will treat it as substantive, and apply the law of the state. The question remained as to which state's law would apply.

To determine the solution to this controversy, the Appellate Court asks and answers three questions:

1. If the case had been brought in Massachusetts state court, would Massachusetts have brought in the Maine burden of proof?
  Answer: no, because Massachusetts courts have already held the burden of proof to be merely procedural, and those are decided by the law of the forum.
2. Would the U.S. Supreme Court have any reason to reverse Massachusetts on such a decision?
  Answer: no, because nothing in the Constitution requires Massachusetts to follow the same conflicts of law principles as any other state (especially since the Massachusetts law was statutory).
3. Does the invocation of diversity of citizenship change any of this?
  Answer: no, because Federal District Courts are tied to the law of the state they are in, not free to choose the law of the state they prefer. Besides, then the Fed. Court would have treat the burden-of-proof law of Massachusetts as procedural in order to ignore it, but at the same time would have to treat the burden-of-proof law of Maine as substantive in order to apply it, which would be inconsistent.

Therefore, the judgment was reversed and remanded, with an instruction to the district court to apply the Massachusetts burden of proof.
