= United States v. Harris (1991) =

- Court: United States Court of Appeals for the Seventh Circuit
- Full case name: United States of America v. Lynnette Harris and Leigh Ann Conley
- Argued: May 9, 1991
- Decided: August 30, 1991
- Citations: 942 F.2d 1125; 68 A.F.T.R.2d 91-5482; 91-2 USTC (CCH) ¶ 50,433; 33 Fed. R. Evid. Serv. 967

Court membership
- Judges sitting: Richard Dickson Cudahy, Joel Martin Flaum, Jesse E. Eschbach

Case opinions
- Majority: Eschbach, joined by Cudahy
- Concurrence: Flaum

Laws applied
- Internal Revenue Code

Keywords
- Gift

United States v. Harris, 942 F.2d 1125 (7th Cir. 1991) was a case decided by the United States Court of Appeals for the Seventh Circuit dealing with the exclusion of the value of property acquired by "gift" from the gross income of two income taxpayers.

== Facts ==
David Kritzik, a wealthy widower, was partial to the company of young women. Two of these women were Leigh Ann Conley and Lynnette Harris, twin sisters. Kritzik gave Conley and Harris each more than half a million dollars over the course of several years. As evidence by several letters from Kritzik to Harris, the sisters showered him with great amounts of affection. The United States alleged that the sisters should pay federal income tax on the payments. The government argued that Kritzik's payments to the defendants constituted taxable income while the defendants maintained that such payments were nontaxable gifts.

== Procedural posture ==
In separate criminal trials, Harris and Conley were convicted of willfully evading their income tax obligations regarding the money. The sisters both appealed their convictions.

== The issue ==
Are the sisters guilty of evading federal income taxes by excluding the payments from gross income? The principal issue at trial was the nature of the payments Kritzik made to Conley and Harris. "Gross income" for tax purposes does not include gifts, which are taxable to the donor rather than the recipient. Either Kritzik had to pay gift tax on this money or Harris and Conley had to pay federal income tax.

== Court's holding and reasoning ==
The Court reversed Harris’ and Conley's convictions and remanded the case with instructions to dismiss the indictments against them. The Court, focusing on Kritzik's intent when giving the gifts, opined, "[s]imply put, the record before us does not establish beyond a reasonable doubt that Kritzik's intent was to pay Harris for her services, rather than out of affection or charitable impulse". Therefore, the prosecution did not prove, beyond a reasonable doubt, that the nature of the payments to the sisters was income. The Court did not remand Harris' case for retrial because Harris had no fair warning that her conduct might subject her to criminal tax liability as neither the tax code, the Treasury Regulations, or Supreme Court or appellate cases provide a clear answer to whether Harris owed any taxes or not. Though citing Commissioner v. Duberstein as the "definitive statement" on the distinction between gifts and income, the Court concluded that it provided no answer to the taxability of "transfers of money to a mistress in the context of a long term relationship."

== Significance ==
Transfers to mistresses are not income, they are just gifts.
