= Schism v. United States =

2003 US Federal Circuit court decision

- Court: United States Court of Appeals for the Federal Circuit
- Full case name: William O. Schism and Robert Reinlie v. United States
- Decided: November 18, 2002 2002
- Citation: 316 F.3d 1259

Case history
- Subsequent history: Certiorari denied, June 2, 2003

Court membership
- Judges sitting: Haldane Mayer, Pauline Newman, Paul Redmond Michel, S. Jay Plager, Alan Lourie, Raymond C. Clevenger, Randall R. Rader, Alvin Schall, William Curtis Bryson, Arthur J. Gajarsa, Richard Linn, Timothy B. Dyk, and Sharon Prost

Case opinions
- Majority: Michel, joined by Lourie, Clevenger, Rader, Schall, Bryson, Linn, Dyk, and Prost
- Dissent: Mayer, joined by Newman, Plager, Gajarsa

Schism v. United States, 316 F.3d 1259 (Fed. Cir. 2002), was a case decided by the United States Court of Appeals for the Federal Circuit, on appeal from the United States Court of Federal Claims arising out of a 1998 lawsuit brought against the United States in an attempt to ensure that military benefits promised in exchange for military service would continue. Ultimately, the Federal Circuit heard the case en banc and denied the benefits requested by the plaintiffs, leaving it to Congress to fashion a solution. It has been described as "[o]ne of the most important cases the court decided" in the area of military pay and benefits.

== Facts of the case ==
The Federal Circuit summarized the facts of the case as follows:

The United States sought to encourage people to join the armed services during the World War II and Korean War era and make service a career. Military recruiters, under the direction of superiors, verbally promised recruits that if they served on active duty for at least 20 years, they would receive free lifetime medical care for themselves and their dependents. The government concedes such promises were made in good faith and relied upon. The plaintiffs allege that the promises were fulfilled until 1995 when, the plaintiffs assert, the government breached these implied-in-fact contracts by effectively denying the plaintiffs free care; they had to purchase Medicare Part B insurance in order to be treated by civilian doctors because space was no longer available in military facilities where care and medications were free. We must decide whether the government is bound by those promises. Plaintiffs Schism and Reinlie appealed a summary judgment by the United States District Court for the Northern District of Florida holding that because the promises were not authorized they are not enforceable. Schism v. United States, 19 F.Supp.2d 1287, 1295 (N.D.Fla.1998). The district court concluded that because no statute authorized these promises, no valid contract was formed between the government and plaintiffs (or other similarly-situated military retirees, i.e., those who entered service prior to 1956 and by 1995 were 65 or more years of age).

== Plaintiffs ==
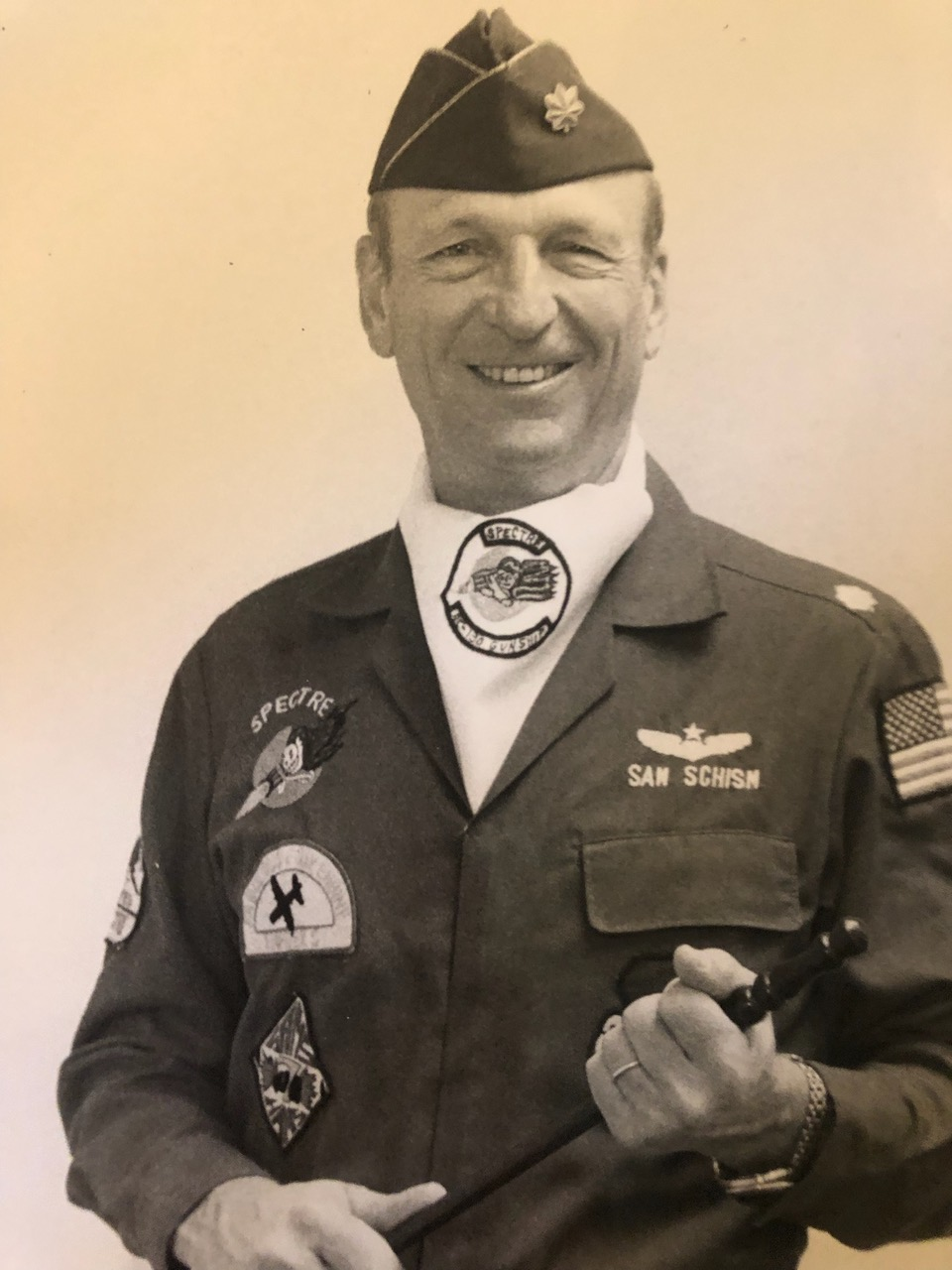

The primary named plaintiff in the case was Lt. Col. William "Sam" O. Schism Jr., a decorated combat Veteran of the US Navy and US Air Force, who had served in WWII, the Korean War, and Vietnam. Schism served in the United States Air Special Operations Command, 4th Air Commando Squadron, 7th Special Operations Squadron, 16th Special Operations Squadron, 919th Special Operations Wing, and for the OSI. His combat and special operation experiences, specifically during the Vietnam conflict, were highlighted in 'Call Sign: Spectre' by Jeff Noecker and 'Spectre Gunner' by David M. Burns. Schism also appeared in the documentary series DC Wings Over Vietnam. Schism was inducted into the Air Commando Association Hall of Fame on October 15, 2022, at the annual ACA awards banquet held in Fort Walton Beach, Florida.

Schism was the aircraft commander (AC) of the Lockheed AC-130A gunship 'The First Lady' (also known as 'The Arbitrator'). Flying out of The Royal Thai Air Force base in Ubon Thailand whilst on a 'truck hunt mission' on March 25, 1971, the aircraft took a direct hit from enemy anti-aircraft attacks over the Ho Chi Minh Trail resulting in a crash landing with zero casualties and full aircraft recovery. Schism was awarded the United States Distinguished Flying Cross for this mission. The 'First Lady' is now on display at the US Air Force Armament Museum located in Fort Walton Beach, Florida.

Schism and fellow plaintiff Robert Reinlie filed Schism v. United States, in the United States District Court for the Northern District of Florida. Schism was represented by Brigadier General and Medal of Honor recipient George "Bud" Day. After the district court denied relief, the case was appealed to the United States Court of Appeals for the Federal Circuit, and then went to the United States Supreme Court, which denied certiorari, thereby upholding the Federal Circuit ruling that any relief needed to come from Congress:

The United States Department of Justice, arguing the case on behalf of the United States, wrote: "We understand and appreciate the dissatisfaction of the plaintiffs with the change in the retirement pay system, as they have rendered long and faithful service to our country in time of peace and war. However, if they are to get any relief, it must come from Congress, as this is not within [a court's] jurisdiction."

== Panel decision ==
The case was initially heard by a judicial panel composed of Chief Judge Haldane Mayer, Judge Pauline Newman, and Judge S. Jay Plager. The panel unanimously found that the recruiters, in promising lifetime healthcare to recruits at the direction of the Department of Defense, were making a valid offer with appropriate consideration to create a binding contract. The government sought en banc review, which was granted.

Following the en banc hearing, the court as a whole reversed the panel in a nine to four decision written by Judge Paul Redmond Michel, which held that the recruiters had no authority to bind the government to the promises that were made because Congress had not provided for such care. All of the original panel members, along with Judge Arthur Gajarsa, dissented from this ruling.
