= Casualty loss =

A casualty loss is a type of tax loss that is a sudden, unexpected, or unusual event. Damage or loss resulting from progressive deterioration of property through a steadily operating cause would not be a casualty loss. “Other casualty” are events similar to “fire, storm, or shipwreck.” It is generally held that wherever force is applied to property which the owner-taxpayer is either unaware of because of the hidden nature of such application or is powerless to act to prevent the same because of the suddenness thereof or some other disability and damage results.

In the United States, tax deductions are allowed for casualty losses under 26 U.S.C. § 165 which allows deductions for losses sustained during the taxable year and not compensated for by insurance or otherwise. Such deductions are limited under 26 U.S.C. § 165(h)(2) to the amount personal casualty losses exceed personal casualty gains plus 10 percent of the adjusted gross income of the individual within the taxable year. Additionally, under 26 U.S.C. § 165(h)(1) individual taxpayers are only allowed to include losses to the extent they exceed $100 for each casualty. In addition, the deduction is limited to those losses sustained during the taxable year and not compensated by insurance, or otherwise.

== Background ==
Under Internal Revenue Code Section 1001(c) all realized losses are deductible except as otherwise not allowed in the Code. For individuals, deductions are mainly limited by Internal Revenue Code Section 165 (c). Deductions for losses are limited to 1) those incurred in a trade or business; 2) those incurred in any transaction entered into for profit; and 3) those personal losses that arise from fire, storm, shipwreck, or other casualty, or from theft. So, in order for an individual to be able to deduct a personal loss, meaning a loss not arising from a business pursuit or a transaction intended to make a profit, the loss must be caused by fire, storm, shipwreck, or other casualty, or theft. While fire, storm, and shipwreck are recognizable and fairly definable, determining what constitutes “other casualty” is less sure.

== Scope ==
Since the language of "casualty loss" is sparse, it has been further explained by the IRS and case law.

=== Revenue Ruling 79-174 ===
Loss from the death of trees by an attack of insects is a casualty loss within the meaning of Internal Revenue Code Section 165(c) (3).

In this case, the taxpayer owned a residential lot upon which 40 ornamental pine trees grew. The trees were healthy on July 1, 1976. By July 10, 1976, all of the trees were dead from an attack by the southern pine beetle.

According to the court, the attack was sudden because it was “of a swift and precipitous nature and not gradual or progressive.” Whether or not an event is sudden is determined by the surrounding facts and circumstances. Since the trees were killed in only ten days, the court determined the attack was sudden.

The attack, in this case, in addition to being sudden, was also unusual and unexpected because there were previously no known attacks of southern pine beetles in the area of the taxpayer’s trees.

=== Carpenter v. Commissioner ===
An event does not need to be an act of nature in order for it to be deemed a casualty loss. In Carpenter v. Commissioner, the taxpayer accidentally dropped a diamond ring down the garbage disposal. The United States Tax Court ruled that the accidental destruction of the diamond ring was a casualty loss and, therefore, deductible.

After hearing the taxpayer testify to the surrounding facts and circumstances, the court determined that the dropping of the ring down the garbage disposal was “inadvertent and accidental.” The “damage to the ring resulted from the destructive force of the disposal coupled with the accident or mischance of placing it therein; that, because this is so, the damage must be said to have arisen from fortuitous events over which the petitioners had no control.” Although the ring was damaged partly because the taxpayer dropped the ring it was still a casualty loss because the taxpayer had no control over the garbage disposal damaging the ring; just as a taxpayer does not have control over fire, storm, or shipwreck so too did the taxpayer not have control over the garbage disposal at that specific point in time.

== Application of the casualty loss deduction ==
According to §62(a)(3), only losses from Sale or Exchange are above the line. Other losses are usually “regular itemized deductions” (below the line) if included in §67(b)’s exceptions.

165(a):

1. Loss must be “sustained” (a. Depends on taxpayer’s reasonable expectation of recovery from the wrongdoer, b. should be resolved independently of any insurance consequences involved, and (2) taxpayer must not have been “compensated” for the loss

165(c):

If a realized loss is not described below, an individual taxpayer cannot deduct the loss.

1. losses incurred in a trade or business

2. losses incurred in profit-motivated transactions

3. casualty and theft losses w/ respect to personal-use property.
