= Sprint PCS, L.P. v. City of La Cañada Flintridge =

Sprint PCS v. La Cañada Flintridge
- Court: United States Court of Appeals for the Ninth Circuit
- Full case name: Sprint PCS, L.P. v. City of La Cañada Flintridge
- Argued: October 19, 2005
- Decided: January 17, 2006
- Citations: 435 F.3d 993 (2006), 2006 U.S. App. LEXIS 1032

Case history
- Prior history: Summary judgment for defendants
- Subsequent history: Rehearing en banc denied, 448 F.3d 1067 (2006)

Holding
- A city cannot deny a telecommunications company a permit to construct and to install a wireless antenna based on aesthetic considerations.

Court membership
- Judges sitting: Cynthia Holcomb Hall, Diarmuid F. O'Scannlain, Richard A. Paez

Case opinions
- Majority: O'Scannlin, joined by Hall, Paez

Laws applied
- California Public Utility Code § 7901; 47 USC § 332(c)(7)(B)(iii).

Sprint PCS v. La Cañada Flintridge, 435 F. 3d 993 (9th Cir. 2006), was a case before the United States Court of Appeals for the Ninth Circuit that determined whether a city could, consistent with California and Federal law, deny a telecommunications company a permit to construct and to install a wireless antenna based on aesthetic considerations.

== Background ==
In October 2001, the city of La Cañada Flintridge enacted Ordinance 324, that described four criteria that applicants must satisfy in order to receive a Public Right-of-Way Above Ground Construction permit:

1. The proposed above-ground structure does not obstruct access for pedestrians, nor block view [sic] of vehicles, pedestrians or bicyclists.
2. The proposed above-ground structure is compatible with existing above-ground structures along the public right-of-way, and does not result in an over-concentration of above-ground structures along the public right-of-way.
3. The proposed above-ground structure preserves the existing character of the surrounding neighborhood, and minimizes public views of the above-ground structure.
4. The proposed above-ground structure does not result in a negative aesthetic impact on the public right-of-way or the surrounding neighborhood.

Sprint applied for 5 permits not long after the city enacted the ordinance and was granted two, denied two, and withdrew one.

The contested permits involved one for a wireless facility along Figueroa St. in December 2001, and another along Descanso Dr. in July 2002 that Sprint intended to construct. Following a series of appeals through the city's Public Works and Traffic Commission, Sprint plead its case to the city council which subsequently denied the permits on the following grounds:

1. The facilities "will significantly damage the existing character of the neighborhood and result in a negative aesthetic impact on the right-of-way"
2. "The proposed Project will change the character of the neighborhood and will result in a negative aesthetic impact on the public right-of-way"
3. "The antennas will negatively impact the residence's views and the character of the neighborhood."
4. The antennas are "unsightly."

Subsequently, Sprint sued the city in United States District Court where a summary judgment was ruled in favor of the city.

== The Decision ==
The court rejected La Cañada's view that aesthetic reasons are substantial evidence to support a denial of permit. The court rejected this reasoning, citing the California Public Utility Code § 7901 only granted local authority the right to control how roads "are accessed," not how they look.

In addition, the city also argued that the Telecom Act (47 United States Code § 332(c)(7)(A)) because it provided that:

[E]xcept as provided in this paragraph, nothing in this Chapter shall limit or affect the authority of a State or local government or instrumentality thereof over decisions regarding the placement, construction, and modification of personal wireless service facilities.

However, the court interpreted this to mean simply that local laws must be respected. As such, "if the local law itself is invalid—for example, because it conflicts with state law—then subsection (c)(7)(A) will not save it. If the Telecom Act intended to grant such authority to local laws—even those that are preempted by state laws—it might have preserved the authority of "State and local government[s]," rather than the disjunctive."
