= United States v. Andrus =

2007 court case about consent to search

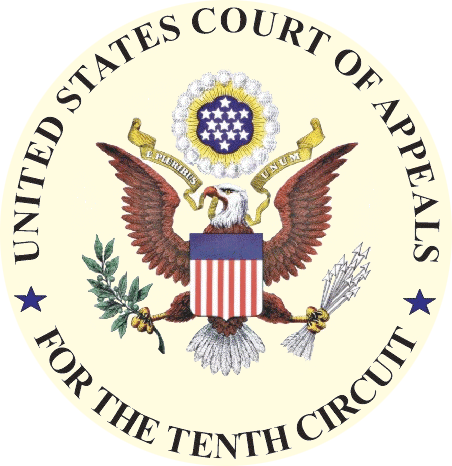
- Court: United States Court of Appeals for the Tenth Circuit
- Full case name: United States v. Ray Andrus
- Decided: April 25, 2007
- Citation: 483 F.3d 711

Court membership
- Judges sitting: Michael R. Murphy, Monroe G. McKay, Neil Gorsuch

Case opinions
- Majority: Murphy, joined by Gorsuch
- Dissent: McKay

Laws applied
- U.S. Const. amend. IV

United States v. Andrus, 483 F.3d 711 (10th. Cir. 2007), decided on April 25, 2007, was a case heard in the Tenth Circuit of the United States Court of Appeals. The court held that defendant's father had the apparent authority to consent to search of defendant's computer.

== Facts of the Case ==
Ray Andrus was a fifty-one-year-old man living with his parents in Leawood, Kansas who was the target of a child pornography investigation. Police visited the Andrus home, where the door was answered by Dr. Andrus, Ray's ninety-one-year-old father. Ray was not home at the time of the investigation.

Dr. Andrus signed a written consent form, authorizing the officers to search the house and any computers in it.

Ray Andrus has his own bedroom in the house, which included a computer in plain sight.

Immediately, the officers brought in forensic equipment that by-passed any computer safeguards and allowed them to search the contents of the machine. The officers did not verify whether the computer was password protected or whether Dr. Andrus had access to the system.

== Apparent Authority ==
Typically, the Fourth Amendment prohibits searches of property without a warrant. However, several exceptions exist that circumvent the need for a warrant. One such exception is voluntary consent. Voluntary consent can be given either by the individual under investigation's Actual Authority or by a third party's Apparent authority.

Apparent Authority is means to actual consent for a search if an officer reasonably believes, even if erroneously, that the third party has the authority to consent. To determine whether a third party is in the position to give Apparent Consent, the court considers whether that third party has either:

1. Mutual use of the property in question via joint access, or
2. Control for most purposes.

Here, the court found apparent authority in this case where:

1. The officers knew that Dr. Andrus owned and lived in the house in which the computer was located.
2. The officers knew that the house has Internet services, paid for by Dr. Andrus.
3. The officers knew that the screen name connected to the Internet bill had been utilized to access child pornography.
4. The officers knew that Ray Andrus lived in the room with the computer, but they also knew that Dr. Andrus had unfettered access to that room.
5. The computer was in plain view in the room and appeared accessible to anyone.
6. Dr. Andrus did not indicate that he did not own the computer.

== Holding ==
The court held that the search was proper because the officers had received consent from a third party with Apparent Authority. They reasoned: "[v]iewed under the requisite totality-of-the-circumstances analysis, the facts known to the officers at the time the computer search commenced created an objectively reasonable perception that Dr. Andrus was, at least, one user of the computer. That objectively reasonable belief would have been enough to give Dr. Andrus apparent authority to consent to a search."

== Dissent ==
The dissent found the officers' belief of apparent authority unreasonable. The search was unreasonable because:

1. The police attached its searching software to the computer before checking whether the computer was password protected
2. In the more than 10 minutes that it took to set up the searching software, the police did not bother to ask Dr. Andrus whether the computer being searched belonged to him.

The dissent would have required the officers to at least check for a password before proceeding with the search, and, if a password was discovered, to determine the ownership of the device before taking further action.
