= Horvath v. City of Leander =

2020 US legal case on employer vaccine policies

Horvath v. City of Leander, No. 18-51011
- Court: United States Court of Appeals for the Fifth Circuit
- Decided: January 9, 2020
- Defendant: City of Leander
- Plaintiff: Brett Horvath
- Citation: Not specified

Case history
- Subsequent action: Not specified

Court membership
- Judge sitting: Not specified

Case opinions
- The Fifth Circuit upheld the decision of the district court, finding that an accommodation may be reasonable even if it is not the preferred accommodation of the person seeking an exemption.

Horvath v. City of Leander, No. 18-51011 (5th Cir. Jan. 9, 2020) is a legal case decided in 2020 by the United States Court of Appeals for the Fifth Circuit, holding that an employer may require employees to receive vaccinations, so long as the employer makes reasonable accommodations to religious objections, even if the accommodations offered are not ideal for the employee.

== Facts ==
Brett Horvath was a firefighter for the city of Leander, Texas, and a Baptist minister in his personal life. In previous years, he had claimed a religious exemption from the influenza vaccination. In 2016, however, when the city imposed a requirement that all firefighters receive the Tdap booster (for diphtheria, tetanus, and pertussis), Horvath was informed that he would not be able to obtain an exemption while continuing to work in his position without further conditions applying. He was given two alternatives, one being transfer to a "code enforcement officer" position with the same pay and benefits, but with a schedule inconvenient to his second job as a minister. The second was to remain as a firefighter but wear a respirator at all times on the job, submit to regular medical tests, and log his body temperature. Horvath refused the transfer option and offered a different proposal of wearing a respirator only when in contact with certain types of potentially ill or vulnerable people. The city rejected Horvath's suggestion, and when he refused to accede to any of the options offered by the city, Horvath was terminated.

== Outcome ==
Horvath sued, and the United States District Court for the Western District of Texas upheld his termination on summary judgment. On appeal the Fifth Circuit upheld the decision of district court. The court found that an accommodation may be reasonable even though it is not the accommodation preferred by the person seeking an exemption. Notably, "the validity of the employee's religious belief did not appear to be in dispute. The issue was whether the City offered a reasonable accommodation". Furthermore, the Fifth Circuit, finding that the proposed transfer was reasonable despite the inconvenience to the plaintiff, noted that it did not need to examine the reasonableness of the second alternative.

The opinion was issued in January 2020, shortly before the beginning of the COVID-19 pandemic. Consequently, it was cited by cases and articles addressing legal responses to vaccination mandates arising from the pandemic. A 2022 review noted that "perhaps presciently, Horvath was a case about mandatory vaccination requirements".
