= Harris v. Harvey (1979) =

United States legal case

- Court: United States Court of Appeals for the Seventh Circuit
- Full case name: Slyvester Harris v. Richard G. Harvey, Jr.
- Decided: August 20, 1979
- Citation: 605 F. 2d 230 (7th Cir. 1979)

Court membership
- Judges sitting: Thomas E. Fairchild, Walter J. Cummings, Jr., William J. Campbell

Case opinions
- Decision by: Cummings, joined by unanimous

Harris v. Harvey 605 F.2d 330 (7th Cir. 1979) was a landmark decision on judicial immunity, brought under the Civil Rights Act (42 U.S.C. § 1983). In it, the United States court of appeals for the Seventh Circuit ruled that intentional acts of public defamation inspired by racial prejudice are not judicial functions, thus establishing that neither judicial or prosecutorial immunity protects a judge who uses the power of their state office to engage in such acts. It has been cited as the first case in the United States where a sitting court judge was sued and lost in a civil action. As decision of the Seventh Circuit, the case is binding precedent in Illinois, Indiana, and Wisconsin, and has been used as persuasive authority in other appellate and district courts.

== Background ==
In 1967 Sylvester Harris was recruited by the mayor of Racine, Wisconsin, to serve as head of the Community Relations Division within the city's Police Department. Though racism was highly prevalent within the police force, Harris had the initial support of police chief and, in 1973 became the first African-American lieutenant in city history. Though largely intended as a public relations post, Harris used his role in the department to aggressively investigate police misconduct, especially against minorities; in many cases, often forwarding complaints of racism (which were routinely ignored by the department) directly to the district attorney's office.

Harris's insistence on dealing directly with complaints of racism by police officers earned him a reputation as a troublemaker from fellow officers, the police union, and the district attorney, and all filed numerous complaints against Harris to the police chief.

In January 1974, Harris was driving home from a nighttime basketball game in civilian attire, when he noticed traffic was stopped by three men who were standing in the street. Harris got out of his vehicle and identified himself as a police officer, to which one of the men (later identified as Dale Vorlob) allegedly replied "you ain't shit nigger" and held a gun to Harris's face. On pulling the trigger, the gun failed to discharge. In his account, Harris says that he attempted to grab the gun from Vorlob, but was knocked to the ground. Eventually Harris was able to draw his sidearm, and kept the three men against a wall until on-duty officers arrived to arrest them.

Several days later, Vorlob (who was on parole for multiple felonies) met with the district attorney. Vorlob claimed to the D.A. that Harris had come to his home two days after the street incident, beat him with a pistol, and threatened his life. Harris denied the claim, and Vorlob later publicly changed his mind after a chance encounter with Harris during a traffic stop. Despite not having a case, the D.A. insisted on pursuing the charges against Harris. Then, in the time leading up to the trial, a judge by the name of Richard G. Harvey, began routinely engaging in public acts intended to harm the credibility of Harris, including reading warrants for Harris's arrest on air at radio stations, writing malicious stories about Harris for local newspapers (often printed across the paper's front page), presiding over secretive "John Doe" hearings, and threatening witnesses and other Judges if they would not testify against Harris. These events eventually led to Harris and his attorney Paul Gossens, to file a lawsuit against Judge Harvey and the D.A.

== Court trials ==
The district court trial hinged upon several questions, including whether Harvey was protected by judicial immunity, whether he was acting under color of law, and whether the claims against him were cognizable under the Equal Protection Clause of the Fourteenth Amendment. The proceedings included evidence from the incident with Vorlob, the ensuing D.A. lawsuit, and over 200 instances of malicious public actions Judge Harvey had made against Harris after indicting him in the Vorlob case. During the proceedings, Judge Harvey was asked about racial commentary he had made in public, specifically in his calling for the removal of that "black bastard" and "goddamned nigger" (referring to Harris) from the police force. Harvey responded in testimony, that he affirmed making the comments, but that they were not racial.

The question to the jury was whether Judge Harvey undertook non-judicial acts which were motivated by racial bias and had inflicted injury on Harris. The case ended with an all-white jury making a judgement in favor of Harris. The jury stated that the acts of Judge Harvey were racially motivated, that Harris had been inflicted injury to his reputation in the community and ability to continue working in the police department, and that the acts perpetrated against him were both racially motivated, and had caused the plaintiff humiliation, embarrassment, and mental distress. The jury awarded Harris what was at the time an unusually large judgement of $260,000 (approx. $1,000,000 in 2018 dollars).

The settlement was upheld by the United States Court of appeals for the Seventh Circuit, which stated that Judge Harvey was not protected by judicial immunity due to his acts 1) taking place outside the courtroom, and 2) not being acts normally performed by a judge. The case has been cited as the first in the United States where a sitting court judge was sued and lost in a civil action. As a decision of the Seventh Circuit, the case is binding precedent in Illinois, Indiana, and Wisconsin, and has been used as persuasive authority in other appellate and district courts.

== Related resources ==
An account Harris's life in Racine and the ensuing court case are told in his 1988 memoir, A Reason for Being: The Syl Harris Story.

The San Francisco Chronicle gave the book a favorable review, calling it “The one man story of how the civil rights movement reached a dead end."
