= Smith v. Pilots Union =

- Court: United States Court of Appeals for the Fifth Circuit
- Full case name: Stuart H. Smith, Jr. v. International Organization Of Masters, Mates and Pilots
- Decided: July 17, 2002
- Citation: 296 F.3d 380 (5th Cir. 2002)

Case history
- Prior history: Appeal from the United States District Court for the Southern District of Louisiana, at New Orleans.
- Subsequent history: Appeal to the United States Supreme Court

Court membership
- Judges sitting: Reynaldo Guerra Garza, E. Grady Jolly, Jacques L. Wiener Jr.

Case opinions
- Majority: Garza, joined by a unanimous court

Laws applied
- National Labor Relations Act § 10(b), 29 U.S.C. § 160(b)

Smith v. Pilots Union, 296 F.3d 380 (5th Cir. 2002), is a court case in which the United States Court of Appeals for the Fifth Circuit held that although third officer aboard an oceangoing cargo vessel was a supervisor, the six-month period of limitations of § 10(b) of the National Labor Relations Act still applies to Smith's suit against the union whether or not he was a supervisor.

== Facts ==
On October 3, 1992, Appellant Stuart H. Smith Jr., was serving as third officer aboard an oceangoing cargo vessel berthed in the Port of New Orleans. Smith was employed by Waterman Steamship Corporation ("Waterman"), the owner and operator of the vessel. On that day, the vessel was undocking when it collided with the dock. The collision caused damage to both the vessel and the dock. Holding Smith responsible, Waterman fired him the following day.

At the time, Smith was a union member belonging to the International Organization of Masters, Mates & Pilots, a division of the International Longshoremen's Association (ILA). The union and Waterman were parties to a collective bargaining agreement (CBA), along with other employers. The agreement contained a grievance mechanism for solving labor-management disputes. Under the agreement, the union had the right to bring a grievance either on its own behalf or on behalf of a member. The agreement further authorized the union to pursue arbitration should the grievance procedure provide an unsatisfactory resolution.

On October 7, 1992, Smith contacted the union and asked it to initiate grievance procedures with respect to his October 4 discharge. He claimed that the discharge was without cause. Smith and the union, each through counsel, exchanged correspondence regarding the grievance for over a year. During that time, the Coast Guard began an investigation of the October 3 collision. The union would not pursue Smith's grievance until it had received a complete report of the Coast Guard's investigation, which was not available until the Coast Guard completed its investigation in July 1999.

== Opinion of the Fifth Circuit ==
The Fifth Circuit, in a decision by Senior Circuit Judge Reynaldo Guerra Garza, affirmed the district court's ruling.

The final conclusion of the Fifth Circuit was that the District court had found that as a statute of limitations, § 10(b) applies only to particular causes of action, not to particular types of people. By its express terms, it applies to § 8 causes of action. It applies to § 301 and duty of fair representation claims by analogy. Section 10(b)'s six-month period of limitations applies to Smith's suit against the Union whether or not he was a supervisor. The Fifth Circuit therefore affirmed the district court's application of the six-month statute of limitations and its grant of summary judgment in favor of the Union.

== Importance of the case ==
While it is entirely a victory for the Union, this was the first time United States District Court has decided the six-month statute of limitation of National Labor Relations Board Act is extended to the supervisory officer instead of Labor Management Act which has no statute of limitation or the customary ten-year statute of limitation under the civil law of the state (Louisiana) where the incident occurred.
