= United States v. Morlang =

1975 case in the US Court of Appeals

- Court: United States Court of Appeals for the Fourth Circuit
- Full case name: United States of America v. Theodore D. Morlang
- Argued: March 7, 1975
- Decided: December 30, 1975
- Citations: 531 F.2d 183; 1 Fed. R. Evid. Serv. 171

Case history
- Prior history: Appeal from the United States District Court for the Southern District of Virginia, at Charleston.

Court membership
- Judges sitting: John D. Butzner, Jr., H. Emory Widener, Jr., Joseph Calvitt Clarke Jr. (sitting by designation)

Case opinions
- Majority: Widener, joined by Clarke
- Dissent: Butzner

United States v. Morlang, 531 F.2d 183 (4th Cir. 1975), was a case decided by the United States Court of Appeals for the Fourth Circuit that held that calling a witness knowing that unfavorable testimony will be given is improper when it allows the proponent to bring in substantive evidence under the guise of witness impeachment.

== Factual background ==
The defendant Morlang was on trial for a conspiracy to bribe the director of the Federal Housing Administration to approve the Hanna Drive development in Charleston, West Virginia. The prosecutor called Morlang's co-conspirator Wilmoth to the stand to testify that Morlang had admitted the scheme to him. Before trial, Wilmoth told the prosecutor that he would deny that Morlang made such an admission. During the trial, Wilmoth did deny hearing an admission from Morlang. The prosecutor called Crist, Wilmoth's cellmate, to testify that Wilmoth told him about an admission about the scheme from Morlang. Morlang was convicted and appealed to the Fourth Circuit.

== Decision ==
=== Majority opinion ===
The Fourth Circuit reversed Morlang's conviction in an opinion by Judge Widener. Even though calling Crist was an ostensibly permissible way to impeach the credibility of Wilmoth, the court understood the tactic as a way to present otherwise inadmissible hearsay to the jury. Because the prosecutor knew that Wilmoth planned to only give adverse testimony, the court reasoned that the prosecution's only reason to call him was to impeach him with the statement about Morlang's admission. The court noted that it is often difficult for juries to distinguish between using a statement only to undermine the credibility of a witness and using the statement to prove what it says. The court held that impeaching Wilmoth was simply a tactic to get Morlang's admission in front of the jury, and it would be difficult for the jury to ignore its substantive value.

=== Butzner's dissent ===
In his dissent, Judge Butzner noted that the prosecutor had other reasons for calling Wilmoth to the stand, like to corroborate other aspects of the crime. Butzner noted that proponents are no longer thought to vouch for the complete credibility of their witnesses. Because the prosecutor had some good faith reasons to call Wilmoth to the stand, Butzner would affirm the conviction.

== Impact ==
The decision in Morlang has been adopted as a standard for identifying abuse of Federal Rules of Evidence Rule 607, which allows the party calling a witness to impeach that witness's credibility. The Morlang standard was followed by the D.C. Circuit in the case United States v. Johnson and by the Ninth Circuit in the case United States v. Gomez-Gallardo.

Morlang has been limited in some circuits to apply only in cases of bad faith. In cases where the proponent has a good faith belief that the witness will at least give some favorable testimony, abuse of FRE 607 has not been found.
