= Konop v. Hawaiian Airlines, Inc. =

2002 U.S. Court of Appeals for the Ninth Circuit case

Konop. v. Hawaiian Airlines, Inc.
- Court: United States Court of Appeals for the Ninth Circuit
- Full case name: Robert C. Konop v. Hawaiian Airlines, Inc.
- Argued: June 8 2000
- Decided: August 23 2002
- Citation: 302 F.3d 868 (2002)

Holding
- Hawaiian Airlines could not be held liable for a violation of the federal Wiretap Act, but could be held liable under the Stored Communications Act.

Court membership
- Judges sitting: Boochever, Paez, Reinhardt

Case opinions
- Majority: Boochever
- Dissent: Reinhardt

Konop v. Hawaiian Airlines, Inc., 302 F.3d 868 (2002) was a case in which the United States Court of Appeals for the Ninth Circuit affirmed in part and overturned in part the ruling of the United States District Court for the Central District of California. An original, unanimous opinion of the Court of Appeals was filed on January 8, 2001 (236 F.3d 1035 (2001)), which overturned the District Court opinion in its entirety. The Department of Justice then sought to intervene in the case at the behest of the National Security Agency (NSA).

The NSA sought intervention by the Department of Justice when the NSA determined that the court's original opinion would potentially limit certain of the agency's monitoring and interception activities, and require court supervision of some signals monitoring which might be deemed "interceptions." The original opinion was withdrawn on August 28, 2001, and a new opinion was filed on August 23, 2002. The withdrawal was reportedly accomplished when the new two (2) judge majority was made to understand that the case would be taken to the Supreme Court unless changes favoring the NSA position were incorporated into the opinion.

In the revised (2002) opinion, which changed the definition of the word "intercept," the court held that the defendant, Hawaiian Airlines, could not be held liable for violation of the federal Wiretap Act when it gained access to the plaintiff's website because the contents of the plaintiff's website were in storage, and thus could not be intercepted under the meaning of the Wiretap Act. This change created a new opportunity for communications to be intercepted by using the inherent 'latency' characteristics of electronic communications relayed through electronic circuitry. The court held, however, that Konop had a potential remedy under the Stored Communications Act, as well as for interference in violation of the Railway Labor Act, and remanded the case back to the District Court.

The Court of Appeals, however, concluded that irrespective of their reinterpretation of the term "intercept," Hawaiian's actions could constitute an illegal access to stored communications. The Court also agreed that the misconduct alleged by Konop, and admitted at trial by Hawaiian, would constitute "interference" with protected labor activities in violation of the Railway Labor Act (45 USC § 145 et seq.). In both of these regards, the Court of Appeals remanded the case back to the U.S. District Court for the Central District of California, in Los Angeles. The Court's reconsidered opinion, however, created a gap in the protections which had previously been enjoyed under the terms of the Electronic Communications Privacy Act. The legislative history otherwise indicated that the protections for "stored communications" had been intended for communications that were contained on a computer hard drive, or some other form of electronic storage which could not necessarily be accessed remotely, or other than by an actual examination of the particular storage device upon which a communications might be stored, including on something like a telephone answering machine.

== Facts ==
Robert Konop, an employee of Hawaiian Airlines, Inc., created and maintained a website where he posted content that was critical of his employer, its officers, and the incumbent union. Konop, through his website, encouraged Hawaiian Airlines employees to consider a different union for representation because the current union supported certain labor concessions that Konop opposed. Konop created a secure website that required visitors to log in using their names and then by creating a password. He created a specific list, composed mostly of Hawaiian Airlines pilots and other employees, who could access the website. Only those people who were eligible to see the website could log on. Once a user logged on, he or she had to accept the site's Terms and Conditions, which prohibited any Hawaiian Airlines management from seeing the site, and prohibited any disclosure of the site's contents to anyone else. This was a process which was later incorporated into the Digital Millennium Copyright Act as a protection for access-limited websites or other access-limited forms of electronic communications.

Two pilots, however, gave Hawaiian Airlines' vice president, James Davis, permission to use their names to access the site. Davis presumably typed in the pilots' names, created passwords, then clicked "submit" to accept the site's terms and conditions. Records show that Davis logged in nearly thirty times under both pilots' names, each time falsely acknowledging Davis' agreement to the Terms and Conditions of Use for Konop's website.

Konop brought suit on his own against Hawaiian Airlines, Inc., alleging that it viewed his secure website without permission, disclosed contents of the site, and violated the federal Wiretap Act, among other claims. Konop was opposed in his case, both in the District Court and on appeal, by the Los Angeles office of the prestigious law firm Gibson, Dunn, & Crutcher, a firm with extensive government connections.

== Law ==
In 1986, the United States Congress passed the Electronic Communications Privacy Act (ECPA), which was intended to afford privacy protection to electronic communications. The Konop court mainly examined Title I of the ECPA, the federal Wiretap Act, 18 U.S.C. §§s 2510–2522 (2000), along with Title II, the Stored Communications Act (SCA), 18 U.S.C. §§s 2701–2711 (2000).

== Discussion ==
The Konop court noted that these two statutes combined to form a "complex, often convoluted, area of the law." The difficulty rests, the court noted, in the fact that the ECPA was written before the advent of the Internet and the World Wide Web.

=== The Wiretap Act ===
The Wiretap Act makes it an offense to "intentionally intercept… any wire, oral, or electronic communication." Thus, the question became whether Konop's website was an "electronic communication," and if so, whether Davis "intercepted" that communication.

An "electronic communication" is "any transfer of signs, signals, writing, images, sounds, data, or intelligence of any nature transmitted in whole or in part by a wire, radio, electromagnetic, photoelectronic or photooptical system.

The court described the process of viewing a website to determine whether the Konop's website was an electronic communication. It said that website owners like Konop transmit electronic documents to servers. When a user wishes to see that document, it requests that he server send a copy of that document to the user's computer. The server then transfers the information from that document, but not the document itself, to the user's computer for the user to view. The court held that Konop's website clearly fits the definition of an "electronic communication."

The court then examined what it meant to "intercept" an electronic document. An interception, under the Wiretap Act, is defined as "the aural or other acquisition of the contents of any wire, electronic, or oral communication through the use of any electronic, mechanical, or other device." The court noted that although this definition seems to encompass all acquisitions of electronic communications regardless of when or how they were obtained, other courts have held that Congress intended a narrower definition of "intercept" with regard to electronic communications.

The Konop court pointed out that since Congress amended the Wiretap Act to eliminate a "storage" requirement from the definition of wire communication, see the Smith court's decision was on par with Congressional intent of eradicating the stringent effects of "storage." Therefore, the Konop court noted that Congress accepted and approved of the Smith court's interpretation of "intercept" as an acquisition contemporaneous with transmission.

The Konop court then examined whether Konop's website was "intercepted" under the Wiretap Act. The court relied on Congressional intent noted above, along with the ordinary meaning of intercept, which means "to stop, seize, or interrupt in progress or course before arrival." The court found that the site's content was acquired by Davis while the information merely sat in electronic storage, and not while the information was in the process of being transmitted. The court, therefore held that because the Wiretap Act only covers interceptions of information that is being contemporaneously transmitted, Konop's claim for violation of the Wiretap Act failed to state a claim upon which relief could be granted.

The court further reasoned that its ruling was consistent with the ECPA's structure, which created the SCA to address "access to stored... electronic communications and transactional records." It said that the level of the protection afforded by the SCA is considerably less than the Wiretap Act's protection. Additionally, the procedures that the SCA set forth for law enforcement to access contents of stored electronic communications is considerably less burdensome than those required to obtain a wiretap under the Wiretap Act. The court said that if it were to extend stored electronic communications to the Wiretap Act, then the government would have to comply with the more burdensome procedures of the Wiretap Act, despite the fact that Congress has already authorized the government to access stored information under the less restrictive SCA. Surely, the court said, Congress could not have intended this result.

== Concurrence/dissent ==
Justice Reinhardt dissented on the court's changed interpretation of the term "intercept." He took the position that "stored electronic communications" are subject to the statute's interception prohibition, rather than, as the majority held, solely to "contemporaneous acquisition." Prior to withdrawal of the original Appeals Court opinion (2001), Reinhardt's position had been the unanimous opinion of the court, as had also been written by Judge Boochever.

To Justice Reinhardt, the main question regarding the statutory provision's difficulties and inconsistencies rested with which reading was more consistent with congressional intent. Justice Reinhardt agreed with the majority that the Wiretap Act covered stored electronic communications under the definition of "electronic communications," but said that the majority unnecessarily added confusion to the statute by holding that "intercept" only refers to contemporaneous acquisition of electronic communications, and that it cannot be possible to "intercept" stored electronic communications.

Reinhardt stated that reading a contemporaneity requirement into the term "intercept" renders the prohibition against electronic communication interception superfluous, and contradicts the axiom that one statute's provision should never negate an accompanying provision.

Reinhardt reasoned that unlike telephone calls, electronic communications spend an infinite amount of time en route. Thus, if one can only intercept during a contemporaneous acquisition as the majority suggests, almost all acquisitions of electronic communication contents would escape the intercept prohibition entirely.

Reinhardt further added that the majority's reasoning that the term intercept would describe different conduct with respect to wire communications than to electronic communications because they both require different actions to intercept fails. He reasoned that because these forms of communication are technologically equivalent to each other, it makes little sense to treat them differently.
