= Joffe v. Google, Inc. =

Joffe V. Google, Inc
- Court: United States Court of Appeals for the Ninth Circuit
- Full case name: Joffe v. Google, Inc.
- Argued: June 10, 2013

Court membership
- Judge sitting: James Ware

Joffe v. Google, Inc. is a federal lawsuit between Ben Joffe and Google, Inc. Joffe claimed that Google broke one of the Wiretap Act segments when they intruded on the seemingly "public" wireless networks of private homes through their Street View application. Although Google tried to appeal their case multiple times, the courts favored Joffe's argument. Ultimately the Supreme Court declined to take the case, affirming the decision by the United States Court of Appeals for the Ninth Circuit that the Wiretap Act covers the interception of unencrypted Wi-Fi communications.

== Background ==
In 2007, Google launched its Street View project, an addendum to the Google Maps feature which captured street-level images from various cities in the US and around the world. Street View vehicles had the ability to intercept and store a vast amount of Wi-fi data from nearby home network due to the intricate technological set up Google created in order to take the pictures in the first place. Google acknowledged in May 2010 that its Street View vehicles had been collecting fragments of payload data from unencrypted Wi-fi networks. This also included any information connected to the internet which was hacked, such as personal emails and passwords. In total Google collected about 600 gigabytes of information from 30 different countries. The Joffe v. Google court case was filed on in November 2010, when Ben Joffe called out Street View for breaching the Wiretap Act. Joffe, representing the voice of the complainants, argued that Google violated the Act, which regulates the collection of actual content of wire and electronic communications and prohibits the intentional interception, use, or disclosure of wire and electronic communications unless a statutory exception applies. Appeals by Google lasted until June 2013. The federal wiretap statute requires someone to get a wiretap order before they monitor or record an individual's or company's communication. It regulates the collection of actual content of wire and electronic communication. Under the act it is illegal to intentionally or purposefully: 1. Intercept, disclose, or use the contents of 2. Any wire, oral, or electronic communication.

== Facts ==
August 2010 cases were transferred to the judicial panel on a multi-district litigation to the Northern District of California . In 2013, Google tried to appeal the case and the court of appeal stood by their original decision because Google is not exempt from the Wiretap Act. On September 10, 2013, the case entered federal judgment by A. Wallace Tashima, Jay S. Bybee and William H. Stafford, Jr.. It was affirmed by Judge: JSB Authoring. May 16, 2013 the case was filed and the hearing began. Attorney Michael H. Rubin represented the appellant Google. The trial took place in San Francisco, the hometown of Google Corporations. Several punitive class actions lawsuits were filed shortly after.

== District Court ==
The court had to address whether data transmitted over unencrypted Wi-Fi networks is an electronic communication that is readily accessible to the general public. Court determined that data transmitted over an encrypted Wi-fi Network is not readily accessible to the general public. This means that whatever information Google was housing was done illegally, without the consent of the owner of the network. The exemption does not apply to Google's conduct. The exemption applies to radio communication, not electronic communication.

== Circuit Court ==
The Ninth Circuit affirmed the district court's holding that the Wiretap Act covers the interception of unencrypted Wi-Fi communications. The court reasoned that such communications did not fall under the ordinary definition of "radio communication" because they were not primarily auditory. Furthermore, such communications did not fall under the "readily accessible to the general public" exception because, even unencrypted Wi-Fi communications are (1) geographically limited, and (2) accessible only with "some difficulty" by "the "general public", because most of the general public lacks the expertise to intercept and decode payload data transmitted over a Wi-Fi network."

== U.S. Supreme Court ==
Google attempted to appeal to the United States Supreme Court, however, it declined to hear the case thus ultimately affirming the District's Court decision.
