= Godefroy River =

River in Centre-du-Québec, Quebec (Canada)

- Native name: Rivière Godefroy (French)

Location
- Country: Canada
- Province: Quebec
- Region: Centre-du-Québec
- MRC: Bécancour Regional County Municipality
- City: Bécancour

Physical characteristics
- Source: Lake Saint-Paul
  - location: Bécancour
  - coordinates: 46.293606°N 72.508261°W
  - elevation: 8 m (26 ft)
- Mouth: St. Lawrence River
  - location: Bécancour
  - coordinates: 46.31222°N 72.53889°W
  - elevation: 5 m (16 ft)
- Length: 3.5 km (2.2 mi)

Basin features
- River system: St. Lawrence River
- Tributaries
  - left: (upstream)
  - right: (upstream)

The Godefroy River (in French: rivière Godefroy) is a tributary of the south shore of the St. Lawrence River. This watercourse flows in the town of Bécancour, in Bécancour Regional County Municipality, in the administrative region of Centre-du-Québec, in Quebec, in Canada.

== Geography ==
The main neighboring watersheds of the Godefroy river are:

- North side: St. Lawrence River
- East side: Bécancour River
- South side: Blanche River
- West side: Arsenault stream

Lake Saint-Paul (length: 4.9 kilometres (3.0 mi); altitude: 6 metres (20 ft)) constitutes the source of the Godefroy River. This body of water is located very close (on the east side) of the intersection of highways 55 and 30, or south of the Laviolette bridge spanning the St. Lawrence River.

The Godefroy River flows on 0.8 kilometres (0.50 mi) westward until Highway 30, which it crosses, and flows on 2.7 kilometres (1.7 mi) northwest in the municipality of Bécancour. This river flows on the southeast shore of the Estuary of Saint Lawrence at 1.4 kilometres (0.87 mi) downstream from Laviolette Bridge connecting Trois-Rivières and Bécancour.

== Toponymy ==
The toponym Godefroy River was formalized on December 5, 1968, at the Commission de toponymie du Québec.

== See also ==
- List of rivers of Quebec
