= Doe v. Shurtleff =

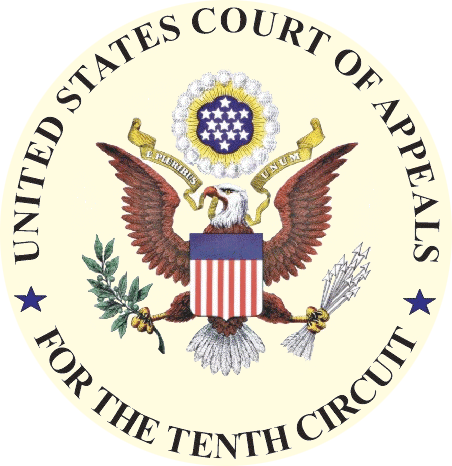
- Court: United States Court of Appeals for the Tenth Circuit
- Full case name: John Doe v. Mark Shurtleff
- Decided: October 26 2010
- Citation: 628 F.3d 1217 (10th Cir. 2010)

Holding
- Affirmed District Court decision. Utah Code Ann. § 77-27-21.5, a Utah statute requiring convicted sex offenders to register their online identifiers, does not violate the First or Fourth Amendments or the Ex Post Facto Clause.

Court membership
- Judges sitting: Neil M. Gorsuch, Monroe G. McKay, Richard D. Cudahy

Case opinions
- Majority: Monroe G. McKay

Laws applied
- Utah Code Ann. § 77-27-21.5, Federal Rule of Civil Procedure 60(b), First Amendment, Fourth Amendment, Ex Post Facto Clause

Doe v. Shurtleff, 628 F.3d 1217 (10th Cir. 2010), was a United States Court of Appeals for the Tenth Circuit case assessing the constitutionality of Utah Code Ann. § 77-27-21.5, a law that requires sex offenders to register their internet identifiers with the state in order to "assist in investigating kidnapping and sex-related crimes, and in apprehending offenders." In this case, a convicted sex offender, appearing anonymously as John Doe, appealed a decision by the United States District Court for the District of Utah to vacate an order enjoining the enforcement of Utah Code Ann. § 77-27-21.5. Even though Doe did not dispute the state's interest in enacting such a statute, he believed that the statute's enforcement ran afoul of his:

1. First Amendment right to engage in anonymous speech;
2. Fourth Amendment rights to privacy and freedom from unreasonable search and seizure; and
3. the Ex Post Facto Clause of the Constitution.

Upon examining Doe's appeal, the Tenth Circuit determined that Utah's registration statute did not violate Doe's First or Fourth Amendment rights or the Ex Post Facto Clause, and therefore affirmed the lower court's decision to lift the injunction.

== Background of the case ==
Doe was convicted by the United States military court system for sex offenses involving a minor and received an 18-month prison sentence. He was released after 13 months' imprisonment and was neither placed on probation nor put on supervised release. However, as a convicted sex offender residing in Utah, Doe was required to register with the Utah Department of Corrections under the Utah Code Ann. § 77-27-21.5. The statute specifically required Doe to provide "'all online identifiers and passwords used to access' websites where he was using an online identifier'". An exception was granted for identifiers associated with employment and financial accounts. Doe refused to register his identifier information and decided to challenge the law.

== Procedural history ==
Doe sued in the District of Utah to enjoin § 77-27-21.5, arguing that the law infringed his First and Fourth Amendment rights and violated the Ex Post Facto Clause. The District Court invalidated the statute on the grounds that it did not specify restrictions on the manner in which the state could use or disclose a registrant's information, thus hindering Doe's ability to exercise his First Amendment right to speak anonymously.

In response to the District Court's ruling, the Utah legislature amended the registration statute to (1) eliminate the password disclosure requirement and (2) set restrictions on state officials' ability to share offenders' online identifiers with the public. According to Subsection 2 of the amended statute:

The [state], to assist in investigating kidnapping and sex-related crimes, and in apprehending offenders, shall:

(a) develop and operate a system to collect, analyze, maintain, and disseminate information on offenders and sex and kidnap offenses;

(b) make information listed in Subsection (27) available to the public [Subsection 27 contains a list of specific types of information, including the offender's physical address, physical description and vehicle license plate number, that must be made publicly available - it specifically excludes internet identifiers]; and

(c) share information provided by an offender under this section that may not be made available to the public under Subsection (27), but only:

(i) for the purposes under this Subsection (2); or

(ii) in accordance with [the Utah Government Records Access and Management Act].

— Utah Code Ann. § 77-27-21.5(2)

The legislature also amended Utah's Government Records Access and Management Act (GRAMA), Utah Code Ann. §§ 63G-2-101 et seq., to designate internet identifiers as "private". Under the GRAMA, "private" information may only be disclosed in limited circumstances, such as when requested by the subject of the record, or pursuant to a court order.

Following these amendments, the State of Utah filed a motion under Federal Rules of Civil Procedure Rule 60(b) requesting that the District Court vacate its order enjoining enforcement of Utah Code Ann § 77-27-21.5 in Doe's case. The District Court granted the motion, holding that:

- amendments to Utah Code Ann. § 77-27-21.5 lessened the statute's chilling effect on anonymous speech, thus it no longer violated Doe's First Amendment rights;
- the statute did not threaten Doe's Fourth Amendment rights because Doe did not have a reasonable expectation of privacy in regard to his internet identifiers;
- and (relying on Femedeer v. Haun, 227 F.3d 1244 (10th Cir. 2000)) the statute did not violate the Ex Post Facto clause.

Doe appealed to the Tenth Circuit.

== Court of Appeals Opinion ==
The Tenth Circuit affirmed the District Court's decision to enforce the statute.

I. Did the registration statute violate the First Amendment?

Doe argued that by forcing him to reveal his online identifiers to the state, the Utah registration statute hindered him from exercising his First Amendment right to engage in anonymous speech. Citing to McIntyre v. Ohio Elections Commission, 514 U.S. 334 (1995), and Reno v. ACLU, 521 U.S. 844 (1997), the Tenth Circuit acknowledged that First Amendment protection for anonymous speech was a well-established precedent, and that this protection had been extended to internet communications. However, the Tenth Circuit went on to explain that "a state may permissibly infringe upon this right when its interest is important enough and the law is appropriately tailored to meet the stated interest."

A. Standard of Review
To determine whether the registration statute was a permissible infringement of Doe's First Amendment rights, the Tenth Circuit first needed to determine whether the statute was a content-based restriction. If so, under First Amendment doctrine, the court would determine the law's constitutionality using a strict scrutiny standard. If not, the court would apply intermediate scrutiny, a laxer standard.

Doe argued that strict scrutiny should be applied because the statute took "away Doe's right to choose whether to speak anonymously or under a pseudonym." The Tenth Circuit, however, disagreed. The court held that the registration statute was a content-neutral regulation because it did not favor or disfavor speech on the basis of ideas expressed in the speech, and was not "aimed at 'suppress[ing] the expression of unpopular views.'" The statute was applied to individuals based on their status as convicted sex offenders, not on the basis of any particular idea that they wanted to express; thus, the statute's restrictions on speech were only incidental to the statute's purpose of aiding the police in solving crimes.

Based on its conclusion that the statute was content-neutral, the Tenth Circuit held that an intermediate scrutiny standard should be applied. Under an intermediate scrutiny standard, a law is upheld if the act:
- (1) serves a "substantial" government interest and
- (2) is "narrowly drawn" to serve that interest without unnecessarily interfering with First Amendment freedoms.

B. Public Disclosure
Having established the standard of review for the constitutionality of Utah Code Ann. § 77-27-21.5, the Court of Appeals went on to assess Doe's substantive claims.

Doe first argued that the registration statute would result in the general public disclosure of sex offenders' internet identifiers, thus significantly chilling anonymous speech, because Subsection (2) of the statute allowed the State to share an offender's online identifier information either "for the purposes under this Subsection (2); or ... in accordance with [the GRAMA]". Doe claimed that because of the use of the word "or" in Subsection (2), state officials would be able to disclose internet identifiers to the general public without the protections afforded by the GRAMA because such disclosure might incidentally "assist in investigating and kidnapping and sex-related crimes," the stated purpose of the subsection. The court disagreed with Doe, holding that the language of Subsection (2) indicated a difference between information that "shall [be made] available to the public" and other information that might be "shared" for purposes of law enforcement or under the terms of the GRAMA. Because the term "share" had been used in the GRAMA and in other Utah privacy statutes to refer to the limited transfer of information between specified (usually government) recipients, and had never been used to refer to the unrestricted disclosure of information to the general public, the court held that it was being used in Subsection (2) of Utah Code Ann. § 77-27-21.5 to refer to limited exchanges of information between law enforcement agencies for law-enforcement purposes. Such exchanges would not significantly deter anonymous speech.

C. Unrestricted Monitoring
Doe also argued that § 77-27-21.5(2) could be broadly interpreted to grant state officials the right to monitor sex offenders' online communications whenever the State deemed it necessary, resulting in the deterrence of speech criticizing oppressive laws or state practices. The Tenth Circuit rejected this argument, reasoning that "to assist in investigating kidnapping and sex-related crimes, and in apprehending offenders" could also be narrowly interpreted to mean that the State may only monitor anonymous communications after a new crime has occurred, and not at all times. The court further noted disclosure of anonymity would occur after the speech had already been made, thus lessening the statute's chilling effect.

D. Overbroad Language
Finally, Doe claimed that the statute violated the First Amendment because it allowed the State to collect identifiers from individuals who were involved in kidnapping offenses. He argued that the underlying offense in kidnapping was not a sex-related crime and that the statute was therefore not "narrowly drawn". The Tenth Circuit rejected this argument because Subsection (2) of the revised statute allowed the collection of information "to assist in investigating" both "kidnapping and sex-related crimes."

II. Did the registration statute violate the Fourth Amendment?

The Tenth Circuit next addressed Doe's Fourth Amendment argument. Doe argued that he had a reasonable expectation of privacy in regard to his online identifiers, and that by forcing him to reveal the identifiers to the State, the registration statute violated Doe's Fourth Amendment right to be free from unreasonable government searches and seizures. Applying precedent from an earlier decision, US v. Perrine, 518 F.3d 1196 (10th Cir. 2008), the Tenth Circuit held that the statute did not violate the Fourth Amendment because Doe did not have a reasonable expectation of privacy in "information that he voluntarily transmitted to the third party internet providers," including his internet identifiers.

III. Was the registration statute an ex post facto law?

Doe's final argument was that Utah Code Ann. § 77-27-21.5 was an unconstitutional ex post facto law because it "constitute[d] additional criminal punishment for crimes previously committed by those subject to its provisions". Citing Femedeer v. Haun, 227 F.3d 1244 (10th Cir. 2000), an earlier case addressing the ex post facto effect of the same statute, but before the internet identifier requirement had been added, the Tenth Circuit held that the registration of sex offenders' internet identifiers was a civil, as opposed to a criminal, penalty. Because it was only a civil penalty, registration of internet identifiers did not violate the Ex Post Facto clause.
