= United States v. Peoni =

American legal case

- Court: United States Court of Appeals for the Second Circuit
- Full case name: United States v. Peoni
- Decided: December 12, 1938
- Citation: 100 F.2d 401

Court membership
- Judges sitting: Learned Hand, Thomas Walter Swan, Harrie B. Chase

Case opinions
- Majority: Hand, joined by a unanimous court

Laws applied
- 18 U.S.C. § 550

United States v. Peoni, 100 F.2d 401 (2d Cir. 1938), was a criminal case that the prosecution must establish that the mental state (mens rea) of an accomplice to a crime include a purpose to aid or encourage, and thereby facilitate the criminal conduct of the principal. This showing of purpose is contrasted with showing knowledge that the principal would commit the crime, which does not necessarily imply that the purpose of acting to aid or abet was to facilitate the criminal act of the principal.

== Background ==
The defendant Peoni possessed bills that he knew to be counterfeit. He sold the bills to Regno, and Regno sold the bills to Dorsey. Dorsey was arrested with the bills while trying to pass them in Brooklyn. At the trial level, Peoni was convicted as an accomplice to Dorsey's possession of the counterfeit bills.

== Opinion of the Court ==
In an opinion by Judge Learned Hand, the Second Circuit reversed Peoni's conviction. The court looked to the statute under which Peoni was indicted, 18 U.S.C. § 550 (the predecessor to 18 U.S.C. § 2), which punished anyone who "aids, abets, counsels, commands, induces, or procures" the commission of a crime. The court read this language to require purpose, and held that Peoni had no purpose regarding the use of the counterfeit bills once he had passed them to Regno. Peoni had no purpose regarding Dorsey's possession because Regno was free to do whatever he wanted with the bills.
