= Asset Marketing Systems, Inc. v. Gagnon =

US appeals court case

- Court: United States Court of Appeals for the Ninth Circuit
- Full case name: Asset Marketing Systems, Inc. v. Kevin Gagnon, d/b/a Mister Computer
- Decided: September 10, 2008

Case history
- Prior actions: Judge Rudi M. Brewster concluded Gagnon had granted AMS an unlimited license to use, modify, and retain the source code of the programs, which led to the defeat of his copyright infringement and trade secret misappropriation claims.

Court membership
- Judges sitting: Barry G. Silverman, Johnnie B. Rawlinson, and Milan D. Smith, Jr.

Case opinions
- Judge Milan D. Smith held that contractor Gagnon impliedly granted AMS an unlimited license, thus, AMS could not have misappropriated contractor's trade secret, and non-competition agreements were invalid.

Asset Marketing Systems, Inc. v. Gagnon was a case heard by the United States Court of Appeals for the Ninth Circuit regarding implied licenses to use, modify and retain the source code of computer programs, and the enforceability of non-competition agreements. The court affirmed the ruling from the United States District Court for the Southern District of California that Kevin Gagnon, a software contractor doing business as "Mr. Computer", had implicitly granted Asset Marketing Systems (AMS) an unlimited license to use, modify and retain the source code of the programs that Gagnon created. The case is notable because the Court held that an implied software license is granted when the licensee requests the creation of a work, the licensor creates and delivers the work, and the licensor intends the licensee to copy and distribute the work.

== Background ==
=== Factual background ===
AMS is a field marketing organization offering sales and marketing support to insurance marketing entities. From May 1999 to September 2003, AMS hired Gagnon, an at-will, independent contractor, to develop custom software to assist with its information technology needs. AMS was Gagnon’s largest client, accounting for $2 million of revenue and 98 percent of his business. From May 2000 through April 2001, AMS and Gagnon entered a Technical Services Agreement, but nothing about a license was mentioned.

AMS claimed that on June 12, 2002, Gagnon signed a Vendor Non-disclosure agreement (NDA) that would have given AMS ownership of all intellectual property developed for AMS by Gagnon. However, Gagnon claimed the document was a forgery.

In June 2003, Gagnon proposed that AMS execute an Outside Vendor Agreement (OVA) to state that all information produced by the contractor would remain property of the contractor, and be licensed to the client on a non-exclusive basis. AMS declined to execute the OVA, but instead countered with a redlined version to read that all information produced by the contractor would be the sole property of the client. The parties never executed the OVA, however. By the end of June 2003, AMS decided to terminate Gagnon's services. AMS extended an employment offer to Gagnon, but Gagnon declined. The two parties then set a target exit date of September 15, 2003.

On September 18, 2003, Gagnon demanded $1.75 million from AMS for the right to continue using the programs, and $2 million for Gagnon's agreement not to sell or disclose the programs to AMS's competitors.

On September 23, 2003, AMS responded by terminating the relationship with Gagnon. AMS's consultant also alleged numerous problems with Gagnon's work. In particular, Gagnon still possessed the source code of the programs and databases that he developed for AMS. Therefore, AMS demanded Gagnon to hand over all copies of the source code immediately, as AMS's trade secrets were allegedly embedded in the software, which AMS argued would preclude any use by Gagnon.

Also on September 23, 2003, seven of Gagnon's 12 employees resigned and began working at AMS to provide directly to AMS the same services they previously provided to AMS through Gagnon. Gagnon contended that each employee had signed a non-compete clause and agreed not to engage in employment with AMS for 24 months without written consent from Gagnon.

In October 2003, Gagnon sent AMS a cease-and-desist letter, claiming that the use of the programs was unauthorized, and demanded AMS to remove "all original and derivative source code" from AMS computers. AMS responded by asserting that Gagnon could not unilaterally stop AMS from using and updating the programs because it had an irrevocable license to use, copy, and modify the programs based on the course of conduct of the parties over the past two-and-a-half years. AMS also stated that Gagnon could not use the programs because it contained AMS's trade secrets. In addition, AMS declined to pay Gagnon the $1.75 and $2 million that Gagnon had requested in September.

=== Procedural background ===
The case began when AMS filed a complaint in California state court against Kevin Gagnon, doing business as Mister Computer, two of his employees, and Gagnon’s new company, National Marketing Technologies, alleging, among other things, misappropriation of trade secrets and conversion. Gagnon removed the case to federal court and then filed counterclaims, alleging copyright infringement, unfair competition under California law, misappropriation of trade secrets, interference with contractual relations, intentional interference with prospective business advantage, and negligent interference with prospective business advantage, and seeking accounting and declaratory relief declaring Gagnon the copyright owner of the programs.

Initially, the district court (then Judge Jones) remanded AMS's state-law claims back to the state court. AMS then refiled its remanded state law claims as counter-counterclaims to Gagnon's federal counterclaims. The district court subsequently granted AMS's motion for summary judgment as to Gagnon's counterclaims. The court found that Gagnon had granted AMS an implied, nonexclusive license to use, modify, and retain the source code of the programs. Consequently, Gagnon's trade secret misappropriation claim was also defeated, and because no trade secret existed as between Gagnon and AMS with respect to the source code, Gagnon's noncompetition agreements were deemed invalid under California law. For the same reasons, Gagnon's remaining state law claims failed.

Gagnon also filed an ex parte application requesting a continuance to obtain the backup tapes of AMS's computers because they might contain email evidence establishing AMS's allegedly unlawful solicitation of Gagnon’s employees, and would help establish the location of the source code at all relevant times. However, this request was denied for several reasons. First, the district court had already determined that the non-competition clause in Gagnon's employment agreements was unenforceable under California law, any evidence showing solicitation was irrelevant. Second, since Gagnon had already acknowledged that the source code was located on AMS's computers, providing conclusive evidence proving the location of the source code was unnecessary. Finally, the ex parte application was untimely because Gagnon did not submit it until after the motion for summary judgment was fully briefed by both parties, and the district court declared the case submitted.

The case was then reassigned from Judge Jones to Judge Brewster. At that point, the parties stipulated to dismiss all counter-counterclaims, and AMS moved for attorney’s fees and costs. Gagnon then appealed the grant of summary judgment to the Ninth Circuit. The Ninth Circuit granted a limited remand so that Judge Brewster could reconsider Judge Jones’s grant of summary judgment. After remand, the district court denied the motion for reconsideration, deferred resolution of attorney’s fees until the resolution of the appeal, and returned the case to the Ninth Circuit.

== Claims ==
Gagnon claimed that AMS's continued use of the six programs constituted copyright infringement because the programs were used by AMS without obtaining a license or Gagnon's permission. AMS claimed to have the right to use the programs and asserted three defenses to Gagnon's copyright infringement claim: an implied license, a transfer of copyright ownership of all intellectual property Gagnon developed via the NDA, and 17 U.S.C. § 117. Gagnon responded that the NDA was a forged document.

== Analysis and holdings ==
The Ninth Circuit held that although exclusive licenses must be in writing, 17 U.S.C. § 204, grants of nonexclusive licenses need not be in writing, and may be granted orally or by implication.

The Ninth Circuit thus affirmed the district court, holding that AMS had an implied unlimited, irrevocable license for the computer programs. Although 17 U.S.C. §204 requires that exclusive licenses be in writing, a court will grant an implied license when: (1) the licensee requests creation of the work; and (2) the licensor makes that particular work and delivers it to the requesting licensee. Here, Gagnon conceded that he created the programs specifically for AMS in response to AMS's request and that AMS paid for the work. The court also held that Gagnon delivered the programs when he installed them onto the AMS computers and stored the source code on-site at AMS, and that his intent to deliver was manifested by his conduct, including the executed TSA, the OVA which he submitted, and his ongoing technical support to AMS.

Since Gagnon's interaction with AMS had granted AMS unlimited, nonexclusive authorization to retain, use, and modify the software, the court affirmed that there was neither copyright infringement nor trade secret misappropriation. The court also upheld the district court's ruling that the non-competition agreements were unenforceable because it was unnecessary to protect Gagnon's trade secret due to the unlimited, nonexclusive license.

The Court further affirmed the denial of Gagnon's ex parte motion, holding that Gagnon needed no additional evidence to oppose AMS's summary judgment motion.
