= Buchanan v. Nicholson =

Buchanan vs. Nicholson
- Court: United States Court of Appeals for the Federal Circuit
- Decided: June 14, 2006
- Citation: 451 F.3d 1331 (Fed. Cir. 2006)

Case history
- Appealed from: United States Court of Appeals for Veterans Claims

Buchanan v. Nicholson, 451 F.3d 1331 (Fed. Cir. 2006) is a United States Court of Appeals for the Federal Circuit case that dealt with the credibility of lay evidence as it pertains to Veterans claims.

== Background ==
The veteran rendered honorable service from January 1973 to December 1975. He served again from 1980 to 1982; however, this period of service was characterized as other than honorable. The Board initially denied his claim for a psychiatric disorder in 1987. He attempted to reopen at the regional office in 1992, resulting in several remand actions by the Board, which culminated in a Board denial in September 2002.

The evidentiary record revealed initial documented psychiatric treatment in 1978. VA examination reports from 1997, 1999, and 2002 indicate that the examiners’ opinions concerning the origins of the veteran's schizophrenia were influenced by the absence of treatment records from service or within the year after separation.

Several lay witnesses’ affidavits, which described their perceptions of the veteran's onset of symptoms in service or soon thereafter, as well as an opinion from a private physician linking the veteran's schizophrenia to service, were submitted in support of the veteran's claim. In discussing the lay evidence, the Board stated that "[r]ecollections of medical problems some 20 years after the veteran’s separation from service have slight probative value and lack credibility absent confirmatory clinical records to substantiate such recollections."

In denying the appeal, the Board found the 2002 VA examination, which included an opinion rejecting a nexus to service based upon the absence of medical documentation, to be the most persuasive. The private medical opinion was discounted as it was based upon lay statements and the 1997 and 1999 VA opinions were deemed equivocal. The United States Court of Appeals for Veterans Claims (Veterans Court), in affirming the Board of Veterans Appeals denial, indicated that the Board did not err in determining that the lay evidence lacked credibility.

== Analysis ==
The Federal Circuit, in discussing the aforementioned statutes and regulations, noted that they clearly provided that competent lay evidence can be sufficient in and of itself to establish a service-connection award without any contemporaneous medical evidence.

The Board erred by improperly determining that the lay statements lacked credibility merely because they were not corroborated by contemporaneous medical records. The Federal Circuit held that the Board's determination was legally untenable because it would render portions of the statutes and regulations meaningless as it would remove the option of establishing service connection based on competent lay evidence. For example, the Federal Circuit pointed to 38 U.S.C. 1154(a), which states:

The Secretary shall include in the regulations pertaining to service-connection of disabilities (1) additional provisions in effect requiring that in each case where a veteran is seeking service-connection for any disability due consideration shall be given to the places, types, and circumstances of such veteran’s service as shown by such veteran’s service record, the official history of each organization in which such veteran served, such veteran’s medical records, and all pertinent medical and lay evidence, and (2) the provisions required by section 5 of the Veterans’ Dioxin and Radiation Exposure Compensation Standards Act (Public Law 98–542; 98 Stat. 2727). (emphasis added)

Additionally, the Federal Circuit also pointed to the fact that 38 C.F.R. §3.307(b) states that the factual basis for proving a chronic disease may be established by "medical evidence, competent lay evidence or both."

The Federal Circuit also stated that, "[w]hile the lack of contemporaneous medical records may be a fact that the Board can consider and weigh against a veteran's lay evidence, the lack of such records does not, in and of itself, render lay evidence not credible."

The Federal Circuit concluded that the Veterans Court erred by affirming the Board's erroneous statutory and regulatory interpretation that lay evidence cannot be credible absent confirmatory clinical records to substantiate the facts described in that lay evidence.

== Decision ==
The case was vacated and remanded to the Veterans Court.
