= National Gay Task Force v. Board of Education =

U.S. Court of Appeals decision on discrimination against gay teachers

National Gay Task Force v. Board of Education of the City of Oklahoma City
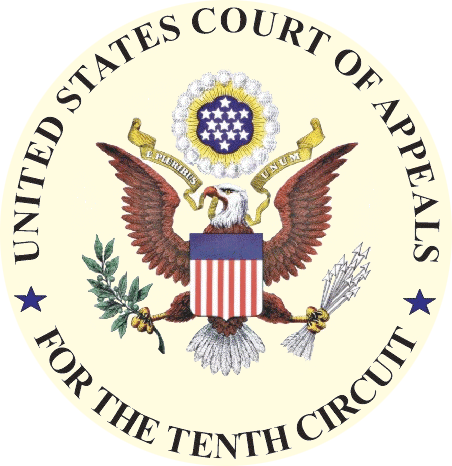
- Court of Appeals Docket: 82-1912
- Court: United States Court of Appeals for the Tenth Circuit
- Full case name: National Gay Task Force, Plaintiff-Appellant v. Board of Education of Oklahoma City, Defendant-Appellee.
- Decided: March 14, 1984.
- Citation: 729 F.2d 1270 (10th Cir. 1984)

Case history
- Subsequent actions: affirmed by an equally divided U.S. Supreme Court, 470 U.S. 903 (1985)

Court membership
- Judges sitting: Judges James E. Barrett, Monroe G. McKay, James Kenneth Logan

Case opinions
- Majority: Logan, joined by McKay
- Dissent: Barrett

Board of Education of Oklahoma City v. National Gay Task Force
- Supreme Court of the United States

Argued January 14, 1985 Decided March 26, 1985
- Full case name: Board of Education of Oklahoma City v. National Gay Task Force
- Docket no.: 83-2030
- Citations: 470 U.S. 903 (more)

Case history
- Prior: 729 F.2d 1270 (10th Cir. 1984)

Holding
- The Tenth Circuit's judgment was affirmed by an equally divided Court.

Court membership
- Chief Justice Warren E. Burger Associate Justices William J. Brennan Jr. · Byron White; Thurgood Marshall · Harry Blackmun; Lewis F. Powell Jr. · William Rehnquist; John P. Stevens · Sandra Day O'Connor

Case opinion
- Per curiam
- Powell took no part in the consideration or decision of the case.

National Gay Task Force v. Board of Education of the City of Oklahoma City, Oklahoma, 729 F.2d 1270 (10th Cir. 1984), was a decision by the Court of Appeals for the Tenth Circuit that upheld in part, and struck down in part, a law allowing schools to fire teachers for public homosexual conduct. It was the first federal appellate court decision to deny that sexual orientation is a suspect classification. It was affirmed by an equally divided vote in the United States Supreme Court.

== Case Facts ==
An Oklahoma state law enacted in 1978 authorized schools to fire teachers for "[engaging] in public homosexual conduct or activity"; and "[has] been rendered unfit, because of such conduct or activity, to hold a position as a teacher, student teacher or teachers' aide. " The National Gay Task Force filed a facial, class-action challenge to this law on First and Fourteenth Amendment grounds.

== District Court Ruling ==
The Tenth Circuit trial court rejected the legal challenges to the statute. On reaching the First Amendment issue, it read a "material and substantial disruption" test into the statute.

== Appellate Court Ruling ==
The Tenth Circuit affirmed in part and reversed in part the district court ruling. With respect to the provision allowing teachers to be fired for engaging in public homosexual activity, the Court rejected due process and equal protection challenges. It held that since the act imposed adverse consequences solely on the basis of public acts, "the right of privacy, whatever its scope in regard to homosexual acts, is not implicated". In weighing the equal protection challenge, the Court rejected the notion that sexual orientation is a suspect classification. It then rejected the equal protection challenge under rational basis review.

On weighing the First Amendment claim, the Court held that the conduct portion of " § 6-103.15 is overbroad, is "not readily subject to a narrowing construction by the state courts," and "its deterrent effect on legitimate expression is both real and substantial."", and the law regulated "pure speech" It held that "[t]he First Amendment does not permit someone to be punished for advocating illegal conduct at some indefinite future time. It used the example of a teacher who went before the Oklahoma legislature or appeared on television to urge the repeal of the Oklahoma anti-sodomy statute would be "advocating," "promoting," and "encouraging" homosexual sodomy and creating a substantial risk that his or her speech would come to the attention of school children or school employees if he or she said, "I think it is psychologically damaging for people with homosexual desires to suppress those desires. They should act on those desires and should be legally free to do so." It held that "the statute by its plain terms is not easily susceptible of a narrowing construction" because "[t]he Oklahoma legislature chose the word "advocacy" despite the Supreme Court's interpretation of that word in Brandenburg [v. Ohio] " And it held that "the deterrent effect of § 6-103.15 is both real and substantial. It applies to all teachers, substitute teachers, and teachers aides in Oklahoma" Thus, the Court concluded that the statute was "unconstitutionally overbroad".

In dealing with the provision that a teacher had to be found unfit before public homosexual conduct can be a basis for termination, it noted that "many adverse effects are not material and substantial disruptions. The statute does not require that the teacher's public utterance occur in the classroom. Any public statement that would come to the attention of school children, their parents, or school employees that might lead someone to object to the teacher's social and political views would seem to justify a finding that the statement "may adversely affect" students or school employees. The statute does not specify the weight to be given to any of the factors listed. An adverse effect is apparently not even a prerequisite to a finding of unfitness"

=== Appellate Court Dissent ===
Judge Barrett dissented, arguing that "[s]odomy is malum in se; i.e., immoral and corruptible in its nature without regard to the fact of its being noticed or punished by the law of the state", and that "[a]ny teacher who advocates, solicits, encourages or promotes the practice of sodomy" in a manner that creates a substantial risk that such conduct will come to the attention of school children or school employees "is in fact and in truth inciting school children to participate in the abominable and detestable crime against nature."

== Supreme Court Proceedings ==
The defendants petitioned for a writ of certiorari, and the United States Supreme Court granted cert. It heard oral arguments on January 14, 1985, with Laurence Tribe representing the respondents. This was the first oral argument before the Supreme Court on any gay rights issue. In oral argument, Justice William Rehnquist noted that the statute had "never been applied to a single living soul", and Tribe countered that the law was a "chilling" and "Draconian" violation of speech, and the Court may reach the merits. The Supreme Court affirmed by an equally divided vote, 4-4, with Justice Lewis Powell abstaining.

== See also ==
- Board of Education of Oklahoma City v. Dowell: Racial desegregation case involving the Oklahoma City schools
- Boy Scouts of America v. Dale, Supreme Court Case ruling that private organizations can exclude membership to homosexuals
- Briggs Initiative, a proposed California initiative identical to the law partially struck down in National Gay Task Force.
- List of LGBTQ-related cases in the United States Supreme Court
