= Simpson v. University of Colorado =

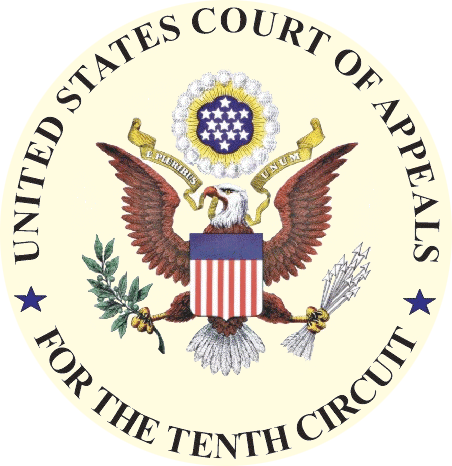
Tenth Circuit Court of Appeals Seal

Lisa Simpson; Anne Gilmore v. University of Colorado Boulder, 500 F.3d 1170 (10th Cir. 2007), was a case in which the Tenth Circuit Court of Appeals ruled that there was enough evidence that the University of Colorado Boulder was deliberately indifferent under Title IX of not taking appropriate measures to limit sexual assault on their campus despite officials, such as Gary Barnett, having a general knowledge of the harassment and the risk of sexual assault occurring.

== Background ==
The case involved a female student, Lisa Simpson, who was allegedly sexually assaulted by a male student, in 2001 while they were both attending the University of Colorado Boulder. Simpson reported the assault to the university, which investigated and found the man responsible for sexual misconduct. However, the university did not take any disciplinary action against him and allowed him to continue attending classes with Simpson. Simpson eventually sued the university, alleging that it had violated her rights under Title IX of the Education Amendments Act of 1972, which prohibits sex discrimination in education.

After the case was dismissed by U.S. District Judge Robert Blackburn an appeal sent the case to trial in 2004, and the jury found the university liable for failing to adequately respond to Simpson's allegations of sexual assault. The jury awarded Simpson $2.5 million in damages, including $1 million in punitive damages. The case raised important questions about the responsibilities of universities in preventing and responding to sexual assault on campus, especially universities that receive federal funding as the impact of this case made the influence of Title IX bigger than what most schools expected. It highlighted the need for universities to take a proactive approach to addressing sexual assault, including educating students about consent, providing support to victims, and holding perpetrators accountable.

== Opinion of The Court ==
The district court made the decision based on the evidence in this case that at the time of the assaults on the plaintiffs: "(1) Coach Barnett, whose rank in the CU hierarchy was comparable to that of a police chief in a municipal government, had general knowledge of the serious risk of sexual harassment and assault during college-football recruiting efforts; (2) Barnett knew that such assaults had indeed occurred during CU recruiting visits; (3) Barnett nevertheless maintained an unsupervised player-host program to show high-school recruits "a good time"; and (4) Barnett knew, both because of incidents reported to him and because of his own unsupportive attitude, that there had been no change in atmosphere since 1997 (when the prior assault occurred) that would make such misconduct less likely in 2001". With these findings the court also found that a jury would find that the need for new training was so obvious that Barnett could be found deliberately indifferent of the need to do so.

== Deliberate Indifference ==
Deliberate indifference is a legal term that describes an official knowing about a potential source of harm occurring and taking no action to help a person they are responsible for from that harm. Deliberate Indifference was initially defined in a United States Supreme Court Case Estelle v Gamble. In Estelle v Gamble deliberate indifference was used in a prison to prisoner relationship as a prisoner did not receive medical attention that was needed, and the prison was deliberately indifferent to his needs. Another case that is relevant to the topic of deliberate indifference is another Supreme Court case Farmer v Brennan. Farmer v Brennan was another prison-based case in which a trans woman was placed in an all-male prison and was subsequently raped. The court ruled that the prison was deliberately indifferent to this fact and the case was seen as influential because it was the first time the Supreme Court had addressed sexual assault in prison.

== Impact ==
With the decision by the court of appeals a grand jury investigation was prompted and as a result an indictment was made with a former recruiting aid being sentenced to probation after pleading guilty, also the University of Colorado's athletic department faced an overhaul as the resignations of both the athletic director and CU system president quickly followed the indictment. The settlement that was reached with Simpson also provided a new advisor independent of the university to monitor Title IX compliance and an additional part-time counselor who will work in CU's Office of Victim's Assistance. The Tenth Circuit sent a message through this case to universities that female students can be harmed when a university is deliberately indifferent and that a university and its officials can be held accountable.
