= Sexual consent in law =

Key aspect in determining verdict

Sexual consent plays an important role in laws regarding rape, sexual assault and other forms of sexual violence. In a court of law, whether the alleged victim had freely given consent, and whether they were deemed to be capable of giving consent, can determine whether the alleged perpetrator is guilty of rape, sexual assault or some other form of sexual misconduct.

Although many jurisdictions do not define what sexual consent is, almost all jurisdictions in the world have determined an age of consent before which children are deemed incapable of consenting to sexual activity; engaging in sex with them thus constitutes statutory rape (see laws regarding child sexual abuse). Many also stipulate conditions under which adults are deemed incapable of consenting, such as being asleep or unconscious, intoxicated by alcohol or another drug, mentally or physically disabled, or deceived as to the nature of the act or the identity of the alleged perpetrator (rape by deception). Most disagreement is on whether rape legislation for otherwise healthy adults capable of consent should be based on them not having given consent to having sex, or based on them being forced through violence or threats to have sex. Some legislation determines that, as long as no coercion is used against them, people capable of consenting always automatically consent to sex (implied consent), whereas other laws stipulate that giving or withholding consent is something which only capable individuals can do on their own volition (freely given or affirmative consent). The 2000s and 2010s have seen a shift in favour of consent-based legislation, which was increasingly considered as providing better guarantees for the legal protection of (potential) victims of sexual violence.

== Coercion-based versus consent-based laws ==
In legal theory, there are two main models in legislation against rape and other forms of sexual violence:

1. The coercion-based model "requires that the sexual act was done by coercion, violence, physical force or threat of violence or physical force in order for the act to amount to rape";
2. The consent-based model "requires that for the act to qualify as rape there must be a sexual act that the other one did not consent to".

The primary advantage of the coercion-based model is that it makes it difficult to make a false accusation of rape or assault, and thus provides decent protection to the legal position and social reputation of suspects who are innocent. This line of reasoning stems from a time (dating at least as far back as the 18th century) when sex was regarded as a private matter that the state and society should mostly not interfere with, and concerns about sexual violence were mostly limited to male-on-female rape, which was firstly regarded as an offence to public morality, especially the female victim's family (her father, husband or master).

In the decades of the later 20th and early 21st century, the focus of sexual violence has shifted towards individual sexual autonomy, the scope has broadened beyond the act of intercourse, the set of potential victims and perpetrators has been expanded to include all genders, strangers as well as acquaintances and people close to the victims including intimate partners and even spouses, while social and legal attitudes have changed in favour of more active societal and state intervention in sexual violence and the attainment of justice.

Individuals and human rights organisations increasingly criticised the coercion-based model for a variety of reasons, such as the requirement for the victim to actively resist an assault (thereby failing to address cases where victims are unconscious, intoxicated, asleep or suffer from involuntary paralysis – also known as "freezing" – due to fear or other state of helplessness, and thus unable to resist an assault) or not wear certain kinds of clothes to not 'provoke' an assault (shifting the responsibility for the crime from the perpetrator unto the victim), or the focus on physical violence (thereby failing to consider that a perpetrator sometimes needs to use little to no physical violence in order to conduct an assault, e.g. when the victim is unconscious, intoxicated, asleep or involuntarily paralysed; and also failing to address mental and psychological harm caused by rape and assault). The consent-based model has been advocated as a better alternative for enhanced legal protection of victims, and to place a larger responsibility on potential perpetrators to actively verify or falsify before initiating sex whether a potential victim actually consents to initiating sex or not, and abstaining from it as long as they do not.

In contrast, legal scholar Jed Rubenfeld argued in a 2013 review that rape laws intend to protect sexual autonomy, yet the only thing that can override somebody's autonomy is coercion, threats, or abusing a state of defenselessness. Strictly speaking, Rubenfeld (invoking Commonwealth of Pennsylvania v. Berkowitz 1994) claimed that any non-consensual situation can be resolved by standing up and leaving the premises, as he deemed rape paralysis to be nonexistent. In civil law, consent is viewed as invalid if it has been obtained by deception. Consent-based rape laws, however, generally do not require either sexual partner to be truthful before obtaining consent. If sexual consent can be obtained by lies or withholding information, the autonomy of the partner is violated.

== International standards, definitions and jurisprudence ==
As of 2018, a consensus is emerging in international law that the consent-based model is to be preferred, stimulated by inter alia the CEDAW Committee, the UN Handbook for Legislation on Violence against Women, the International Criminal Court and the Istanbul Convention. However, there were no internationally agreed upon legal definitions of what constitutes sexual consent; such definitions were absent in human rights instruments.

=== International law ===
In international law, one of the earliest definitions of rape based on a lack of consent, accompanied by a description of consent, can be found in Prosecutor v. Kunarac (decided on 22 February 2001 at the International Criminal Tribunal for the former Yugoslavia or ICTY):

In light of the above considerations, the Trial Chamber understands that the actus reus of the crime of rape in international law is constituted by: the sexual penetration, however slight:

(a) of the vagina or anus of the victim by the penis of the perpetrator or any other object used by the perpetrator; or
(b) of the mouth of the victim by the penis of the perpetrator;
where such sexual penetration occurs without the consent of the victim. Consent for this purpose must be consent given voluntarily, as a result of the victim's free will, assessed in the context of the surrounding circumstances.

This description of consent was adopted almost verbatim in Istanbul Convention Article 36: "Consent must be given voluntarily as the result of the person's free will assessed in the context of the surrounding circumstances". The 2021 Model Rape Law featured the same consent description under IV.D.(c) and V.A.17.

Rule 70 of the Rules of Procedure and Evidence (published in 2002) of the International Criminal Court (which rules on military conflicts between states) gives a summary of illegitimate inferrals of consent that defendants might try to use to claim they had consent:

Rule 70: Principles of evidence in cases of sexual violence

In cases of sexual violence, the Court shall be guided by and, where appropriate, apply the following principles:

(a) Consent cannot be inferred by reason of any words or conduct of a victim where force, threat of force, coercion or taking advantage of a coercive environment undermined the victim's ability to give voluntary and genuine consent;
(b) Consent cannot be inferred by reason of any words or conduct of a victim where the victim is incapable of giving genuine consent;
(c) Consent cannot be inferred by reason of the silence of, or lack of resistance by, a victim to the alleged sexual violence;
(d) Credibility, character or predisposition to sexual availability of a victim or witness cannot be inferred by reason of the sexual nature of the prior or subsequent conduct of a victim or witness.

In June 2021, the then United Nations Special Rapporteur on Violence Against Women Dubravka Šimonović published a Model Rape Law, intended as a "harmonisation tool" for "implementing international standards on rape, as established under international human rights law, international humanitarian law and international criminal law, including as interpreted in the jurisprudence of relevant tribunals and soft law produced by expert mechanisms." It stated inter alia: "Rape is an act of sexual nature committed without consent. Definitions of rape should explicitly include lack of consent and place it at its centre, stipulating that rape is any act of sexual penetration of a sexual nature by whatever means committed against a person who has not given consent." Its section "On consent" combined the Istanbul Convention's description of consent with Rule 70's illegitimate inferrals of consent, adding that "consent need not be explicit in all cases". It proposed an international age of consent at 16, not to criminalise "consensual sexual relations between children younger than 16", and a Romeo and Juliet law around the age of consent threshold. The Model Rape Law stated that "[l]ack of consent is presumed where rape was committed by force, or by threat of force or coercion", or whenever a person was "incapable of giving genuine consent" for a wide range of reasons, including but not limited to being younger than age 16, "unconscious, asleep, or seriously intoxicated as a result of drugs or alcohol consumed voluntarily, involuntarily or unknowingly", or abused by the perpetrator's "relationship or position of power or authority over the victim".

=== African Union ===
Participation in the Belém do Pará Convention, the Maputo Protocol and the Istanbul Convention combined: Signed and ratified Acceded or succeeded Former party Only signed Not signed Not a member state of the AU, CoE or OAS (Note: Denmark has signed and ratified the Istanbul Convention, but it does not apply to Greenland and the Faroe Islands.)

The Protocol to the African Charter on Human and Peoples' Rights on the Rights of Women in Africa (Maputo Protocol) was adopted by the African Union (AU) in 2003 (in effect since 2005), which stipulates that "States Parties shall take appropriate and effective measures to enact and enforce laws to prohibit all forms of violence against women including unwanted or forced sex whether the violence takes place in private or public." Thus, 'unwanted sex', separately from 'forced sex', was recognised as a form of violence against women that is to be effectively prohibited by all 55 member states.

=== ASEAN ===
ASEAN (Association of Southeast Asian Nations), comprising 10 Asian states, adopted the Declaration on the Elimination of Violence against Women and Elimination of Violence against Children in ASEAN on 9 October 2013. In its ASEAN Regional Plan of Action on the Elimination of Violence against Women (ASEAN RPA on EVAW), adopted in November 2015, "rape" was described as "engaging in the non-consensual vaginal, anal or oral penetration of a sexual nature of the body of another person with any bodily part or object, including through the use of physical violence and by putting the victim in a situation where she cannot say no or complies because of fear"; "attempted or completed sexual acts with a woman without her consent" and "intimate touching without consent" were also recognised as forms of "sexual violence". (Note: The ASEAN RPA on EVAW sometimes mentions "sexual violence" as a form of "violence against women" ("VAW") or against "female partner(s)", and once "sexual abuse of female children in the household", but at other times uses gender-neutral language such as 'a person', 'any person', 'another person', or 'someone'.) The ASEAN RPA on EVAW called on all 10 member states to criminalise marital rape; 4 of them had already done so as of February 2016. De Vido (2018), who likened it to the Istanbul Convention, stated: "The framework extremely promising, although the action plan is a non-binding act and the implementation relies on an intergovernmental body."

=== Council of Europe ===
In 2003, the European Court of Human Rights ordered all 47 Member states of the Council of Europe (CoE) to take a consent-based approach to cases of sexual violence on the grounds of Article 3 and Article 8 of the European Convention on Human Rights. This was the result of its ruling in the M.C. v. Bulgaria case, namely: "In accordance with contemporary standards and trends in that area, the Member States' positive obligations under Articles 3 and 8 of the Convention must be seen as requiring the penalisation and effective prosecution of any non-consensual sexual act, including in the absence of physical resistance by the victim."

The Council of Europe's 2011 Convention on preventing and combating violence against women and domestic violence (Istanbul Convention) contains a consent-based definition of sexual violence in Article 36. This mandates all Parties that have ratified the convention to amend their legislation from a coercion-based to a consent-based model. Since the Istanbul Convention entered into force in August 2014, some Parties have fulfilled their obligation for sexual violence legal reform; as of April 2020, 26 Parties had yet to do so, while 12 signatories still needed to ratify the Convention first. Belgium already had a consent-based definition since 1989, the Republic of Ireland already since 1981, with a further amendment passed in February 2017. The United Kingdom's four constituent countries England and Wales (one jurisdiction), Northern Ireland and Scotland separately introduced consent-based legislation in the 2000s despite the UK not having ratified the convention as of 2018. In 2013 and 2016 respectively, Croatia and Austria have introduced separate laws for sexual violence committed by coercion and sexual violence committed by lack of consent, treating the latter as a lesser offence with a lower maximum penalty; this is known as the "two-tiered approach".

=== European Union ===
As of January 2024, the European Union (EU) is in the process of drafting a directive on combating violence against women and domestic violence, in effect an EU-wide application of the principles of the Istanbul Convention (already signed by all member states and the Union itself, and ratified by the vast majority). In 2023, the European Parliament approved a concept text for the directive containing a definition of rape based on a lack of consent. Next, a qualified majority of member states within the European Council was required for its adoption; as of early January 2024, 12 states were in favour, 10 were opposed and 5 yet undecided. If passed, the directive could lead to a harmonisation of legislation across the Union following a consent-based approach to sex crimes.

=== Organization of American States ===
In the 2006 Miguel Castro-Castro Prison v. Peru case, applying to all 35 Member states of the Organization of American States (OAS), the Inter-American Court of Human Rights stated the following: "The Court, following the line of international jurisprudence and taking into account that stated in the Convention to Prevent, Punish, and Eradicate Violence against Women [Belém do Pará Convention], considers that sexual violence consists of actions with a sexual nature committed with a person without their consent (...)". Similarly, in the Declaration on Violence against Girls, Women, and Adolescents and Their Sexual and Reproductive Rights (19 September 2014), the MESECVI Committee (which monitors compliance to the Belém do Pará Convention) defined "sexual violence" as "actions with a sexual nature committed with a person without their consent, which besides including the physical invasion of the human body, may include acts that do not imply penetration or even any physical contact whatsoever," referring to the Miguel Castro-Castro Prison v. Peru judgement. It listed "display of the body without the victim's consent" as one of several "forms of sexual violence against women [which] are still insufficiently documented and punished throughout the entire region [the Americas]", and invoked the illegitimate inferrals of consent listed in Rule 70 of the ICC's Rules of Procedure and Evidence.

== Countries that switched from coercion-based to consent-based laws ==
European overview of sexual violence legislation: Coercion-based legislation Coercion-based legislation; consent-based amendment pending Consent-based legislation Mixed legislation; rape without coercion considered a lesser crime

=== Istanbul Convention countries ===
- 1981: Republic of Ireland (amendment in February 2017)
- 4 July 1989: Belgium. Article 375 (introduced on 4 July 1989): "Rape is every act of sexual penetration of any nature and by any means, committed against a person who did not consent to it. Consent is especially absent when the act is forced by means of violence, coercion (threats, surprise) or deception or enabled by an inferiority/infirmity (Dutch text: onvolwaardigheid; French text: infirmité) or a physical or mental deficiency on the part of the victim." A March 2022 reform bill approved by the Chamber of Representatives inter alia clarifies cases in which consent cannot be given.
- 2000s: United Kingdom's constituent countries:
  - 2003: England and Wales
  - 2008: Northern Ireland
  - 2009: Scotland
- 16 July 2011: Luxembourg. Article 375 states that "any act of sexual penetration (...) upon a person who does not consent to it, especially through the use of violence or grave threats (...) constitutes rape". Lack of consent thus defines the crime; coercion is not required, but should be taken into account if present.
- 18 June 2014: Turkey. Article 102 – (Amended on 18 June 2014 – By Article 58 of Law no. 6545) defines sexual assault as "Any person who violates the physical integrity of another person, by means of sexual conduct". (Note: Turkey: Criminal Code (amended to 2016)) According to a 2018 GREVIO report on Turkey, this definition was consent-based, because paragraph 2 stipulates that "the use of force might entail the additional liability for felonious injury. It is not, therefore, a constituent element of the offence of sexual violence." Article 102 also recognises marital rape. GREVIO hailed this as a major improvement over the previous coercion-based law, but noted the need to reform ways to prosecute marital rape via means other than only the victim's complaint.
- November 2016: Germany. Prior to the 2016 change to the consent-based model, Article 177 already enabled punishment sexual acts that involve victims "incapable of defence against the offender's influence", or "incapable of making and expressing decisions due to illness or disability".
- 6 December 2017: Ukraine. As of August 2022, Article 152 of the Criminal Code of Ukraine states: "Note: Consent shall be deemed voluntary if it is the result of a person's free act and deed, with due account of attending circumstances." Article 152(1) stipulates: "Committing sexual acts involving vaginal, anal or oral penetration into the body of another person using the genitals or any other item, without the voluntary consent of the victim (rape) – shall be punishable by imprisonment for a term of three to five years." Article 153(1) stipulates: "Committing any sexual violence, not related to the penetration into another person's body, without the voluntary consent of the victim (sexual violence) – shall be punishable by imprisonment for a term of up to five years." Paragraph 4 of both articles determines that people below the age of 14 are deemed incapable of consenting, and that punishment for the perpetrator in such cases is more severe. These amendments of the Criminal Code, including the introduction of consent (Ukrainian: згода, romanized: zhóda), were adopted on 6 December 2017 "in order to implement the provisions of the Council of Europe Convention on Preventing and Combating Violence against Women and Domestic Violence". The December 2017 amendments came into force on 11 January 2019. According to the Kyiv Post, this made Ukraine the ninth country in Europe to recognise sex without consent as a crime. The previous text of the Criminal Code of Ukraine, as adopted in 2001, had coercion-based definitions of rape and sexual violence, with Article 152(1) stating: "Rape, that is, sexual intercourse with the use physical violence, threat of its use or with taking advantage of the helpless state of the victim – is punishable by imprisonment for a term of three to five years." Article 153 was originally titled "Violent gratification of sexual passion in an unnatural way", and paragraph 1 defined this as: "Satisfaction of sexual passion in an unnatural way with application of physical violence, threat of its application or with the use of helpless condition of the victim – shall be punishable by imprisonment for a term of up to five years."
- March 2018: Iceland
- May 2018: Sweden
- by October 2018: Montenegro
- 30 October 2020: Cyprus (amended/expanded). Article 144 of the Cypriot Penal Code, in force since independence in 1960, only criminalised vaginal sex with a woman without her consent, by violence or coercion, or by pretending to be a married woman's husband. This formulation did not comply with the Istanbul Convention's standards to also protect men and LGBT people, and include other forms (attempted) nonconsensual sexual acts. Therefore, the Parliament of Cyprus amended the Penal Code on 30 October 2020 by expanding the definition of rape and attempted rape, criminalising it in six different circumstances (article 146), and increasing the standard or maximum penalty for most of these sexual offences to life imprisonment.
- 1 January 2021: Denmark. In April 2017, the Parliament of Denmark rejected a consent-based bill, citing lack of evidence that a consent-based definition was needed. Another attempt failed in November 2018, but a new bill similar to the Swedish example passed in May 2018 gained support in March 2019, and the new Danish government confirmed its intention to introduce such legislation in July 2019. Finally on 17 December 2020, paragraphs 216 and 228 of the Danish Penal Code were amended with a consent-based rape provision, which made having intercourse with a person who did not consent punishable by up to 8 years imprisonment. The amendment, which does not apply to Greenland and the Faroe Islands, went into effect on 1 January 2021.
- 4 June 2021: Slovenia. Criminal Code Article 170 on rape was amended to make the crime based on a lack of consent of the victim rather than use of coercion by the perpetrator. It was the result of a controversial 2015 rape case (of which most criminal proceedings including several appeals were conducted in 2017), in which the suspect had initiated sex with a woman who was drunk and unconscious and therefore could neither consent nor resist. Since the suspect had no need for force or threat when he initiated the sexual act as the complainant was asleep, the High Court of Koper ruled in January 2019 that he had not committed "rape" (Article 170, punished with 1 to 10 years imprisonment), but merely "criminal coercion" (Article 132, for which the suspect was punished with 10 months imprisonment), because when the woman woke up after he had already begun, she started resisting and he used force to complete the deed, but not to initiate it. This ruling caused outrage in Slovenian society, and a coalition of over 20 NGOs spearheaded by the women's rights group Institute 8 March launched a campaign to amend Article 170 with a consent-based definition of rape, with Amnesty International reminding politicians that the country had already ratified the Istanbul Convention in 2015. After the Institute gathered thousands of signatures for a petition, the government tabled its own proposal, which was approved by parliament on 4 June 2021.
- 7 October 2022: Spain. The 2016–2019 La Manada rape case caused widespread outrage in Spanish society, and led to calls for legal reform. Since 2018, the Spanish government stated its intention to introduce a consent-based definition of sexual violence. A bill was approved by the Spanish government in March 2020, the parliamentary debates on the exact wording were expected to take several months. On 26 May 2022, the Spanish Parliament approved the revised bill on sexual consent and sent it to the Senate. The Senate approved the bill on 25 August 2022. After receiving royal assent and being published in the Official State Bulletin on 7 September 2022, the Law for the Comprehensive Guarantee of Sexual Freedom (Spanish: Ley de Garantía Integral de la Libertad Sexual), better known as the "only yes is yes law" (Spanish: ley del solo sí es sí), would enter into force on 7 October 2022. The law would later be amended in April 2023 to close controversial sentencing loopholes.
- 1 January 2023: Finland. In December 2018, citizens' initiative Consent2018 launched a petition to the government to adopt consent-based legislation in accordance with its commitment to the Istanbul Convention. The petition quickly gathered the required 50,000 signatures and was handed to Parliament in June 2019; the same month, the government stated its intention to introduce such legislation. The Finnish Ministry of Justice then established a working group to recommend required reforms by the end of May 2020. The working group's recommendations report was eventually presented to Justice Minister Anna-Maja Henriksson, who praised it, on 7 July 2020. The proposals would go through the first commenting round, return to the ministry in autumn to draft a bill, and then face a second commenting round before being considered by Parliament around spring 2021. The bill was eventually approved, and Finland's new consent-based legislation on sexual offences went into force on 1 January 2023.
- 1 July 2024: the Netherlands. The government had been working on the legal reform since May 2019. The government's proposal to introduce a new separate offence named "sex against one's will" was heavily criticised by Parliament, lawyers, human rights groups such as Amnesty and experts as ambiguous, insufficient to comply with human rights treaties, and affording victims too little protection. In November 2020, Justice Minister Ferdinand Grapperhaus announced to change the draft law to define all forms of nonconsensual sex as sexual violence or rape; under the new proposal, the use of force or coercion could still result in extra penalties. A new draft opened up for consultation in March 2021 proposed the introduction of the new criminal offences of negligent sexual assault and negligent rape (schuldaanranding and schuldverkrachting, literally "guilt assault" and "guilt rape"). This meant that the perpetrator is guilty of negligence if he "performs sexual acts with a person whenever he has serious reason to suspect that the desire of that person to [perform said sexual acts] is lacking" (any such sexual acts are considered aanranding, unless they "constitute or partially constitute sexual penetration of the body", in which case they are verkrachting). Furthermore, there would be two other offences of deliberate rape and deliberate sexual assault (opzetverkrachtig and opzetaanranding) whenever the perpetrator "knows that the desire of that person to [perform said sexual acts] is lacking". "Force, violence or threat" would no longer be necessary to commit the crime, but could result in additional penalties if used. Minister Dilan Yeşilgöz-Zegerius of Justice and Security finally sent the sexual offences bill to the House of Representatives in October 2022, aiming to introduce the law in 2024. Amnesty spoke of "a breakthrough for human rights" because sexual consent was central to the proposal, but called on the House of Representatives and Minister to move forward with implementation and not wait until 2024. On 19 March 2024, the Senate approved the Sexual Offences Act, which would take effect from 1 July 2024.
- 13 February 2025: Poland.
- 8 November 2025: France

=== Other countries ===
World overview of sexual violence legislation: Consent-based legislation; marital rape illegal Coercion-based legislation; marital rape illegal Consent-based legislation, and marital rape legal Coercion-based legislation, and marital rape legal Mixed legislation; rape without coercion considered a lesser crime; marital rape illegal Coercion-based on vaginal sex, consent-based on anal and oral sex; marital rape illegal

Consent-based provisions in some criminal codes of some former British colonies have descended from Section 375 of the British Colonial Penal Code of 1860.

- 1978: Hong Kong: Section 118 of the Hong Kong Crimes Ordinance stipulates in subsection 3: 'A man commits rape if— (a) he has unlawful sexual intercourse with a woman who at the time of the intercourse does not consent to it; and (b) at that time he knows that she does not consent to the intercourse or he is reckless as to whether she consents to it. (Added 25 of 1978 s. 3)'. Subsection 4 adds that the jury has to take into account a man's expressed belief 'that a woman was consenting to sexual intercourse', depending on 'the presence or absence of reasonable grounds for such a belief', and 'in conjunction with any other relevant matters'.
- 1998: Tanzania. Section 5 of the 1998 Sexual Offences (Special Provisions) Act criminalises a male person having sex with a woman or girl without her consent, unless she is his wife (but if he and his wife are separated, it is criminal again). (Note: Tanzania: Sexual Offences (Special Provisions) Act (1998))
- 20 May 2005: New Zealand. The Crimes Act 1961 was amended in 2005, with section 128 defining 'rape' as penetration by penis of someone's genitalia without their consent, and 'unlawful sexual connection' as any other sexual act without consent. Section 128A further stipulates in which scenarios a person is not capable of giving (genuine) consent.
- 21 July 2006: Kenya. The Sexual Offences Act, 2006 states that "a person consents if he or she agrees by choice, and has the freedom and capacity to make that choice." Section 3 stipulates that sexual penetration without consent, or with consent "obtained by force or by means of threats or intimidation of any kind", constitutes rape.
- 14 December 2007: South Africa. The Criminal Law (Sexual Offences and Related Matters) Amendment Act, 2007 repealed the common law offences of rape and indecent assault and replaced them with the new expanded statutory offences of rape and sexual assault, applicable to all forms of sexual penetration or violation without consent, irrespective of gender. "Consent" is defined as "voluntary or uncoerced agreement".
- Australia: all six states, the Northern Territory and the Australian Capital Territory have consent-based laws against what they variously define as 'rape', 'sexual assault', or 'sexual intercourse/penetration without consent'.
- Bangladesh: Section 375 of the Bangladeshi Penal Code is almost identical to the Pakistan Penal Code, which in turn is derived from the same Section 375 in the Indian Penal Code. It states that "a man is said to commit rape who has sexual intercourse with a woman (...) against her will" (1), "without her consent" (2), when consent was obtained by coercion (3), when consent was obtained by identity deception (4), or when she was incapable of consenting due to her age being younger than 16 (5). However, unlike the Pakistan Penal Code, but similar to Indian Penal Code, marital rape of wives from age 13 is not criminalised (since sex within marriage is considered consensual by definition). (Note: Bangladesh: Penal Code (1860, amended to 2008))
- Botswana. Although marital rape is not criminalised, since sex within marriage is considered consensual by definition, non-marital rape is defined as sexual penetration "without the consent of such other person, or with such person's consent if the consent is obtained by force or means of threats or intimidation of any kind".
- Canada. 'Assault' is defined in Section 265(1)(a): "A person commits an assault when, without the consent of another person, he applies force intentionally to that other person, directly or indirectly"; Section 265(2) stipulates that this also applies to sexual assaults. Consent is defined in Section 273.1(1) – as well as Section 153.1(2) – as "the voluntary agreement of the complainant to engage in the sexual activity in question. Consent must be present at the time the sexual activity in question takes place." Sections 271, 272 and 273 criminalise 'Sexual assault', 'Sexual assault with a weapon' and 'Aggravated sexual assault', all three of which spouses may be charged with according to Section 278, thus explicitly criminalising spousal rape. See Sexual assault § Canada for details.
- Egypt. Although a court ruled in 1928 that marital rape is legal, Article 267 of the Egyptian Penal Code (last amended by Law No. 11 of 2011) states that "whoever has sex with a female without her consent" (بغير رضاها يعا bighayr raddaha yaea) has committed rape.
- India. Although marital rape of wives from age 14 is not criminalised (since sex within marriage is considered consensual by definition), Section 375 of the Indian Penal Code stipulates that any man who has sexual intercourse with any woman he is not married to 'against her will' (1), 'without her consent' (2), when consent was obtained by coercion (3), when consent was obtained by identity deception (4), when she was incapable of consenting due to intoxication with a substance (5), when she was incapable of consenting due to her age being younger than 16 (6), has committed rape. Furthermore, Section 377 of the Indian Penal Code provides that any other form of penetrative carnal intercourse with a man, woman or animal is also a crime, although on 6 September 2018, the Supreme Court of India ruled unanimously in Navtej Singh Johar v. Union of India that Section 377 was unconstitutional "in so far as it criminalises consensual sexual conduct between adults".
- Iraq: Article 393 of the Penal Code (as amended in 2010) states: "Any person who has sexual intercourse with a female without her consent or commits buggery with any person without their consent is punishable by a term of imprisonment not exceeding 15 years". However, other forms of sexual assault are only criminalised in Article 396 if they are committed "without his or her consent and with the use of force, menaces, deception or other means", implying that some kind of coercion needs to be demonstrated in order to be considered a crime, and that lack of consent alone is not sufficient. It is not clear whether marital rape is criminalised by Article 393, although the next Article 394 goes on to criminalise sexual intercourse with underage women and buggery of any person "outside of marriage" without their consent if they are below 18 (age of consent) or 15 years of age, implying that Article 393 either concerned people within marriage, aged 18+ years, or both. Article 398 (previously Article 427) is a marry-your-rapist law.
- Myanmar: Section 375 of the Myanmar Penal Code is derived from the same in the Indian Penal Code and states that "a man is said to commit rape who (...) has sexual intercourse with a woman against her will" (1), "without her consent" (2), when consent was obtained by coercion (3), when consent was obtained by identity deception (4), or when she was incapable of consenting due to her age being younger than 14 (5). Just like in the Indian Penal Code, marital rape is not criminalised. (Note: Myanmar: Penal Code)
- Nigeria: Although marital rape is explicitly excluded from the definition of rape in the Northern Nigeria Penal Code provided the spouse has reached puberty (Section 282(2)), and likewise excluded from Section 357 of the Nigerian Criminal Code (applying to the southern states), Section 357 of the Nigerian Criminal Code stipulates that any man who has sexual intercourse with any woman he is not married to "without her consent" (1), when consent was obtained by coercion (2), when consent was obtained by "false and fraudulent representation as to the nature of the act" (3), or when consent was obtained by identity deception (4), has committed rape.
- Pakistan: Section 375 of the Pakistan Penal Code is derived from the same in the Indian Penal Code and states that "a man is said to commit rape who has sexual intercourse with a woman (...) against her will" (1), "without her consent" (2), when consent was obtained by coercion (3), when consent was obtained by identity deception (4), or when she was incapable of consenting due to her age being younger than 16 (5). Unlike the Indian Penal Code, no reference is made to marriage, therefore marital rape is presumed to be criminalised as well. (Note: Pakistan: Penal Code)
- Uganda: Section 123 of the Penal Code states: "Any person who has unlawful carnal knowledge of a woman or girl, without her consent, or with her consent, if the consent is obtained by force or by means of threats or intimidation of any kind or by fear of bodily harm, or by means of false representations as to the nature of the act, or in the case of a married woman, by personating her husband, commits the felony termed rape." Although the Penal Code does not exempt marital rape, there is no clear criminalisation of it either. In customary law, there is a presupposition that a woman implicitly consents to sexual intercourse with her spouse during marriage.
- Zimbabwe: Criminal Law (Codification and Reform) Act (2007) Section 65 states: "If a male person knowingly has sexual intercourse or anal sexual intercourse with a female person and, at the time of the intercourse – the female person has not consented to it; and he knows that she has not consented to it or realises that there is a real risk or possibility that she may not have consented to it, he shall be guilty of rape." A 2007 Center for Reproductive Rights report commissioned by the New York City Bar Association's African Affairs Committee argued that the requirement "that the assailant knew that the complainant had not consented" was "overly restrictive".

== Countries with mixed legislation ==
In this situation, called the "Two-Tiered Approach" by the May 2020 UN Women EGM report, countries have two separate laws against sexual violence: one for sexual violence committed with coercion, one of sexual violence committed without coercion but also without consent; the latter counts as a lesser crime, and is punished less severely. Both the EGM report and Amnesty 2018 report cited Austrian legislation as an example of this two-tiered approach, and have criticised it, because they argued survivors ought to be given the same level of legal protection. This is different from countries that cover all sexual violence within a single law based on a lack of consent, but may add extra penalties if the nonconsensual sexual act was accompanied by some form of coercion.

- 2013: Croatia
  - Sexual intercourse without consent accompanied by force constitutes rape, carrying a maximum penalty of 10 years imprisonment (art. 153 Croatian Criminal Code)
  - Sexual intercourse without consent, and without force (e.g. when a victim is unconscious, intoxicated or asleep), constitutes a lesser offence, carrying a maximum penalty of 5 years imprisonment (art. 152(1) Croatian Criminal Code)
- January 2016: Austria
  - Sexual intercourse committed by force, threat or deprivation of liberty constitutes rape, carrying a maximum of 10 years imprisonment (art. 201 Austrian Criminal Code)
  - Sexual intercourse against a person's will constitutes a lesser offence, carrying a maximum penalty of 2 years imprisonment (art. 205a Austrian Criminal Code)
- 1 July 2019: Greece. The bill, Article 336, was modified to include a consent-based definition of sexual violence, and included in the new Greek penal code on 6 June 2019. Article 336 went into effect on 1 July 2019.
  - Sexual acts committed by force of coercion shall be punished by imprisonment of at least ten years (τουλάχιστον δέκα ετών) (art. 336.1 Greek Penal Code).
  - Sexual acts committed without consent, and without force or coercion, shall be punished by imprisonment of up to ten years (έως δέκα έτη) (art. 336.4 Greek Penal Code).

== Countries with coercion-based legislation ==
=== Africa ===
All 55 sovereign states of Africa are members of the African Union; except Botswana, Egypt, and Morocco, all have signed the Maputo Protocol, which requires member states to effectively prohibit "all forms of violence against women including unwanted or forced sex". The following states have not yet introduced consent-based legislation:

- Algeria: There is no clear definition of rape in Algerian law; Article 333 of its Penal Code only criminalises "anyone who has committed a public outrage against decency", and in similar words "public outrage against decency consisting of an unnatural act with an individual of the same sex". This gives no indication or distinction whether the people involved in the acts are consenting to it, merely that the public is supposedly outraged by such acts. Article 334 prohibits "(attempted) assault against decency without violence against a person of either sex younger than 16" (the Algerian age of consent), but against adults only "(attempted) assault against decency with violence" (Article 335) is banned. The lack of unambiguous definitions and explicit criminalisation of marital rape in either the Penal Code or other laws such as Law no.15-19 against domestic violence (2015) has been criticised by the CEDAW Committee and human rights organisations, which urged Algeria to adopt clear, consent-based legislation.
- Democratic Republic of the Congo: Although the Law Amending the Penal Code (2006) criminalised "any act contrary to morals intentionally and directly carried out on a person without the valid consent of that person" as "indecent assault" (Article 167), Article 170 states: "Rape is committed by the use or threat of violence or serious harm or force against a person, directly or through an intermediary or through a third party, either by surprise, by psychological pressure or in the context of a coercive environment or by abusing a person who, because of an illness, the impairment of his or her faculties or any other accidental reason has lost the use of his or her faculties or has been deprived of them by tricks". Moreover, the legal definition of rape does not include spousal rape; customary law holds that sex within marriage is consensual by definition.
- Ethiopia: Criminal Code Article 620 states that rape is committed by "whoever compels a woman to submit to sexual intercourse outside wedlock, whether by the use of violence or grave intimidation, or after having rendered her unconscious or incapable of resistance", thus placing responsibility on the victim to resist her attacker until she is overcome by coercion, and exempting marital rape from prosecution.
- Morocco: Article 485 of Morocco's Penal Code (15 September 2011 revision) describes "assault on decency" as a crime that is "committed or attempted with violence against persons of either sex." According to Article 486, "Rape is the act by which a man has sexual relations with a woman against her will." A number of persons deemed to be vulnerable are afforded extra protection by double punishment of the perpetrator (10 to 20 years in prison instead of 5 to 10).
  - The current status of marital rape in Morocco is unclear. Although it is frequently challenged, most authorities appear to state that is legal. In March 2013, the Moroccan Minister of Justice stated that marital rape could not be criminalised: "you can't deprive a man of what is rightfully his." According to the USDOS in 2017, spousal rape was not a crime. The "Hakkaoui Law" (named after Minister for Family Affairs and Women's Issues, Bassima Hakkaoui) criminalised violence against women in September 2018, but failed to address marital rape. However, a May 2022 ruling by the Family Court of Rabat rejected a man's request to compel his wife to have intercourse with him. The court stated that per Article 51 of Morocco's Family Code, sexual intercourse "is a right and duty of both the husband and the wife" and argued that the wife's refusal is a practice of the said right. It further "considered that the aim of sexual intercourse within marriage was not only to satisfy instinctive desires but also to share the etiquette of cohabitation, which must be adhered to by the spouses and followed only by mutual consent."
- Sudan: Some attempts had been made under al-Bashir's rule (1989–2019) to reform legislation on issues such as extramarital rape victim blaming via 'adultery', and impunity for marital rape, by amending the definition of rape in Article 149.1 of the Criminal Code in February 2015. However, several commentators such as the African Centre for Justice and Peace Studies argued that this amendment had a number of flaws. Even though the amendment made it possible to prosecute marital rape by removing the reference to adultery, there is still no specific prohibition of marital rape, and oral rape is not criminalised. Moreover, Article 149.2 still defined adultery and sodomy as forms of 'rape', so complainants still risked being prosecuted for adultery or sodomy if they failed to prove they were subjected to sexual acts without their consent. Finally, the importance of consent was diminished in favour of coercion, going against the trend in international law to define sexual violence by lack of consent. On 22 April 2020, during the Sudanese transition to democracy, the sodomy law was amended: male participants in anal sex (sodomy, whether between two men or between a man and a woman, with or without consent) were no longer punishable by death or flogging, but still punishable by imprisonment.

=== Americas ===
All 35 sovereign states in the Americas (Cuba's status being unclear) are members of the Organization of American States. Excluding Canada, Cuba and the United States, 32 of them have signed and ratified the Belém do Pará Convention, which the Inter-American Court of Human Rights in 2006 ruled to be consent-based, with its follow-up mechanism MESECVI in 2014 declaring the same. The following states have not yet introduced consent-based legislation:

- Argentina: Two laws criminalise rape, including spousal rape; both are coercion-based. Article 2 of Law 25.087 (1999) describes various "crimes against sexual integrity" as "Anyone who sexually abuses a person of either sex when the person is under the age of thirteen or when there is violence, threat, coercive or intimidating abuse of a dependency relationship"; this includes "carnal access by any means". Article 5 of Law 26.485 (Law of Integral Protection of Women, 2009) defines sexual violence as "Any action that implies the violation in all its forms, with or without genital access, of a woman's right to voluntarily decide about her sexual or reproductive life through threats, coercion, use of force or intimidation, including rape within marriage or other related or kinship relationships, whether or not there is coexistence, as well as forced prostitution, exploitation, slavery, harassment, sexual abuse and trafficking in women."
- Bolivia: In 2013 the Bolivian government passed the Law Guaranteeing Women a Life Free from Violence (Spanish: Ley Integral Para Garantizar A Las Mujeres Una Vida Libre De Violencia). Its provisions included the repeal of the marital rape exemption in the Penal Code, and making rape by a spouse an aggravating factor when sentencing, extending imprisonment by 5 years. Despite the introduction of words such as 'consent' and 'non-consensual', Bolivian criminal law remained coercion-based. "Rape" (violación) could, according to Article 308, be committed in two ways: "by means of intimidation, physical or psychological violence, [performing] non-consensual sexual acts involving carnal access with a person of either sex, by means of penetration..." ('intimidation/violence' thus being a constituent element of 'non-consensual sexual acts'), or "under the same circumstances, even if there is no physical violence or intimidation, taking advantage of the victim's serious mental illness or lack of intelligence, or who is otherwise incapable of resisting" (resistance or capacity to resist thus being required or expected in all other cases). Article 312 bis "Abusive sexual acts" is a notable provision stating that "the person who, during consensual sexual intercourse, forces his partner or spouse to endure acts of physical violence and humiliation", can be punished with imprisonment for 4 to 6 years.
- Brazil: In the Penal Code of Brazil, Article 213 (2009 revision) defines "rape" (estrupo) as "compelling someone, through violence or serious threat, to having carnal conjunction or to practicing or allowing another libidinous act". In the 2001 case Prosecutor v. Kunarac, the ICTY cited Article 213 as an example of a law "requiring violence, force or a threat of force" to meet the definition of 'rape'. In the context of domestic and family violence against women, Article 7(III) of the Lei Maria da Penha (Law 11.340 of 2006) defines "sexual violence" (violência sexual) as "any conduct that forces her to witness, maintain or participate in unwanted sexual intercourse, through intimidation, threat, coercion or force (...)." Article 215 (2009 revision) of the Code criminalises 'carnal conjunction' (conjunção carnal) by "fraud or other means that prevent or hinder the victim's free expression of will", and thus defines scenarios in which the law deems people incapable of consenting. However, there is no stipulation that a lack of freely given consent during 'carnal conjunction' constitutes rape. On the other hand, Article 215A (introduced by Law 13.718 in 2018) does criminalise sexual harassment (assédio sexual) on the basis of a lack of consent (sem a sua anuência). Similarly, selling or distributing "scenes of sex, nudity or pornography without the consent of the victim" (sem o consentimento da vítima, cena de sexo, nudez ou pornografia) is criminalised by Article 218C (also introduced by Law 13.718 in 2018). Since 2005, the law criminalises rape of men or women, including spousal rape (Articles 213 & 226).
- Chile: In the Chilean Penal Code (24 August 2022 revision), Articles 361–372 address sexual violence from a coercion perspective. "Rape" (violación) is defined as "A person [having] carnal access, vaginally, anally or buccally, to a person over fourteen years of age, in any of the following cases: (1) When force or intimidation is used, (2) When the victim is deprived of consciousness, or when their incapacity to oppose is taken advantage of, or (3) When the alienation or mental disorder of the victim is abused." The only mention of 'consent' (consentimiento) is in Article 366, which mentions "the use of surprise" as an example of an "[abusive] manoeuvre that does not imply the consent of the victim", and by which the perpetrator can "abusively [perform] a sexual action other than carnal access with a person over fourteen years of age". In short, unless the perpetrator uses force or intimidation, or an abusive manoeuvre to undermine the other person's opposition, or takes advantage of the other person's pre-existing incapacity to oppose the sexual violence, the consent of every person aged at least 14 is presumed. Marital rape is criminalised in Article 369.
- Colombia: Articles 205 to 212A criminalise various sexual acts (including spousal rape, 211(5)) on the basis of violence. 210A and 212A do mention consent, but only in the context of the incapacity to consent to sexual acts due to being overpowered by "superiority or authority" (210A) or "fear of violence, intimidation; illegal detention; psychological oppression; the abuse of power; the use of environments of coercion and similar circumstances that prevent the victim from giving their free consent" (212A).
- Ecuador: The 2014 Penal Code states in Article 175(5): "In sexual crimes, the consent given by the victim under eighteen years of age is irrelevant." However, 'consent' is not mentioned in any of the provisions in Articles 166–175 related to sexual crimes against victims aged 18 and older either. Only Article 170 "Sexual abuse" (which is done "against the will of another") and Article 171 "Rape" (Violación) can be committed against people aged 18 or older. Rape is committed in three scenarios: (1) "When the victim is deprived of reason or sense, or [unable to] resist", (2) "When violence, threat or intimidation is used.", (3) "When the victim is under fourteen years of age." Curiously, the crime described in Article 172, namely "[using someone] to force them to display their body totally or partially for purposes of a sexual nature", can only be committed against "girls, boys or adolescents, people over sixty-five years of age or people with disabilities", but doing so against able-bodied adults aged 18 to 64 is presumably not punishable.
- Greenland and Faroe Islands: As an autonomous country within the Kingdom of Denmark, Greenland originally had the same Criminal Code as Denmark itself, but since 1954, Greenlandic legislation and jurisprudence have developed autonomously from Denmark. The two most important provisions on rape in Greenland's Criminal Code are Article 77 and Article 216, both of which establish coercion (either by "violence or threat of violence", "unlawful coercion" or inability to resist) as a constituent element of "rape". On 1 January 2021, paragraphs 216 and 228 of the Danish Penal Code were amended with a consent-based rape provision, but these amendments did not apply to Greenland and the Faroe Islands.
- Peru: Freely given consent plays a minor role in Peruvian law about sexual violence. In lesser crimes it plays a central role, such as Article 176 "Touching, acts of sexual connotation or libidinous acts without consent" ("Whoever, without the purpose of having carnal access regulated by article 170, performs on a person, without their free consent, touching, acts of sexual connotation or libidinous acts, in their intimate parts or in any part of their body...") and Article 176-B "Sexual harassment" ("Whoever, in any way, monitors, persecutes, harasses, besieges or seeks to establish contact or closeness with a person, without the consent of the latter, to carry out acts of sexual connotation..."). However, the most severe sex crimes in the Peruvian Penal Code are based on the perpetrator's use of coercion, the victim's inability resist, or the victim's incapacity to consent. Sexual violation (Article 170) is described as "The one that with violence, physical or psychological, serious threat or taking advantage of an environment of coercion or any other environment that prevents the person from giving their free consent, forces the person to have carnal access vaginally, anally or buccally or performs any other analogous act with the introduction of an object or part of the body by any of the first two ways...". Article 171 deals with "Rape of a person in a state of unconsciousness or unable to resist", Article 172 with "Violation of a person incapable of giving their free consent", Article 173 with "Sexual violation of a minor", Article 174 with "Violation of a person under authority or surveillance", and Article 175 with "Sexual violation through deceit".
- Uruguay: Consent plays no role in the Articles 272–277 about "carnal violence" (violencia carnal) in the Penal Code of Uruguay (2000 revision). Article 272 "Rape" (Violación) states: "A person commits rape who compels a person of the same or of the opposite sex, with violence or threats, to suffer carnal union, even if the act is not consummated." This wording implicitly criminalises marital rape. The article goes on to list four types of scenarios in which "violence is presumed" to have taken place. Article 273 states that "Violent indecent assault is committed (...) through the means established in the previous article, or taking advantage of the circumstances set forth therein, [by performing] obscene acts (...) other than carnal union". Article 275 Estupro essentially describes rape by deception through a false promise of marriage to "a female maiden/virgin (mujer doncella) under the age of twenty years and over the age of fifteen years".
- Venezuela: The Penal Code of Venezuela (2005 revision) is almost entirely coercion-based. Article 374 sets out the conditions for rape: "Whoever by means of violence or threats has constrained any person, of one or the other sex, to a carnal act by vaginal, anal or oral route, or introduction of objects by any of the first two routes, or by oral an object that simulates sexual objects is introduced, the person responsible will be punished, as accused of rape, with a prison sentence of ten to fifteen years." It adds four types of scenarios in which "violence or threats" are not necessary, but by definition constitute rape: (1) anyone with someone below the age of 13, (2) a relative abusing their familial ties with someone below the age of 16, (3) a prison guard with a detainee/prisoner, or (4) anyone with someone who is unable to resist due to physical or mental illness, or deception or narcotic/exciting substances used by the perpetrator. The Penal Code only invokes consent in very specific rape by deception cases under Article 378: "The carnal act performed on a woman over sixteen years of age and under twenty-one with her consent, is punishable when there is seduction with a marriage promise and the woman is known to be honest; in such a case, the penalty will be from six months to one year in prison." This provision is similar to another in Article 384 on abduction of "a minor or a married woman" who "has given her consent" (that is, elopement), which is punished with "imprisonment for a term of six months to two years."

=== Asia ===
Asia does not have a continent-wide legal system. ASEAN, comprising 10 Asian states, signed the 2013 Declaration on Violence against Women and Children. The 2016 ASEAN RPA on EVAW recognised several forms of sexual violence based on a lack of consent, and called on all 10 member states to criminalise marital rape; 4 of them had already done so as of February 2016. The following states have coercion-based legislation:

- Afghanistan: The Afghan Penal Code was amended in 2017, containing Article 636 which states: "A person who commits sexual intercourse or inserts body parts or other objects into the victim's vagina or anus by using force, means of threat, or using a victim's physical or mental inability to express consent or lack of consent (Male or Female), or giving anesthetic substances or other mental affecting drugs, is considered as a perpetrator of rape." This appears to criminalise marital rape as well. However, the Shia Personal Status Law, applying to the Shia Muslim minority of approximately 6 million Afghans, exempts spousal rape in Article 132 (2): "It is the duty of the wife to defer to her husband's inclination for sexual enjoyment". (Note: Afghanistan: Shia Personal Status Law (2008))
- China (People's Republic of China): "Article 236. Whoever, by violence, coercion or other means, rapes a woman is to be sentenced to not less than three years and not more than 10 years of fixed-term imprisonment." Chinese law also does not safeguard same-sex couples or victims of marital rape.
  - Macau: In the Penal Code of Macau, the entire "Chapter V: Crimes against sexual freedom and self-determination" (Articles 157 to 173) is based on the presumption that all victims will resist sexual assault: crimes against sexual freedom can thus only be committed or attempted when a suspect uses violence or coercion in order render the victim incapable of resisting, or when the victim is for some reason already incapable of resisting.
- Indonesia: Article 285 of the Indonesian Criminal Code requires "force or threat of force" for sexual intercourse with a woman out of marriage to constitute rape. Similarly, Article 289 criminalises "obscene acts" forced upon any person by any person "using force or threat of force". Although Article 285 includes "out of marriage" in the definition of rape, (Note: Indonesia: Penal Code) marital rape is considered a form of domestic violence under Articles 5, 8, 46, 47 and 53 of the Law Regarding the Elimination of Violence in the Household, 2004. (Note: Indonesia: Law Regarding the Elimination of Violence in the Household (2004)) A sexual violence bill that was put on hold in the Indonesian Parliament in 2016, was revisited in 2021 when Muslim organisations managed to convince lawmakers to drop the consent-based definition of sexual violence in the bill, as well as key provisions for victims' rights; the watered-down bill was then blocked by Islamist parties who insisted on banning sex outside of marriage, including LGBTQ relations.
- Iran: Penal Code Article 221 considers sex within marriage consensual by definition, and all sex outside marriage to be zina (a type of crime) by definition. Article 224 (d) is understood to refer to rape outside marriage, which is defined as "zina committed by coercion or force". (Note: Iran: Penal Code {2012})
- Kazakhstan: Articles 120–123 of the 2014 Criminal Code of Kazakhstan, as amended on 19 April 2019, are all coercion-based. Rape (Article 120) is defined as "sexual connection using violence or with threat of its application to the victim or to other persons or with use of helpless condition of the victim", other sexual acts (Article 121) have the same force-based conditions, Article 123 adds "blackmail, threat of destruction, damage or withdrawal of property or with use of material or other dependence of the victim", and Article 122 adds being below the age of 16.
- Philippines: Both the Anti-Rape Law of 1997 and the Anti-Violence Against Women and Their Children Act of 2004 criminalise rape, including marital rape, on the basis of coercion. (Note: Philippines: Anti-rape law (1997)) (Note: Philippines: Anti- Violence Against Women and Their Children Act (2004))
- Russia: Criminal Code of Russia Article 131 states: "Rape, that is, sexual intercourse with the use of violence or with the threat of its use against the victim or other persons, or with the use of the helpless state of the victim." (Note: Russia: Russia (1996, amended to 2018) (in Russian))
- Taiwan (Republic of China): Taiwanese law on sexual offences is generally coercion-based, with Article 221 of the Criminal Code stipulating: 'A person who by threats, violence, intimidation, inducing hypnosis, or other means against the will of a male or female and who has sexual intercourse with such person (...).' Consent does play a role in defining offences against privacy, namely in the production and distribution of sexual images in Article 319-1 ('A person who takes photos, videos, electromagnetic records, or use other technological means to record sexual images of the victims without consent (...)') and Article 319-3 ('A person who reproduces, distributes, broadcasts, delivers, displays publicly, or uses other means to allow others to view sexual images without the consent of victims (...)') These consent-based provisions stand in contrast to the coercion-based Article 319-2 in between: 'A person who records sexual images by means of violence, coercion, intimidation or other means against the will of the victims by taking photos, videos, electromagnetic records or other technological methods or make the victims record such images by themselves (...).'
- Thailand: Penal Code Amendment Act (No. 19) 2007 criminalised spousal rape in Section 3 (276), which describes rape as "Anyone who forcibly performs sexual intercourse with another by threatening the latter in whatever manner, by exercising forcible violence, by taking advantage of the latter being in a state of irresistibility, or by causing the latter to mistake him for a different person". (Note: Thailand: Penal Code Amendment Act (No. 19) (2007))

==== Japan ====
The Penal Code of Japan was revised in June 2023 to define many scenarios and circumstances in Article 176 (including but not limited to coercion used by the suspect) that may render a person incapable of consenting to various sexual acts described in Article 177 ("Nonconsensual sexual intercourse etc."). There is no freely given or affirmative consent. Before June 2023, Article 177 described "forcible sexual intercourse" as "A person who, through assault or intimidation forcibly engages in vaginal intercourse, anal intercourse or oral intercourse (...) with another person". Article 178 further implied that victims of sexual assault were required to resist their attackers.

However, even if the composition requirements have changed and have been broadened than before, it does not change that it's not guilty without evidence. So there are voices calling for the expansion of victim support is required, such as strengthening the evidence preservation system of test kits to leave objective evidence, medical institutions that can collect evidence 24 hours a day, and one-stop support centres.

In addition, since the burden of proof is not different from that of the prosecution. So there are voices calling for a polite and careful investigation to visualise the crackdown to prevent false accusations, the right to join lawyers, and shorten the arrest period.

Japanese lawyers expressed concern that the eight newly prepared articles are a mixture of clear requirements and ambiguous requirements, adding that "the subject of punishment has virtually widened and could be framed".

==== South Korea ====
Article 297 (Rape) of South Korea's Penal Code states: "A person who, through violence or intimidation, has sexual intercourse with a female". Article 298 (Indecent Act by Compulsion) states: "A person who, through violence or intimidation, commits an indecent act on another". Article 299 (Quasi-Rape, Quasi-Indecent Act by Compulsion) states: "A person who has sexual intercourse with a female or commits an indecent act on another by taking advantage of the other's condition of unconsciousness or inability to resist", implying that in other circumstances a victim should resist a sexual assault until overcome by the perpetrator's superior force. For this reason, criticism has been raised that it's difficult to punish forced sexual activity without consent. Although Supreme Court of Korea has moved closer to consent-based with the precedent that looks more broadly at the definition of "assault or intimidation", some lower court judges continue to rule against that precedent.

The Supreme Court of Korea ruled that marital rape (described as "forced sex with a spouse") was illegal in 2013.

In 2025, the petitions was filed on the petition site operated by the National Assembly, requesting that the elements of the crime of rape under the Criminal Act be changed from "assault or intimidation" to "consent" – so called "Non-consensual adultery(비동의간음죄, Bidong-ui Ganeumjoe)". The number of consenters, which is the requirement, has exceeded 50,000.

However, as there are petitions and public opinions in favor, there are just as many petitions and public opinions opposing this. There is criticism that in South Korea, sexual crimes are investigated and tried based on the presumption of guilt, ignoring the principle of presumption of innocence. They say that "false accusations of sexual crimes are also being raised as a serious problem". Therefore, they are raising concerns that if the scope of the elements of rape under criminal act is expanded, false accusations of rape will become easier. There is a great concern that this will eventually develop into a gender conflict among South Korean society.

=== Europe ===
Most sovereign states in Europe are members of the Council of Europe (except for Belarus; the disputed Vatican City; and the transcontinental states of Russia and Kazakhstan, see Asia) and have signed the Istanbul Convention (except Azerbaijan), and, once ratified, have the legal obligation to adopt consent-based legislation. The following states have yet to do so:

- Albania: Section 6 of the Criminal Code of the Republic of Albania is devoted to sexual crimes. Of all Articles 100 to 108a, only 102 mentions consent in passing: "Engagement in sexual activity by use of force with adult females or between spouses or cohabitants, without the consent of either of them, shall be punishable by three to ten years imprisonment." GREVIO's November 2017 report interpreted this to mean: "The use of force is a constituent element of the crime of rape with an adult women defined in Article 102, except in cases of rape between spouses or cohabitants where the offence is based on the absence of consent. The possibility of freely given consent is precluded, without the requirement of the use of force, only in cases of exploitation of physically or mentally disabled persons, intimidation with the use of a weapon or abuse of a position of authority or trust. (...) Albania's provision on rape is thus a force-based definition and falls short of the [Istanbul] Convention's requirements."
- Andorra: The 2005 Penal Code of Andorra only employs the term "consent" (French: consentement) only once in relation to sexual offences in Articles 144–146 ("Sexual aggression" against adults) and Articles 147–149 ("Sexual abuse" against people deemed incapable of consenting) is in title of Article 147: "Sexual abuse without consent". According to GREVIO's November 2020 report, this means three categories of people are deemed incapable of consenting: "(1) persons who are unconscious, deprived of their senses or incapable of resisting, (2) people who are incapacitated and taken advantage of by the perpetrator, and (3) people below the age of 14". Article 144 describes "sexual aggression" as follows: "The one who, by means of violence or intimidation, determines a person to take part in a sexual behavior or relationship shall be punished by imprisonment of three months to three years in prison. The attempt is punishable." This meant that Andorrese law did not recognise freely given consent, and assumed that anyone who cannot demonstrate to have been incapacitated or subordinated in any of the stipulated conditions, had the capacity to resist, was required to resist, and must demonstrate to have resisted the (attempted) sexual aggression in order to prove that a crime took place. Andorra thus did not comply to the Istanbul Convention. GREVIO therefore "strongly encourage[d] the Andorran authorities to amend the Criminal Code to guarantee the existence of an offence of sexual violence which is firmly anchored in the absence of consent, regardless of whether the victim is a sane, adult person neither incapacitated nor in a subordinated situation".
- Armenia: Article 138 of the Criminal Code of Armenia defines "rape" as "sexual intercourse of a man with a woman against her will, using violence against the latter or some other person, with threat thereof, or taking advantage of the woman's helpless situation". Article 139 defines "violent acts of sexual nature" as "Homosexual, lesbian or other sexual actions against the aggrieved, by using force against the latter or other persons, or threat of using force, or by taking advantage of the aggrieved person's helplessness".
- Azerbaijan: Article 149 of the Criminal Code of Azerbaijan defines "rape" as "the sexual relations with application of violence or with threat of its application to the victim either to other persons, or with use of a helpless condition of the victim".
- Belarus: Chapter 20 of the Criminal Code of Belarus (13 May 2022 revision), covering Articles 166–171, criminalises various sexual acts in combination with coercion ("against the will of the victim with the use of violence or the threat of its use, or using the helpless state of the victim", or "by means of blackmail, threat of destruction, damage or seizure of property, or using official, material or other dependence of the victim"), or in combination with the other person's age being below 16. Under Article 115 of the 1994 criminal code, rape was defined as "sexual intercourse with the use of physical violence, threat or the use of a helpless state of the sufferer".
- Bosnia and Herzegovina: The 2010 Criminal Code of Bosnia and Herzegovina only mentions rape and sexual violence in the context of armed conflicts, namely in Article 172 "Crimes against Humanity", being "a widespread or systematic attack directed against any civilian population" (Article 172(1)g: "Coercing another by force or by threat of immediate attack upon his life or limb, or the life or limb of a person close to him, to sexual intercourse or an equivalent sexual act (rape), sexual slavery, enforced prostitution, forced pregnancy, enforced sterilisation or any other form of sexual violence of comparable gravity") and Article 173 "War Crimes against Civilians" (Article 173(1)e: "Coercing another by force or by threat of immediate attack upon his life or limb, or the life or limb of a person close to him, to sexual intercourse or an equivalent sexual act (rape) or forcible prostitution...").
  - Federation of Bosnia and Herzegovina: In the August 2003 Criminal Code of the Federation of Bosnia and Herzegovina, Article 203 "Rape" states: "Whoever coerces another by force or by threat of immediate attack upon his life or limb, or the life or limb of someone close to that person, to sexual intercourse or an equivalent sexual act, shall be punished by imprisonment for a term between one and ten years." Article 204 "Sexual Intercourse with a Helpless Person" is defined by "taking advantage of that person's mental illness, temporary mental disorder, infirmity or any other state of that person which makes him incapable of resisting", Article 205 adds "sexual intercourse by abuse of position", and Article 206 adds "forced sexual intercourse by serious threat of serious harm".
  - Republika Srpska: Article 165 "Rape": "Whoever coerces another person into a sexual intercourse or any other equivalent sexual act by force or threat of immediate attack upon life or limb, or the life or limb of someone close to that person, shall be punished by imprisonment for a term between three and ten years." Articles 166–168 add blackmail, helpless state and abuse of position as other means of sexual coercion.
- Czech Republic: In December 2023, the Czech government published a bill proposing to reform legislation towards a "no means no" coercion-based approach, with expanded provisions of scenarios in which the other person is automatically considered legally incapable of consenting, and recognising additional means of indicating non-consent or resistance, but not freely given or affirmative consent. Parliament still had to take the government's proposal in consideration, and possibly submit amendments. Klára Kocmanová, MP for the Czech Pirate Party which originally advocated an "only yes means yes" approach, commented: 'A definition based on lack of consent would be a simpler solution because we would not have to list situations in the definition of defencelessness. However, the proposal approved by the government today, a definition based on lack of consent with a well-defined defencelessness, is an acceptable compromise that has cross-party support and, above all, will improve the situation for victims.'
- France: On 15 April 2021, the National Assembly adopted a statutory rape law that set the legal age of consent at 15, below which all persons are deemed incapable of consenting to sex. However, in the case of adult victims (15 years and older), violence, coercion, threat or surprise still needs to be proven for a rape conviction.
- Georgia (country): Articles 137–141 of the Criminal Code of Georgia, as amended on 22 December 2016, are all coercion-based. "Rape" (Article 137) is defined as "a sexual intercourse by use of violence, threat of violence or abusing the victim's helpless condition", other sexual acts (Article 138) have the same force-based conditions, Article 139 adds "threatening to spread the defamatory information or to damage property, or by using material, official or other kind of dependence", and Articles 140 and 141 add being below the age of 16.
- Liechtenstein: Article 200 "Rape" of the Liechtenstein Criminal Code (1 January 2021 revision) states: "Whoever coerces a person by force, by deprivation of personal liberty or by threatening imminent danger to life or limb (section 89) to perform or tolerate intercourse or a sexual act equivalent to intercourse shall be punished with imprisonment from one to ten years."
- Moldova: Until 9 January 2023, Article 171 of the Moldovan Criminal Code, titled "rape", criminalised 'sexual intercourse committed by physical or mental coercion of the person or taking advantage of the person's inability to defend herself/himself or express her/his will'. On 17 November 2022, amendments were introduced (enacted on 9 January 2023) which retitled Article 171 to "non-consensual sexual acts", and added a definition in new Article 132 stipulating that a 'sexual act or action of a sexual nature that is accompanied by physical or mental coercion, applied to the victim or another person, or in which the person's inability to defend themselves or to express their will is taken advantage of, is considered non-consensual.' GREVIO commented in November 2023: 'While GREVIO welcomes the introduction of the concept of consent into the Moldovan Criminal Code via the recent legislative changes, it regrets to note that the law still defines non-consent on the basis of the use of physical or mental coercion by the perpetrator. The offences of rape and sexual actions without consent, as provided for by Articles 171 and 172 of the Criminal Code, are therefore not based on the notion of lack of freely given consent, as required by Article 36 of the [Istanbul] convention.'
- Monaco: The Criminal Code of Monaco explicitly criminalises marital rape, but not raping one's former spouse, nor other forms of sexual violence regardless of present or past relationship between victim and perpetrator. Monegasque law does not recognise freely given consent. It characterises "rape" "by the use of violence, coercion, intimidation or surprise, while indecent assault perpetrated or attempted against an adult requires use of violence".
- North Macedonia: The Criminal Code of [North] Macedonia of 16 November 2017, Article 186 "Rape", states: "Whosoever, by the use of force or threat to directly attack upon the life or body of another or upon the life or body of someone close to that person, forces him to intercourse, shall be sentenced to imprisonment of three to ten years." Articles 187–189 define "sexual assault" by abusing someone's helplessness, abusing one's own position, or the other person being under 14 years of age, as other means of sexual coercion.
- San Marino: Articles 171–173 of the San Marinese Criminal Code describe sexual violence in terms of "forcing or deceiving a person into committing sexual acts by using violence, threats or suggestion, including hypnotic suggestion". Penetration, the existence of marriage, cohabitation or an emotional relationship between victim and perpetrator, the victim having disabilities, or the perpetrator abusing their position over the victim, all count as aggravating circumstances. People below the age of 14 are deemed incapable of consenting, but a lack of freely given consent for adult people deemed capable of consenting plays no role in San Marinese law.
- Serbia: "Rape (Raping) is defined in Article 178 by the use of force or threat of direct attack against the body of another person and punished with imprisonment from two to ten years."
- (statehood disputed) Vatican City / Holy See: Canon 1395 §3. provides a coercion-based definition of sexual violence, see below.

==== European countries with consent-based amendments pending ====
These European countries currently have coercion-based legislation, but have ratified the Istanbul Convention, which obligates them to introduce a consent-based definition of sexual violence. Therefore, both the legislative and executive branches of government in these countries have been making efforts to draft legislation that complies with the Convention.

- Norway (opposition proposals since March 2018)
- Portugal (government intention since 2018). The January 2019 GREVIO report judged the 2015 amendment of Article 163 and 164 of the Portuguese Criminal Code to be insufficient to comply to the Istanbul Convention.
- Switzerland. As of 2022, the Swiss Criminal Code does not recognise a lack of freely given consent as relevant; it only provides for scenarios in which a person is coerced into having sex (Articles 189, 190), incapable of judgement or resistance to sex (Articles 189–191), or in a dependent relationship to the perpetrator (Articles 192, 193). The Istanbul Convention went into effect in Switzerland in 2018, but despite some reforms, rape is still defined by coercion, threats and exerting psychological pressure as of January 2021. It carries a prison sentence of one to ten years. Abusing a state of defenselessness, for example intoxication, is subsumed under defilement, which carries a prison sentence of up to ten years. Due to pressure from NGOs such as Amnesty, feminist and women's rights groups, the Federal Department of Justice and Police has been examining the need for further reform.

== Legislation in the United States ==
The United States do not have a uniform legal definition of sexual violence, as states may define this differently, but on the federal level the FBI's Uniform Crime Report (UCR) amended its definition of rape on 1 January 2013 from the coercion-based "carnal knowledge of a female forcibly and against her will" to the consent-based "Penetration, no matter how slight, of the vagina or anus with any body part or object, or oral penetration by a sex organ of another person, without the consent of the victim", removing the requirements of force, the victim to be female, and the penetration to be vaginal. Some U.S. states (or other jurisdictions such as American Samoa) recognise penetrative sex without consent by the victim and without the use of force by the perpetrator as a crime (usually called 'rape'). Other states do not recognise this as a crime; their laws stipulate that the perpetrator must have used some kind of force (physical violence (that results in demonstrable physical injury), threats against the victim or a third party, or some other form of coercion) in order for such nonconsensual penetrative sex to amount to a crime. Similarly, some states (or other jurisdictions such as the Military) recognise non-penetrative sex acts (contact such as fondling or touching a person's intimate parts, or exposure of a body or sexual activity) without consent by the victim and without the use of force by the perpetrator as a crime, while other states do not. In 2024, the United States federal Department of Health and Human Services banned hospitals from performing non-consensual breast, pelvic, prostate, and rectal exams for "educational and training purposes" by medical students, nurse practitioners, or physician assistants.

=== U.S. states ===
Coercion-based law (all penetrative sex) Consent-based law (anal and oral sex) Consent-based law (vaginal, anal and oral sex) Mixed legislation; coerced sexual penetration treated as a separate, more severe crime

Coercion-based law (non-penetrative sex) Consent-based law (non-penetrative sex)

State laws have given various definitions of what constitutes sexual consent, and which role it plays in determining whether an offence has been committed.

- Arizona: The Arizona Revised Statutes state in §13-1406: "A person commits sexual assault by intentionally or knowingly engaging in sexual intercourse or oral sexual contact with any person without consent of such person." However, §13-1401 limits the definition of the phrase "without consent" to scenarios in which the victim is "coerced by the immediate use or threatened use of force" (a), incapable of consenting for various reasons (b), or "intentionally deceived" about the act or the perpetrator's identity (c, d). Therefore, there is no freely given or affirmative consent under Arizonan law.
- California: Since January 1, 2019, Section 261.6 of the California Penal Code defines "consent" as "positive cooperation in act or attitude pursuant to an exercise of free will. The person must act freely and voluntarily and have knowledge of the nature of the act or transaction involved." Sections 261.6 and 261.7 stipulate that, wherever "consent is at issue" under Section 261, 262, 286, 287, or 289, or former Section 288a, "a current or previous dating or marital relationship shall not be sufficient to constitute consent", neither is "evidence that the victim suggested, requested, or otherwise communicated to the defendant that the defendant use a condom or other birth control device". Although this definition requires "freely given consent" or "affirmative consent", this requirement is either not mentioned or has only limited application in Sections 261, 262, 265, 266a, and 266b.
- Florida: Section 794.011 of the Florida Statutes defines "consent" as "intelligent, knowing, and voluntary consent and does not include coerced submission. 'Consent' shall not be deemed or construed to mean the failure by the alleged victim to offer physical resistance to the offender." Any sexual act performed on a person without their freely given or affirmative consent is punishable as 'sexual battery' to various degrees (depending on the perpetrator's and victim's ages, and whether no, some, or potentially deadly physical force or coercion was used).
- Georgia: The Georgia Code does not define consent, but under '§ 16-6-22.1. Sexual Battery', "[a] person commits the offense of sexual battery when he or she intentionally makes physical contact with the intimate parts of the body of another person without the consent of that person." The act of intentionally putting "intimate parts" in contact with another person's mouth without that person's consent is indirectly criminalised by '§ 16-6-2.a Sodomy', which prohibits "any sexual act involving the sex organs of one person and the mouth or anus of another"; Powell v. State (1998) and Lawrence v. Texas (2003) determined that these acts were only illegal if one of the participants did not consent. Under '§ 16-6-1. Rape', "rape" is treated as a separate crime, namely "any penetration of the female sex organ by the male sex organ" (also called "carnal knowledge") against "a female forcibly and against her will; or a female who is less than ten years of age". The punishment for this coercion-based crime is more severe than for 'sexual battery', and consent does not play a role under § 16-6-1.
- Illinois: According to the 2012 Criminal Code of the Illinois Compiled Statutes, Section 720 ILCS 5/11-1.70, "consent" is "a freely given agreement to the act of sexual penetration or sexual conduct in question. Lack of verbal or physical resistance or submission by the victim resulting from the use of force or threat of force by the accused shall not constitute consent. The manner of dress of the victim at the time of the offense shall not constitute consent. A person who initially consents to sexual penetration or sexual conduct is not deemed to have consented to any sexual penetration or sexual conduct that occurs after he or she withdraws consent during the course of that sexual penetration or sexual conduct." However, the lack of consent is not sufficient to prosecute anyone for a sex crime (except in very specific cases in which the victim is deemed incapable of consenting, namely Section 11–1.20 (a)(2), Section 11–1.50.(a)(2), Section 11–9.2.(e), and Section 11–9.5.(c)), making Illinois' rape legislation coercion-based (Section 11–1.20 (a)(1)).
- Indiana: The Indiana Code does not define consent (§35-31.5-2). Consent only comes up in situations where the other person is deemed incapable of consenting (§35-42-4-1 to 14); there is no freely given or affirmative consent.
- Massachusetts: The General Laws of Massachusetts do not specifically define consent, and there is no freely given or affirmative consent. Rape can only be committed by having "(unnatural) sexual intercourse with a person" through "compulsion" plus "force and against his will", "threat of bodily injury", "resulting in serious bodily injury", etc.
- Michigan: The Michigan Penal Code does not define consent (§ 750.520a). Consent only comes up in situations where the other person is deemed incapable of consenting (§ 750.520b–e.); there is no freely given or affirmative consent. 'Sodomy' (also called "the abominable and detestable crime against nature") without the other person's consent is indirectly criminalised by § 750.158; Lawrence v. Texas (2003) determined that such an act was only illegal if one of the participants did not consent.
- New Jersey: The New Jersey Code of Criminal Justice only gives a general description of consent, and cases in which a person is incapable of (effectively) consenting in § 2C:2-10. However, State v. Cuni (1999) determined that a defendant must demonstrate the presence of "affirmative and freely-given permission..." on the part of a putative victim of sexual assault. Under '§ 2C:14-2 Sexual assault', 'sexual assault' or 'aggravated sexual assault' occurs (depending on whether "severe personal injury is sustained by the victim") whenever "[t]he actor commits the act [of sexual penetration of another person] using coercion or without the victim's affirmative and freely-given permission" (a.(6) and c.(1)). The same applies to (aggravated) criminal sexual contact (§ 2C:14-3).
- New York: In the New York Penal Law, sexual offenses are defined as "sexual [acts] committed without consent of the victim". Lack of consent results from 4 possible causes: forcible compulsion, incapacity to consent, the victim not expressly or impliedly acquiesceing (in sexual abuse and forcible touching cases), or expression of lack of consent (in sexual intercourse and sexual oral or anal conduct cases). Consent itself is not defined; Section 130.5 only stipulates that a person who does not want to have sex needs to be clear enough in their words and acts, so that "a reasonable person in the actor's situation would have understood such person's words and acts as an expression of lack of consent to such act under all the circumstances". This description does not make clear whether affirmative consent is required to have sex (or conversely, whether a lack of affirmative consent can result in a sexual offense), but both 'Section 130.25 Rape in the third degree (3)' and 'Section 130.40 Criminal sexual act in the third degree (3)' do provide this possibility in the form of catch-all clauses by stating that, whenever there is a "lack of consent (...) by reason of some factor other than incapacity to consent", this is sufficient for the sexual act to amount to a crime.
- North Carolina: The North Carolina General Statutes do not define consent; § 14-27.20 only states that the phrase "against the will of the other person" means either "without consent of the other person" or "after consent is revoked by the other person, in a manner that would cause a reasonable person to believe consent is revoked". The phrase "against the will of the other person" is however always used in conjunction with "by force" ("by force and against the will of the other person"), and otherwise consent only comes up in situations where the other person is deemed incapable of consenting. Thus, there is no situation in which freely given or affirmative consent matters (§ 14-27.21–36).
- Ohio: The Ohio Revised Code does not define consent (§ 2907.01). Consent only comes up in situations where the other person is deemed incapable of consenting (§ 2907.02–41); there is no freely given or affirmative consent.
- Pennsylvania: In the Pennsylvania Consolidated Statutes, 'Section 3107. Resistance not required' stipulates that "the alleged victim need not resist the actor in prosecutions under this chapter". The Statutes do not define consent, but if an actor engages in sexual intercourse or deviate sexual intercourse, or aggravated indecent assault, with a complainant without the latter's consent, this makes the actor punishable under 'Section 3124.1. Sexual assault', or 'Section 3125. Aggravated indecent assault', respectively. Furthermore, mental disability can render a person incapable of consenting to sexual intercourse, deviate sexual intercourse, or aggravated indecent assault, thus making an actor who engages in these acts with a mentally disabled complainant punishable under 'Section 3121. Rape', 'Section 3123. Involuntary deviate sexual intercourse', or 'Section 3125. Aggravated indecent assault', respectively.
- Tennessee: The Tennessee Code does not provide a definition for consent, but a lack of consent is sufficient to commit 'rape' (also called "unlawful sexual penetration") under §39-13-501 or 'sexual battery' (also called "unlawful sexual contact") under §39-13-505, which in identical wording state: "The sexual penetration/contact is accomplished without the consent of the victim and the defendant knows or has reason to know at the time of the contact that the victim did not consent."
- Texas: Consent itself is not defined; the Texas Penal Code only specifies 12 circumstances in which consent is absent, and sexual assault can occur. There is no freely given consent or affirmative consent; Section 22.011 (b) implies that a person's consent is always present, except in the 12 specified circumstances that render a person incapable of consenting, such as being forced or coerced with violence or threats by the actor (possibly because of the unequal power balance between the actor and the other person), unconscious or "physically unable to resist", or having a "mental disease or defect". Texas sexual assault law is therefore coercion-based: the actor requires no freely given consent or affirmative consent from the other person, and the other person cannot freely revoke their implied permanent consent, unless they satisfy one of the 12 specified circumstances. In other words: if the other person claims not to have wanted to have sex with the actor, but cannot be demonstrated to have been incapable of consenting, and the actor cannot be demonstrated to have used some kind of force or coercion, it is not sexual assault under Texas state law.
- Vermont: Act 68, effective since July 1, 2021, redefined sexual consent in 13 V.S.A. § 3251 as "the affirmative, unambiguous, and voluntary agreement to engage in a sexual act, which can be revoked at any time." Reference to compulsion was removed from the definition of sexual assault 13 V.S.A. § 3252, which henceforth stated: "No person shall engage in a sexual act with another person: (1) without the consent of the other person;..." A person is deemed unable to consent if they are unable to understand the nature of the conduct, physically incapable of resisting, declining participation in, or communicating unwillingness to engage in the conduct (e.g. when they are sleeping or unconscious), or lack the mental ability to communicate a decision about whether to engage in the conduct.
- Washington: The Washington Criminal Code §9A.44.010(7) states: ""'Consent' means that at the time of the act of sexual intercourse or sexual contact there are actual words or conduct indicating freely given agreement to have sexual intercourse or sexual contact." Under §9A.44.060, "[a] person is guilty of rape in the third degree when, under circumstances not constituting rape in the first or second degrees, such person engages in sexual intercourse with another person (...) [w]here the victim did not consent as defined in *RCW 9A.44.010(7), to sexual intercourse with the perpetrator...". This is a class C felony, whereas rape in the first and second degree (both of which involve 'forcible compulsion') are class A felonies. However, freely given consent plays no role in non-penetrative sexual acts; under §9A.44.100, "indecent liberties" can only be committed "by forcible compulsion" or against people deemed incapable of consenting.

=== U.S. military ===
2015 U.S. Navy SAPRO video on getting consent in theory and practice

The Uniform Code of Military Justice (UCMJ) of the United States Armed Forces provides a definition of consent and examples of illegitimate inferrals of consent in § 920. Art. 120. "Rape and sexual assault generally" (g) 7 and 8:

(7) Consent.—

(A) The term "consent" means a freely given agreement to the conduct at issue by a competent person. An expression of lack of consent through words or conduct means there is no consent. Lack of verbal or physical resistance does not constitute consent. Submission resulting from the use of force, threat of force, or placing another person in fear also does not constitute consent. A current or previous dating or social or sexual relationship by itself or the manner of dress of the person involved with the accused in the conduct at issue does not constitute consent.
(B) A sleeping, unconscious, or incompetent person cannot consent. A person cannot consent to force causing or likely to cause death or grievous bodily harm or to being rendered unconscious. A person cannot consent while under threat or in fear or under the circumstances described in subparagraph (B) or (C) of subsection (b)(1).
(C) All the surrounding circumstances are to be considered in determining whether a person gave consent.

(8) Incapable of consenting. —The term "incapable of consenting" means the person is—

(A) incapable of appraising the nature of the conduct at issue; or
(B) physically incapable of declining participation in, or communicating unwillingess to engage in, the sexual act at issue.

== Canon law of the Catholic Church ==
The Catholic Church, governed by the Holy See in Vatican City, updated Book VI of its 1983 Code of Canon Law in June 2021 (taking effect on 8 December 2021) for clearer rules on numerous offences, including sexual ones. The revision was the result of a long process commenced in 2009 to better prevent and address Catholic Church sexual abuse cases, mostly committed by clerics against underage children entrusted in their care, but also against vulnerable adults, or other sexual offences the Church regards as sinful due to breaching the clerical celibacy in the Catholic Church. Pope Francis, archbishop Filippo Iannone, and other officials stated that bishops had been too lenient in penalising offenders in the past, in part because of the vagueness of canon law, and formally introduced laicization as a penalty for certain sexual offences.

In Catholic theology, the Ten Commandments are numbered so that the sixth commandment is "Thou shalt not commit adultery". The Catholic Church's interpretation of the sixth commandment is much broader than just adultery (extramarital sex), and concerns a set of so-called "offences against chastity". The revised provisions on sexual offences are derived from this broad interpretation of the sixth commandment. The provisions in Canon 1395 §3. are coercion-based, as they require evidence of the use of "force, threats or abuse of his authority", while Canon 1398 §1. describes sexual offences in which the victim was deemed incapable of consenting (because of "habitually [having] an imperfect use of reason"). There is no freely given sexual consent for people deemed capable of consenting.

Canon 1395 §3. states:

A cleric who by force, threats or abuse of his authority commits an offence against the sixth commandment of the Decalogue or forces someone to perform or submit to sexual acts is to be punished with the same penalty as in § 2 [i.e. punished with just penalties, not excluding dismissal from the clerical state if the case so warrants].

Canon 1398 §1. states:

A cleric is to be punished with deprivation of office and with other just penalties, not excluding, where the case calls for it, dismissal from the clerical state, if he:

1. commits an offence against the sixth commandment of the Decalogue with a minor or with a person who habitually has an imperfect use of reason or with one to whom the law recognises equal protection;
2. grooms or induces a minor or a person who habitually has an imperfect use of reason or one to whom the law recognises equal protection to expose himself or herself pornographically or to take part in pornographic exhibitions, whether real or simulated;
3. immorally acquires, retains, exhibits or distributes, in whatever manner and by whatever technology, pornographic images of minors or of persons who habitually have an imperfect use of reason.

== Effect on conviction rates ==
In June 2020, the Swedish National Council for Crime Prevention (Bra) reported that the number of rape convictions had increased from 190 in 2017 to 333 in 2019, a rise of 75% after Sweden adopted a consent-based definition of rape in May 2018; reports of rape rose by 21% in the same period. Furthermore, the introduction of the new offence of 'negligent rape' – for cases where courts found consent had not been established, but that the perpetrator had not intended to commit rape – led to the conviction of 12 people. Bra was positively surprised by this greater-than-expected impact, saying "this has led to greater justice for victims of rape," and hoping it would improve social attitudes towards sex. Amnesty International regarded the results as evidence that other countries should also adopt consent-based legislation in order to protect (potential) victims of sexual violence better.

Contrary to what some opponents of consent-based legislation have argued, "recent research in countries such as Britain where sex without consent is considered rape, shows that false accusations have not gone up dramatically." Oxford legal professor Jonathan Herring stated in January 2021 that the main remaining problems in the UK are proving "beyond all reasonable doubt" the victim did not consent, and that many juries "still believe in 'rape myths', eg. that the victim who is drunk or in a club is consenting to sex."

== Historical laws ==
Most pre-modern laws were concerned with sexual offences as disturbances of the social order, especially of what a man might do to/with a woman he was not married to, regardless of whether she consented to it. In some rare cases, however, pre-modern laws did consider the (lack of) consent of a person (particularly a woman) involved a relevant factor in determining whether a sexual offence had occurred. Examples include §190 and §191 of the Hittite laws (also known as the 'Code of the Nesilim'; developed c. 1650–1500 BCE, in effect until c. 1100 BCE), and §12 of the Middle Assyrian Laws (developed c. 1450–1250 BCE; this one involves a combination of lack of consent on the one hand, and force on the other).

- Hittite laws §190. "If a man and a woman come willingly, as men and women, and have intercourse, there shall be no punishment. (...)"
- Hittite laws §191. "If a free man picks up now this woman, now that one, now in this country, then in that country, there shall be no punishment if they came together sexually willingly."
- Middle Assyrian Laws §12. "If, as a seignior's wife passed along the street, a(nother) seignior has seized her, saying to her, 'Let me lie with you', since she would not consent (and) kept defending herself, but he has taken her by force (and) lain with her, whether they found him on the seignior's wife or witnesses have charged him that he lay with the woman, they shall put the seignior to death, with no blame attaching to the woman".

== Enforcement challenges ==
While progressive rape legislation is favoured by most legal experts and human rights instruments, as it offers higher protections to rape survivors than coercion-based legislation, there are numerous enforcement challenges related to consent-based rape legislation.

=== Defining consent ===
There are currently consent-based jurisdictions which do not define consent at all within their legislation, which has led to issues such as clothing worn being interpreted as 'consent'. Furthermore, in some legal systems, consent is not solely based on a person's clear agreement but also on the "contribution of the victim", i.e. how their actions, behavior or perceived level of participation or engagement are considered as contributing factors to determining whether consent was given. This approach blurs the distinction between a purely consent-driven system and one that factors in other influences, like coercion. Additionally, some jurisdictions allow for the consideration of the 'reasonable belief' of the offender of consent by the victim, which limits the effectiveness of such legislation.

Furthermore, there is the issue of which concept of 'consent' should be implemented. For example, scientific studies have been strong proponents for a holistically viewed definition which includes contextual cues and interpersonal dynamics. However, this may be too broad for effective enforcement of consent-based legislation due to challenges with legal certainty, a principle which holds that the law must provide those subject to it with the ability to regulate their conduct with certainty. On the other hand, the interpretation of consent in certain legal jurisdictions is too narrow, as it encompasses solely verbal consent.

=== Pervasiveness of rape myths ===
Rape myths are a heavily discussed barrier to effective enforcement of rape legislation in general. However, consent-based legislation is particularly vulnerable to the potential negative consequences that such myths may have on its enforcement. The prevalence of such myths in society poses a challenge for the enforcement of consent-based rape legislation. Firstly, they are a large problem in jury trials; as misperceptions of victim behaviour often lead to assumptions of 'false allegations'. Secondly, such myths and false stereotypes are present in law enforcement as well as in other actors within the criminal justice system. This has numerous negative effects including prejudiced filtering out of rape complaints, deeming 'simple rape' cases as 'unfounded' and promoting the lack of credibility of victims through skewing false allegation statistics. This prejudice within the criminal justice system against the "word of a woman" creates a great barrier to the effective enforcement of rape legislation, but particularly consent-based, as the latter often results in "he-said, she-said" type scenarios.

=== Difficulties with procedural justice for rape survivors ===
Another primary barrier to the effective enforcement of consent-based rape legislation concerns issues with the criminal justice system itself. Rape survivors are often wary of filing a complaint and participating in a trial. Contrary to the stereotype of rape survivors mainly wishing for retributive justice, several surveys have found a desire to protect others as the primary reason for reporting their offenders. Furthermore, many rape survivors face great personal obstacles within a trial setting: often being berated in aggressive cross-examinations, humiliated with inappropriate and irrelevant questions and intimidated by the assailant's friends and families in the courtroom. This dissuades victims from coming forward and filing complaints. Thus, in recent years, there have been attempts to shift more towards focusing on preventative means of reducing rape such as college bystander trainings.

== See also ==
- Circumcision and law
- Female genital mutilation laws by country
- Marital rape laws by country
- Marry-your-rapist law
- Non-consensual condom removal § Legal status (also known as 'stealthing')
- Sodomy law

== Bibliography ==
- "2017 Country Reports on Human Rights Practices". U.S. Department of State. Bureau Of Democracy, Human Rights, And Labor. 20 April 2018.
- Amnesty International (24 November 2018). "Right to be free from rape. Overview of legislation and state of play in Europe and international human rights standards" (PDF). Amnesty International.
- De Vido, Sara (2018). "Women's Rights and Gender Equality in Europe and Asia". Contemporary Issues in Human Rights Law. Europe and Asia (PDF). Singapore: Springer Open. pp. 143–167. ISBN 978-981-10-6129-5. (eBook) doi:10.1007/978-981-10-6129-5
- Koljonen, Camilla (15 July 2019). "How is consent-based legislation on rape providing more protection for individuals in comparison to coercion-based legislation? - Comparison between Finland and Sweden". Maastricht University.
