= Criminal code =

Document that compiles a particular jurisdiction's criminal law

A criminal code or penal code is a document that compiles all, or a significant amount of, a particular jurisdiction's criminal law. Typically a criminal code will contain offences that are recognised in the jurisdiction, penalties that might be imposed for these offences, and some general provisions (such as definitions and prohibitions on retroactive prosecution).

Criminal codes are relatively common in civil law jurisdictions, which tend to build legal systems around codes and principles which are relatively abstract and apply them on a case-by-case basis. Conversely they are not as common in common law jurisdictions. Where a jurisdiction is a federation, the subnational units of such jurisdiction may or may not use separate penal codes. For example, in India, the entire country (the federal government, states, and union territories) all operate under one criminal code, the Bharatiya Nyaya Sanhita, and in Canada the process is roughly the same, with the entire country being subject to a single criminal code. However, in Australia, the federal government and the states operate under different criminal codes (for instance, New South Wales would not necessarily use the federal criminal code, but rather, its own criminal code.)

The proposed introduction of a criminal code in England and Wales was a significant project of the Law Commission from 1968 to 2008. Due to the strong tradition of legal precedent in the jurisdiction and consequently the large number of binding legal judgements and ambiguous 'common law offences', as well as the often inconsistent nature of English law, the creation of a satisfactory code became very difficult. The project was officially abandoned in 2008 although as of 2009 it has been revived.

A statutory Criminal Law Codification Advisory Committee for Irish criminal law met from 2007 to 2010 and its Draft Criminal Code and Commentary was published in 2011.

In the United States, a Model Penal Code exists which is not itself law but which provides the basis for the criminal law of many states. Individual states often choose to make use of criminal codes which are often based, to a varying extent, on the model code. Title 18 of the United States Code is the criminal code for federal crimes. However, Title 18 does not contain many of the general provisions concerning criminal law that are found in the criminal codes of many so-called "civil law" countries.

Criminal codes are generally supported for their introduction of consistency to legal systems and for making the criminal law more accessible to laypeople. A code may help avoid a chilling effect where legislation and case law appears to be either inaccessible or beyond comprehension to non-lawyers. Alternatively critics have argued that codes are too rigid and that they fail to provide enough flexibility for the law to be effective.

Jurisdictions of many countries, such as Algeria, Argentina, Australia, Austria, Brazil, Canada, Chile, China, Denmark, Egypt, Finland, France, Germany, India, Iran, Israel, Italy, Japan, South Korea, Mexico, the Netherlands, Norway, Pakistan, Poland, Russia, Saudi Arabia, South Africa, Spain, Switzerland, Thailand, Turkey, Ukraine, the United Kingdom and the United States, use different penal codes.

== By country ==
- Criminal Code of Algeria
- Penal Code of Argentina
- (Australia) Australian criminal codes
- Criminal Code of Austria
- Criminal Code of Belarus
- Penal Code of Brazil
- British Virgin Islands Criminal Code
- Criminal Code (Canada)
- Criminal Code of Chile
- Criminal Law of the People's Republic of China (zh)
- Criminal Code of the Czech Republic (2009)
- Danish Penal Code (Denmark)
- (Egypt) Egyptian Penal Code
- (England) English Criminal Code, a draft has existed since 1989 but, though debated since 1818, has never been enacted
- Criminal Code of Finland
- (France) French criminal code
- (Georgia (country)) Criminal Code of Georgia
- (Germany) German Criminal Code
- (Hungary) Hungarian Penal Code in English, status of 18 August 2005; Operative Hungarian Penal Code
- General Penal Code (Iceland)
- (India) Bharatiya Nyaya Sanhita (Indian Justice Code)
- (Indonesia) Indonesian Penal Code
- (Israel) Israeli Penal Law
- (Iran) Iranian Criminal Code
- (Iraq) Iraqi Penal Code
- (Italy) Italian Penal Code
- Penal Code of Japan, promulgated on April 24, 1907 while enacted on October 1, 1908.
- Kenya Penal Code
- Penal Code of Macau
- Penal Code (Malaysia), enacted in 1936.
- Maldives Penal Code, enacted in 1968. Revised on 16 July 2015.
- Criminal Code of Malta, enacted in 1854.
- (Mexico) Mexican Penal Code, enacted on August 14, 1931.
- Myanmar Penal Code, enacted on 1 May 1861
- General Code of Nepal
- Penal Code of the Netherlands
- New Zealand Crimes Act 1961
- (Nigeria) Nigerian Criminal Code
- (Norway) Norwegian Criminal Code
- Pakistan Penal Code
- Revised Penal Code of the Philippines
- (Poland) Polish Penal Code
- Penal Code of Portugal
- Penal Code of Romania
- Criminal Code of Russia
- Criminal Code of Saudi Arabia
- Penal Code of South Korea
- Penal Code of Sri Lanka
- Penal Code of Singapore
- (Spain) Spanish Criminal Code, enacted for the first time in 1822. Current version dates back to 1995.
- (Sweden) Swedish Criminal Code
- (Switzerland) Swiss Criminal Code
- (Syria) Syrian Penal Code
- Criminal Code of Thailand
- (Turkey) Turkish Penal Code
- Criminal Code of Ukraine
- Title 18 of the United States Code
- (United States) Model Penal Code by the American Law Institute
- (United States) List of U.S. state statutory codes
- (Vietnam) Vietnamese Penal Code, first enacted in 1985

== See also ==
- Codification
- Civil code
