= Fright =

Fright may refer to:

- Fright (fear), a state of extreme fear
  - Paralysis (sexuality), a state of being paralysed by fear of sexual violence, also known as 'fright' as part of the 'freeze, flight, fight, fright' sequence.
- Fright (comics), a comic book supervillainess
- Fright (film), a 1971 slasher film
- Fright (a.k.a. Spell of the Hypnotist) a 1956 horror film dealing with reincarnation
