= RMAS =

RMAS may refer to:

- Royal Military Academy Sandhurst
- Royal Maritime Auxiliary Service of the United Kingdom
- Remote Memory Administration System an operations support system used in the Bell System
- Rape Myth Acceptance Scale
