= Syrian Penal Code =

Criminal code of Syria

People's Assembly of Syria
- Long title: Penal Code (issued by Legislative Decree No. 148/1949)
- Territorial extent: Syria
- Enacted by: People's Assembly of Syria
- Enacted: 22 June 1949

Amended by
- 30 June 2018
- Status: Current legislation

The Syrian Penal Code (Arabic: قانون العقوبات السوري) is the criminal code of Syria. It was promulgated in 1949 and enacted on 22 June 1949. The criminal code consists of 756 articles.

== Structure ==
=== General Provisions (articles 1-259 of the Criminal Code) ===
Book One:

- Penal Code (articles 1-36 of the Criminal Code)
- In Penal Provisions (articles 37-177 of the Criminal Code)
- In Crime (articles 178-208 of the Criminal Code)
- Responsibility (articles 209-259 of the Criminal Code)

=== Crimes (articles 260-532 of the Criminal Code) ===
Book Two:

- Crimes against state security (articles 260-311 of the Criminal Code)
- Crimes against public safety (articles 312-339 of the Criminal Code)
- Crimes against the public administration (articles 340-387 of the Criminal Code)
- Crimes against the judicial administration (articles 388-426 of the Criminal Code)
- Crimes against public trust (articles 427-461 of the Criminal Code)
- Crimes affecting religion and family (articles 462-488 of the Criminal Code)
- Crimes against morality and public morals (articles 489-532 of the Criminal Code)

=== Trust and Misdemeanors (articles 533-756 of the Criminal Code) ===
Book Three:

- Crimes and misdemeanors that benefit people (articles 533-572 of the Criminal Code)
- Crimes that constitute a comprehensive threat (articles 573-595 of the Criminal Code)
- Crimes committed by people who are dangerous because of their lifestyle (articles 596-620 of the Criminal Code)
- Crimes against money (articles 621-735 of the Criminal Code)
- Coagulants (articles 736-756 of the Criminal Code)

== See also ==
- Judiciary of Syria
- Constitution of Syria
- People's Council of Syria
