= Effects and aftermath of rape =

Rape is a type of sexual assault involving sexual intercourse, or other forms of sexual penetration, carried out against a person without their consent. The act may be carried out through physical force, coercion, or through sex with a person who is incapable of giving valid consent, such as one who is incapacitated, has an intellectual disability, or is below the legal age of consent (statutory rape). There are multiple types of rape that an individual can experience such as acquaintance rape, marital rape, stranger rape, gang rape, drug-facilitate rape, incest rape, and child sexual abuse and assault. When an individual has suffered a traumatic experience like rape, the person can be affected physically, psychologically, and sociologically. The effects of rape and its aftermath differs among the victims.

== Physical impact ==
=== Gynecological ===
Common effects experienced by rape victims include:

- Vaginal or anal bleeding or infection
- Hypoactive sexual desire disorder
- Vaginitis or vaginal inflammation
- Dyspareunia – painful sexual intercourse
- Vaginismus – a condition affecting someone with a vagina and ability to engage in any form of vaginal penetration
- Chronic pelvic pain
- Urinary tract infections
- Pregnancy
- HIV/AIDS

=== Pregnancy ===
5.9 million women or 1 in 20 in the United States experienced pregnancy from rape or sexual coercion in their lifetime. Multiracial women reported higher rates of rape, sexual violence, or sexual coercion compared to Black, White, and Hispanic women. Among victims who experienced pregnancy from rape, 28% reported sexually transmitted infections., 66% of the victims were badly injured, while more than 80% of the victims were afraid for their safety. In 2016/2017 NISVS had reported that 14.9% of vaginal rape victims and 16.6% of sexual coercion victims became pregnant.

=== Sexually transmitted diseases ===
Research on women in shelters has shown that women who experience both sexual and physical abuse from intimate partners are significantly more likely to have had sexually transmitted diseases.

== Psychological impact ==
Most rape survivors experience a stronger psychological impact in the initial period after their assault; however, many survivors may experience long-lasting psychological harm.

=== Immediate effect ===
Survivors of rape may often have anxiety and fear directly following their attack. According to a study on the reactions after rape by the American Journal of Orthopsychiatry, 96 percent of women said they were scared, shaking, or trembling a few hours after their attack. After even more time passed, the previous symptoms decreased while the levels of depression, exhaustion, and restlessness increased.

=== Anxiety ===
After an attack, rape survivors experience heightened anxiety and fear. According to Dean G. Kilpatrick, a distinguished psychologist, survivors of rape have high levels of anxiety and phobia-related anxiety. This includes and is not limited to the following:

- Feelings of dread
- Feeling nervous
- Feeling tense or uneasy
- Having panic attacks
- Having an irrational response to certain stimuli
- Having avoidance and/or escape response.

=== Hypersexuality ===
Some survivors of rape cope by attempting to have a lot of sex, even (or especially) in cases where they did not do this before the rape.

=== Post-traumatic stress disorder ===
Many survivors of rape have post-traumatic stress disorder. The National Victim Center and the Crime Victim's Research and Treatment Center released a report that found 31% of women who were raped develop PTSD at some point in their lives following their attack. The same study estimated 3.8 million American women would have rape-related PTSD, and 1.3 million women have rape-induced PTSD.

=== Depression ===
A study found that women who were raped were more depressed than women who were not. The study measured the level of depression using the Beck Depression Inventory test, and concluded that forty-five percent of the women assessed in the study were moderately or severely depressed.

=== Self-blame ===
Self-blame is among the most common of both short- and long-term effects and functions as an avoidance coping skill that inhibits the healing process and can often be remedied by a cognitive therapy technique known as cognitive restructuring.

There are two main types of self-blame: behavioral self-blame (undeserved blame based on actions) and characterological self-blame (undeserved blame based on character). Survivors who experience behavioral self-blame feel that they should have done something differently, and therefore feel at fault. Survivors who experience characterological self-blame feel there is something inherently wrong with them which has caused them to deserve to be assaulted.

A leading researcher on the psychological causes and effects of shame, June Tangney, lists five ways shame can be destructive:

- lack of motivation to seek care;
- lack of empathy;
- isolation;
- anger;
- aggression.

Tangney notes the link of shame and anger. "In day-to-day life, when people are shamed and angry they tend to be motivated to get back at a person and get revenge."

In addition, shame is connected to psychological problems – such as eating disorders, substance abuse, anxiety, depression, and other mental disorders as well as problematic moral behavior. In one study over several years, shame-prone children were also prone to substance abuse, earlier sexual activity, less safe sexual activity, and involvement with the criminal justice system.

Behavioral self-blame is associated with feelings of guilt within the survivor. While the belief that one had control during the assault (past control) is associated with greater psychological distress, the belief that one has more control during the recovery process (present control) is associated with less distress, less withdrawal, and more cognitive reprocessing. This need for control stems from the just-world belief, which implies that people get what they deserve and the world has a certain order of things that individuals are able to control. This control reassures them that this event will not happen again.

Counseling responses found helpful in reducing self-blame are supportive responses, psychoeducational responses (learning about rape trauma syndrome) and those responses addressing the issue of blame. A helpful type of therapy for self-blame is cognitive restructuring or cognitive-behavioral therapy. Cognitive reprocessing is the process of taking the facts and forming a logical conclusion from them that is less influenced by shame or guilt. Most rape survivors cannot be reassured enough that what happened to them is "not their fault." This helps them fight through shame and feel safe, secure, and grieve in a healthy way. In most cases, a length of time, and often therapy, is necessary to allow the survivor and people close to the survivor to process and heal.

=== Psychological impact on men ===
Male-on-male rape is often considered a taboo topic that society and the criminal justice system tends to neglect and not consider it as important as other categories of rape. Research or data conducted on male-on-male rape is severally lacking, since typically male victims deny their victimization or any type of sexual abuse they could have experienced in their lifetime. John C. Thomas and Jonathan Kopel found that in the United Kingdom and United States, or in any Nordic countries, only about 5-10 percent of male victims had reported their rape or any type of sexual assault each year. There are many cultural stereotypes that is deeply seated in the foundation of our society that doesn't allow males to report their sexual assault victimizations. Socialization of men and toxic masculinity have defined men as the aggressors who are always ready for sex, making it extremely difficult to be considered victims or admitting any type of vulnerability. Men are afraid that no one will believe them or they will be blamed for the crime rather than being seen as victims. Men choose to stay silent about their assault rather than reporting it since it will make them appear less masculine, especially if other men question their sexual orientation. In a study conducted by distinguished scholars, Jayne Walker, John Archer, and Michelle Davies had found that many male survivors had experienced long-term depression, anxiety, anger, confusion about their masculinity and sexuality, and grief. Approximately 95 percent of male survivors wanted revenge on their assailant and had purchased weapons for killing their assailants. Many male survivors felt extremely powerless since they believed they had lost their male pride, dignity, self-respect, and self-worth.

=== Suicide ===
Survivors of rape are more likely to attempt or commit suicide. The association remains, even after controlling for sex, age, education, symptoms of post-traumatic stress disorder and the presence of psychiatric disorders. The experience of being raped can lead to suicidal behavior as early as adolescence. In Ethiopia, 6% of raped schoolgirls reported having attempted suicide. They also feel embarrassed to talk about what had happened to them. A study of adolescents in Brazil found prior sexual abuse to be a leading factor predicting several health risk behaviours, including suicidal thoughts and attempts.

== Sociological impact and mistreatment of victims ==
After a sexual assault, victims are subjected to investigations and, in most cases, mistreatment. Victims undergo medical examinations and are interviewed by police. During the criminal trial, victims suffer a loss of privacy and their credibility may be challenged. Sexual assault victims may also experience secondary victimization and victim blaming including, slut-shaming and cyberbullying. During criminal proceedings, publication bans and rape shield laws operate to protect victims from excessive public scrutiny.

=== Secondary victimization ===
Rape is especially stigmatizing in cultures with strong customs and taboos regarding sex and sexuality. For example, a rape victim (especially one who was previously a virgin) may be viewed by society as being "damaged." Victims in these cultures may suffer isolation, be disowned by friends and family, be prohibited from marrying, be divorced if already married, or even killed. This phenomenon is known as secondary victimization. While society targets secondary victimization mainly towards women, male victims can also feel shameful, or experience a loss of purity.

Secondary victimization is the re-traumatization of the sexual assault, abuse, or rape victim through the responses of individuals and institutions. Types of secondary victimization include victim blaming and inappropriate post-assault behavior or language by medical personnel or other organizations with which the victim has contact. Secondary victimization is especially common in cases of drug-facilitated, acquaintance, and statutory rape.

=== Victim blaming ===
The term victim blaming refers to holding the victim of a crime to be responsible for that crime, either in whole or in part. In the context of rape, it refers to the attitude that certain victim behaviors (such as flirting or wearing sexually provocative clothing) may have encouraged the assault. This can cause the victim to believe the crime was indeed their fault. Rapists are known to use victim blaming as their primary psychological disconnect from their crime(s) and in some cases it has led to their conviction. Female rape victims receive more blame when they exhibit behavior which breaks the gender roles of society. Society uses this behavior as a justification for the rape. Similarly, blame placed on female rape victims often depends on the victim's attractiveness and respectability. While such behavior has no justified correlation to an attack, it can be used in victim blaming. A "rape supportive" society refers to when perpetrators are perceived as justified for raping. Male victims are more often blamed by society for their rape due to weakness or emasculation. The lack of support and community for male rape victims is furthered by the lack of attention given to sexual assaults of males by society.

It has been proposed that one cause of victim blaming is the just world fallacy. People who believe that the world is intrinsically fair may find it difficult or impossible to accept a situation in which a person is badly hurt for no reason. This leads to a sense that victims must have done something to deserve their fate. Another theory entails the psychological need to protect one's own sense of invulnerability, which can inspire people to believe that rape only happens to those who provoke the assault. Believers use this as a way to feel safer: If one avoids the behaviours of the past victims, one will be less vulnerable. A global survey of attitudes toward sexual violence by the Global Forum for Health Research shows that victim-blaming concepts are at least partially accepted in many countries.

An additional idea used to explain victim blaming is the ideal victim theory. Conceptualized by Nils Christie in 1986, the ideal victim theory explains that certain individuals have features that make them seem as more acceptable as a victim. This is not to be confused with the idea of what kind of people are more likely to be victims to criminals. Ideal victim theory establishes that a person's lifestyle deeply impacts the public's perception on whether or not the individual 'deserved' what happened to them. For example, Christie's theory states that an elderly woman who is attacked by a man seeking drugs while walking home from caring for her sick sister is an ideal victim as she has no lifestyle or individual factors that would’ve provoked that attack. However, on the alternative, a young man in a bar who is raped is not an ideal victim, as his choice to drink alcohol and put himself in the situation of possible abuse pushed the public to believe the rape was justified. Ultimately, the theory of an ideal victim is dependent on what type of person will generate the most sympathy from the public.

Victim blame can also be a result of popular media's use of sexual objectification. Sexual objectification is reducing an individual's existence to that of a sexual object. This involves dehumanization. A study conducted in Britain found that women who are objectified based on the clothes that they wear and what the media says about them, the more likely they would be to experience victim-blame after a sexual assault. Another study that investigated a large group of college students to see medias contribution to sexual objectification and its effects on victim-blaming, found that the more a person is exposed to media content that sexualizes women's bodies the more likely they are to participate in rape blame.

It has also been proposed by Roxane Agnew-Davies, a clinical psychologist and an expert on the effects of sexual violence, that victim-blaming correlates with fear. "It is not surprising when so many rape victims blame themselves. Female jurors can look at the woman in the witness stand and decide she has done something 'wrong' such as flirting or having a drink with the defendant. She can therefore reassure herself that rape won't happen to her as long as she does nothing similar."

According to a multitude of studies, heterosexual men are the most likely to participate in victim-blaming. Men tend to blame other men for their own sexual assaults. They also tend to blame individuals who do not adhere to gender norms, such as crossdressers, transgender men, and gay men.

Many of the countries in which victim blaming is more common are those in which there is a significant social divide between the freedoms and status afforded to men and women.

== Reporting a rape ==
Some individuals have found that reporting their assault assisted them in their recovery process. Contacting law enforcement, seeking medical attention, and/or contacting a sexual assault hotline such as the National Sexual Assault Hotline in the USA are several options that survivors may consider while seeking justice.

Even so, only a small percentage of survivors decide to report their rape. Rape victims are less likely to report their sexual assault than simple assault victims. Between 2006 and 2010, it is estimated that 211,200 rapes or sexual assaults were unreported to police each year. Factors that may influence a rape reporting decision include gender, age, minority status, perceived outcomes, and social expectations. Furthermore, a rape in which the survivor knows the perpetrator is less likely to be reported than one committed by a stranger. The absence of physical injuries and involvement of drugs and/or alcohol also contributes to the decrease in reports. Specifically, female rape victims are more likely to report their cases when they feel more victimized due to serious bodily injuries. Female rape victims are less likely to report cases in which the perpetrator is a relative or acquaintance. Male rape victims may be hesitant to report rapes due to the stigma surrounding male rape, which can cause humiliation or fear of emasculation.

Survivors who do not decide to report their rape to law enforcement are still eligible to receive a sexual assault forensic exam, also known as a rape kit. They are also still encouraged to seek support from their loved ones and/or a professional psychologist.

== Recovering from a rape ==
The process of recovering from a rape differentiates among survivors for their own individual reasons. The nature of the attack, how survivors choose to cope with their trauma, and social influences are a few of the many variables that impact the healing process. Even so, recovery generally consists of three main themes: reaching out, reframing the rape, and redefining the self. Professional treatment may be needed to help assist with properly accomplishing these three factors. Cognitive Processing Therapy has been found to result in a decrease or remission of post trauma symptoms in survivors and to help them regain a sense of control. Due to its complexity, advancing through the healing process requires patience and persistence. In addition, meditation, yoga, exercise, rhythmic movement, and socialization may also provide elements of relief for survivors. Furthermore, support groups provide individuals with an opportunity to connect with other survivors and serve as a constant reminder that they are not alone.

== See also ==
- Rape paralysis
- Post-assault treatment of sexual assault victims
- Thordis Elva – Rape victim who later collaborated with her assailant to author a book about the experience
- Marry-your-rapist law
