= Pelvic examinations under anesthesia by medical students without consent =

Medical education controversy

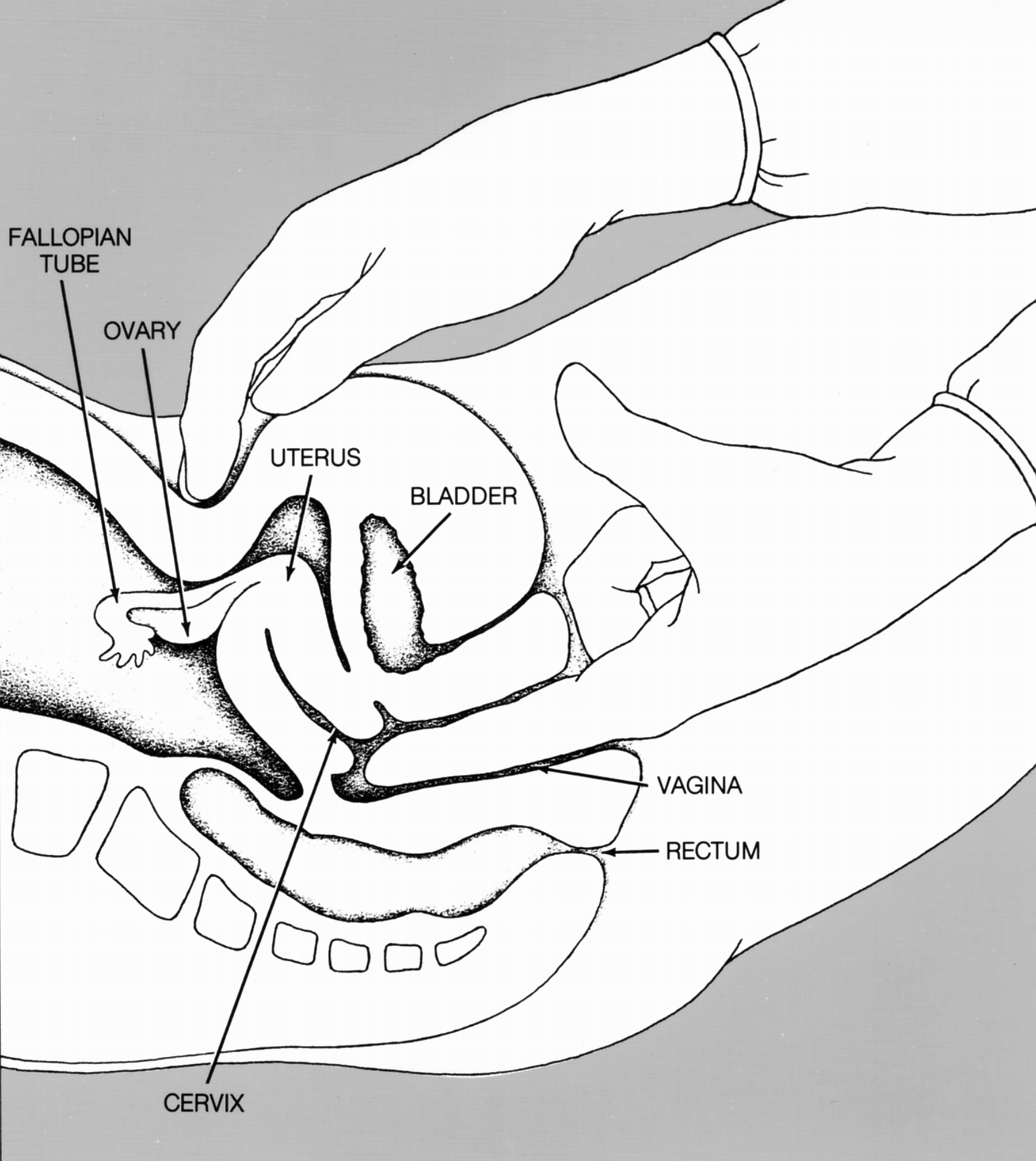
Line drawing showing bimanual palpation as part of a pelvic exam

Pelvic exams under anesthesia by medical students without explicit consent are routinely performed to teach medical students how to conduct pelvic exams. They are typically done during gynecological surgeries, but not exclusively. In 2024, the United States federal Department of Health and Human Services issued guidance to teaching hospitals and medical schools requiring written consent before performing breast, pelvic, prostate, and rectal exams for "educational and training purposes.” Hospitals that do not obtain explicit consent may be ineligible to participate in Medicare and Medicaid programs and may be subject to fines and investigations for violating patient privacy laws.

First-year medical students find such examinations more morally problematic than those who have completed clinical clerkships in obstetrics and gynaecology, an example of a phenomenon known as ethical erosion.

== Frequency ==
A study done in 2003 found that 90% of Pennsylvania medical students had done pelvic exams on anesthetized patients during their gynecology rotation. One medical student described performing them "for 3 weeks, four to five times a day, I was asked to, and did, perform pelvic examinations on anesthetized women, without specific consent, solely for the purpose of my education."

A 2022 study of six American medical schools found that of the 84% of medical students that had performed pelvic exam(s) under anesthesia, 67% stated that they never or rarely witnessed explicit consent being obtained for a student to perform the pelvic exam under anesthesia. It is possible that such consent had been obtained when the clinician provided a discussion of the type of procedures to be performed, along with a discussion of the risks, benefits, and alternatives to the procedures. This discussion typically takes place at a preoperative visit.

A study in The BMJ in 2003 found that a quarter of surveyed students at Bristol Medical School, in the UK, felt they had given pelvic exams to anesthetised patients who may not have consented. The General Medical Council guidelines stated that permission must be sought from the patient before any kind of check or treatment. Due to this, a formal investigation began at the school and the school emphasised that they now gain consent from patients before any exams are undertaken.

Students have described pressure to do the examinations from their superiors. They have reported that they believed "they did not have the personal autonomy to object to performing pelvic EUAs that they believed were unconsented."

== Support ==
The New York Times found that "doctors often argued that patients implicitly consented to being enlisted in medical teaching when visiting a teaching hospital, or that consent for one gynecological procedure encompassed consent for any additional, related exams."

People have described beliefs that if consent was asked, medical students would not be able to get experience performing pelvic exams. A utilitarian perspective argues that the educational benefit and consequential benefit to future patients is invaluable.

Others have opposed bans to maintain institutional autonomy and prevent government overreach.

== Opposition ==
A social media hashtag, #MeTooPelvic, was created. People have described the exams as violating and traumatizing. They have been described as sexual assault, and a comparison to rape has been drawn due to the digital penetration without consent.

The Association of Professors of Gynecology and Obstetrics recommends that pelvic examinations only be done with explicit consent.

A 2022 study of third and fourth year medical students at the University of Pittsburgh School of Medicine found that 75% of students believed that explicit consent should be obtained for educational pelvic exams under anesthesia.

== Legality ==
=== United States ===
The practice was first banned by California in 2003, followed by Illinois, Virginia, Oregon, Hawaii, Iowa, Utah, and Maryland in subsequent years. By 2019, it was still legal in 42 states, though some individual medical schools, such as Harvard, had implemented bans. By 2023, more than 20 states had enacted bans on such exams. In 2024, the United States federal Department of Health and Human Services issued new guidance to teaching hospitals and medical schools April 1, requiring that medical providers obtain written consent before performing intimate examinations, particularly on patients under anesthesia. Hospitals that do not obtain explicit consent may be ineligible to participate in Medicare and Medicaid programs and may be subject to fines and investigations for violating patient privacy laws. Additionally, the Office for Civil Rights announced that they were investigating complaints that patients’ health information had been disclosed to medical trainees in violation of the Health Insurance Portability and Accountability Act of 1996 Privacy Rule.

=== France ===
In 2015, it was revealed that some doctors had been using patients under general anesthesia as teaching tools for their students, performing rectal and vaginal examinations without consent. The most vocal critics were a group of fifty doctors, feminists, and social workers who wrote an open letter to the French government demanding an end to the practice. In response to the revelations, Health Minister Marisol Touraine requested an official report from the deans of medical schools at teaching hospitals. The report found that one in three pelvic examinations performed by first-year students, and one in five conducted by later-year students, were carried out without the patient's consent. In 2016, Touraine introduced new rules banning examinations on unconscious patients without consent. President Jean Marty of the gynecologists’ and obstetricians’ federation said the new rules were "disruptive" for patients and Bernard Hédon, head of the national college of gynecologists and obstetricians, labeled them as "prudishness."

=== United Kingdom ===
The General Medical Council in the UK says the doctors must be sure that the patient has given consent to the proposed examination, or they must ensure that it is in the best interests of the patient if they are unable to give consent. Doctors must not perform or supervise an intimate exam for educational purposes without first checking that the patient has given written consent. However patients who had undergone laparoscopic exams have complained that they were not made aware that they would be subject to pelvic exams and the use of uterine manipulators while under anesthesia. Legal experts commenting on the cases said that the patients consent had likely been implied why they signed the consent forms for the laparoscopy and that the doctors involved may have relied on the assumption that they would have consented had the patient's been conscious.

=== Australia ===
The Medical Board of Australia guidance states that patients must give consent before physical exam, including ones where students are instructed to perform examinations on anaesthetised patients. To perform an exam without consent could be considered sexual assault, or rape.
