= Rape myth =

False beliefs about rape

Rape myths are prejudicial, stereotyped, and false beliefs about sexual assaults, rapists, and rape victims. They often serve to excuse sexual aggression, create hostility toward victims, and bias criminal prosecution.

Extensive research has been conducted about types, acceptance, and impact of rape myths. Rape myths significantly influence the perspectives of jurors, investigative agencies, judges, perpetrators, and victims. False views about rape lead to victim blaming, shaming, questioning of the victim's honesty, and other problems. Determination of the guilt of the accused, and sentencing for sexual crimes, are also influenced by these beliefs.

== Development of the concept ==
Rape myths originate from various cultural stereotypes, such as traditional gender roles, acceptance of interpersonal violence, and misunderstanding the nature of sexual assault. Matthew Hale, a British jurist in the 17th century, suggests that rape is "an accusation easily to be made and hard to be proved and harder to be defended against by the party accused, tho [sic] never so innocent". His historical thoughts invisibly support many rape myths seen today, and continue to be reproduced in rape trials.

Rape myths first became a topic of research during the 1970s, when a number of studies and books explored the concept. In 1974, for example, feminist writer Susan Brownmiller decried "male myths of rape" which "deliberately obscure the true nature of rape" in her book Against Our Will: Men, Women and Rape. The same year, criminologists Julia and Herman Schwendinger studied common misconceptions about rape, including the notion that rape was impossible—i.e., that any woman who really wanted to could prevent a rape—the idea victims of rape were "asking for it," and the idea that men rape because of "uncontrollable passions." They termed these misconceptions "sexist myths" which "influence the treatment of women victims." Both Brownmiller's work and the Schwendingers' study suggested that rape myths perpetuated male violence against women by placing blame on the victim, excusing the rapist, and minimizing or justifying the act of rape.

In 1980, Martha Burt published the first major study of rape myth acceptance. Burt defined rape myths as "prejudicial, stereotyped and false beliefs about rape, rape victims and rapists" which create "a climate hostile to rape victims." Burt's definition has been widely used.

In 1994, Kimberly A. Lonsway and Louise F. Fitzgerald defined rape myths as "attitudes and beliefs that are generally false but are widely and persistently held, and that serve to deny and justify male sexual aggression against women."

Some scholars, such as Gerd Bohner and Heike Gerger, have argued that descriptors such as "false" and "widely held" should not be included in a formal definition of what rape myths are since myths are often constructed in a way that are impossible to falsify, (as in the example, "many women secretly desire to be raped," where "secret" desire cannot be disproven) and the degree to which rape myths are "widely held" or accepted may vary over time. Bohner has offered an alternative definition of rape myths as "descriptive or prescriptive beliefs about rape (i.e., about its causes, context, consequences, perpetrators, victims and their interaction) that serve to deny, downplay or justify sexual violence against women."

While scholars disagree somewhat on how to precisely define the concept of rape myths, and rape myths can vary across different cultures and societies, there is a general consensus that there are four basic types of rape myths: those that blame the victim for their rape, those that express doubt or disbelief about victim's reports of a rape, those that exonerate the rapist, and those that suggest that only a certain type of victim gets raped.

Lonsway, Fitzgerald and Diana L. Payne wrote in 1999 that the term "rape myth" does not imply that a given scenario never occurs, and "it is clear that any individual instance might conform to the characteristics described in cultural male mythology," since there is "undeniably some percentage of women" who have made false reports of rape, and there are "certain situational or personal characteristics that differentiate women who have been raped from those who have not." They argue, however, that rape myths are "generally false" in nature, and function to deny and justify the victimization of women.

=== Heteronormative discourses ===
Heteronormativity and associated discourses undergird and perpetuate many rape myths. The construction of the male sexual subject and female passive object serves to de-legitimatize allegations of sexual assault that are contrary to heterosexual norms, such as where women are perpetrators and men are victims. Through the "male sexual drive discourse," it is thought that men are always ready and desiring sex, and women "activate their interest," which can invalidate experiences that do not conform to this discourse. Similarly, the "have/hold discourse" produces women as asexual, and heterosexual pleasure comes secondary to the ultimate goal of having a relationship and family.

== Common rape myths ==
=== Rape myths involving female victims ===
Common rape myths involving female victims may include:

- That women commonly or routinely lie about rape.
- That what the victim is wearing can lead to a sexual assault, or that rape is the victim's fault if they wore revealing clothes.
- That victims bear responsibility for an assault if they were intoxicated when it happened.
- That most rapes are committed by strangers. (In reality, most rapes are committed by friends, family, or other individuals known to the victim.)
- That only young women deemed sexually attractive can be raped.
- That when a man pays for a dinner or date, a woman is expected to reciprocate with intercourse.
- That women who are raped often deserve it – particularly if they entered a man's home or got in his car, or that such actions indicate consent to sex.
- That it is not rape unless the victim fights/physically resists, or that it is not rape unless the victim is physically coerced or injured. (In reality, many rapes do not involve physical coercion, as in cases where the victim is impaired/unconscious, or where an unequal power relationship forces the victim to submit.)
- That a woman should be able to avoid rape by "fighting off" the rapist, and that she has the responsibility to do so.
- That some women secretly want to be raped.
- That the victim enjoyed being raped if they had experienced orgasm or became aroused.
- That it is impossible to rape one's wife or intimate partner.
- That rape is simply unwanted sex, not a violent crime.
- That women "ask for" rape – for example, by flirting, dressing provocatively, consuming alcohol or behaving promiscuously – or that only certain "kinds of" women (i.e., "bad girls") are raped.
- That women often say no when they really mean yes, as a way of leading men on.
- That men are unable to control themselves once they become sexually excited, that women are responsible for rape if they allow things to go too far, or that consent to kissing, petting, etc. constitutes consent to intercourse.
- That women commonly falsely allege rape out of spite, to overcome guilt after a sexual encounter they regret, to cover up an unwanted pregnancy, or for attention.
- That most rapists are psychotic or mentally ill.
- That consent to one sexual encounter constitutes consent to another (i.e., that it cannot be rape if the victim and rapist have previously had consensual sex).
- That "real" victims report rape immediately. (In reality, victims often do not report rapes immediately due to societal pressure, possible backlash, and trauma such as rape-related post traumatic stress disorder, also known as rape trauma syndrome. Victims of rape may also feel feelings of guilt and shame which deter them from reporting the crime, or doing so promptly.)

=== Rape myths involving male victims ===
Although it has been estimated that as many as one in three victims of rape in conflict are men, there has been less research on perceptions of rape myths of male victims. The following have been identified:

- That "a man cannot be raped by a woman".
- That "men or boys who are raped or sexually assaulted by women are lucky".
- That "rape of men happens mainly in prison".
- That "being raped by a male attacker is synonymous with the loss of masculinity".
- That "if a man becomes aroused or ejaculated while being raped, they must have liked it".
- That "men who are sexually assaulted by men must be homosexual".
- That "men are incapable of functioning sexually unless they are sexually aroused".
- That "men cannot be forced to have sex against their will".
- That "men are less affected by sexual assault than women".
- That "men are in a constant state of readiness to accept any sexual opportunity".
- That "a man is expected to be able to defend himself against sexual assault".
- That "men experience little trauma when raped by a woman".

They may also include the following beliefs:

- "Denial": That male rape does not exist.
- "Blame": That male rape is the victim's fault.
- "Trauma": That men are less traumatized by the rape.

The latter two categories show higher myth acceptance in the case when the perpetrator is a female. Male victims are also placed with the blame of their rape more often than female victims.

=== Marital rape myths ===
Jennifer Koshan states that many marital rape myths were born from British attitudes and laws during colonial times and were rationales that granted criminal immunity to husbands accused of marital rape. Such myths include:

- Women in intimate relationships are in a state of perpetual consent, or the "implied consent theory".
- Wives could not be raped, because they joined "the person of her husband", or the "theory of coverture".
- Wives became the property of their husband, and could be raped without regard for punishment.
- Women that consent to sex with their partner after being raped cannot claim to have been raped.
- Being raped by one's husband is "less severe than being raped by a stranger".
- Marital rape allegations are "vengeful women crying rape", and women are "prone to fabrication".

== Racial rape myths ==
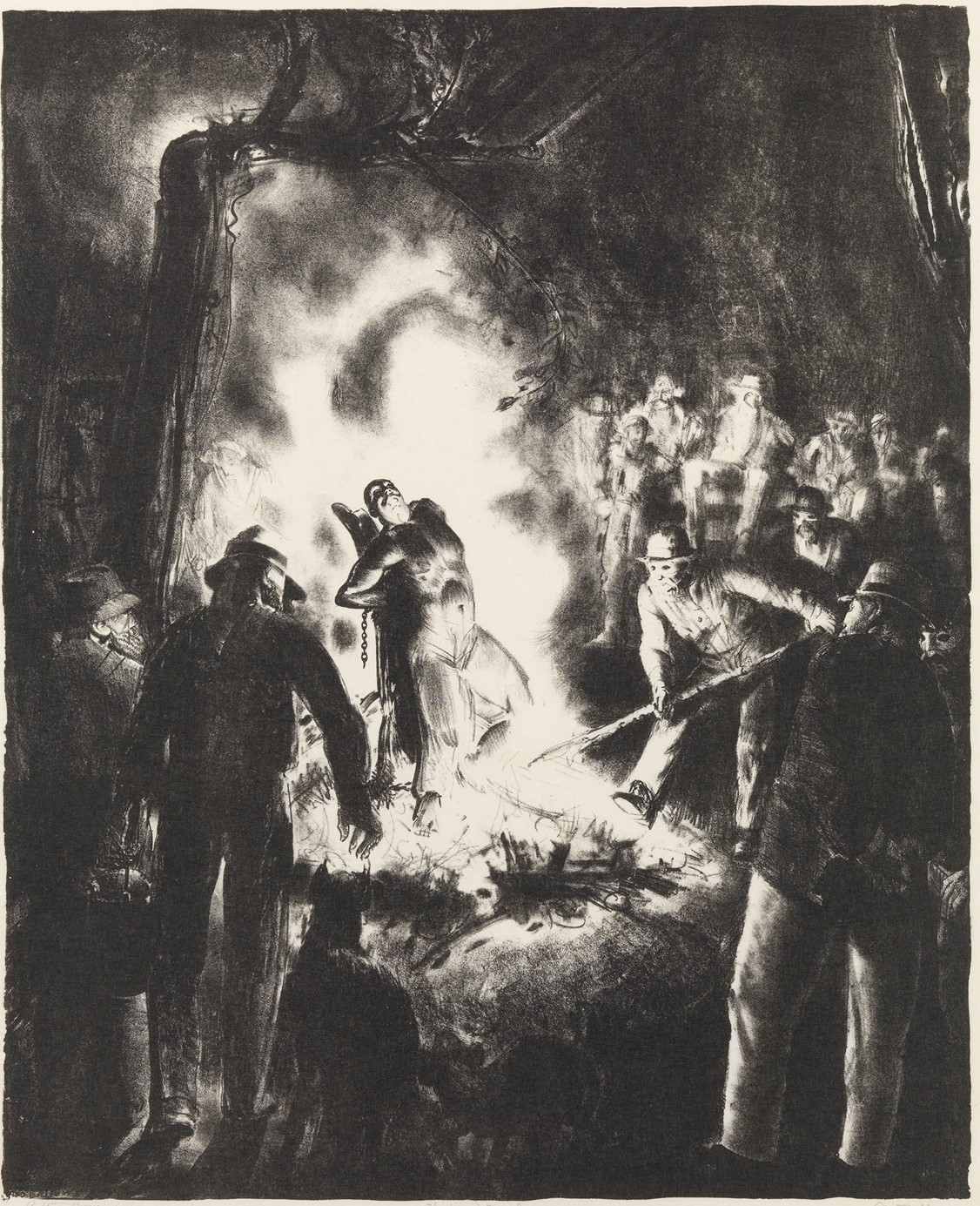
The Law Is Too Slow, 1923 anti-lynching illustration by George Bellows

Scholars have argued that racism remains a critical component of sexual violence discourse within the United States. Alcoff and Gray state that white victims who report they were raped by non-white perpetrators are more likely to be believed than non-white victims who report white perpetrators.

=== Racialization of victims and perpetrators ===
During the European colonization of North America, several White commentators were impressed by the fact that Native American men showed no sexual interest in White women. Charles Thomson noted that while Native Americans had been known to brutally murder and scalp White women, there were no known instances of them ever raping a white woman. This fueled a widespread belief that Native American men found White women to be physically unattractive, and that they would therefore be unlikely to rape a White woman. This notion has received support from modern scholars, including James Axtell. On the other hand, interracial relationships between White men and Native American women were very common on the frontier, as was the rape of Native American women.

Rooted in slavery and the white slave owners' access to black women, the "Jezebel" rape myth portrays black women as "unrapable", due to a belief that they are "sexually promiscuous" and seductive, and thus would not refuse to consent, or could tempt white men to have sex with them. Racial rape myths against African-Americans were a major factor during the nadir of American race relations, when accusations against black men regularly triggered lynchings and race riots.

Sherene Razack argues that Indigenous women in Canada are seen as hypersexual, and therefore "unrapable".

== Problems arising out of rape myths ==
The prevalence of rape myths is a major reason for rape victim blaming and stigmatization. Rape myths can cause victims of rape to blame themselves for their rape, or to not report their assault, and they can also shape the responses of judges and juries, causing a negative impact on rape victims. Some studies have shown that police officers are often distrustful of rape victims' account of their victimization, and that many of them believe some common rape myths. A Scottish survey found that many police officers believed false rape allegations are common and as a result do not believe the victim. In the UK more broadly, 19% of complainants reported Criminal Investigation Department officers making statement such as "your statement is like a fairy tale" and "you are making this up." Also, many who believe even one rape myth typically also do not believe female rape myths any more or any less than male rape myths. Though, men are also more likely to warrant rape myths rather than women.

Due to reported higher rape myth acceptance among males than females, as well as because of other gender-based differences in perceptions and standpoints, one analysis by Patricia Yancey Martin, John R. Reynolds and Shelley Keith suggested that "a judiciary made up solely of men differs from one made up of more equal proportions of women and men." Studies by Emily Finch and Vanessa Munro on mock juries found that they were heavily influenced by myths regarding intoxicated complainants, such as that "any conscious person" would "express resistance" to rape. This commentary is furthered by the writings of Mallios and Meisner, who state that rape myth acceptance is problematic in judicial settings. They assert that voir dire can be used to curb jury bias related to preconceived notions regarding rape. Judges, prosecutors and lawyers can be misinformed about rape myths, giving rise to a bias within the trial. In 1982, UK Judge Bertrand Richards infamously claimed that "It is the height of imprudence for any girl to hitch-hike at night. That is plain, it isn't really worth stating. She is in the true sense asking for it." In 2015, David Osborne, a senior barrister in the UK, published a blog named "She was gagging for it", where he claimed that men should be cleared if a rape victim is too drunk to consent.

This problem is further heightened by the fact that investigative agencies, various participants in the Legal System, and points of contacts for rape victims, for example the nearest doctor, are likelier to be male, than female. The 2015 book Asking for It by Kate Harding talks about common rape myths and about the differences between male and female rapes. One in five women and one in seventy-one men in the United States will find out what it's like to be raped, according to Harding. She writes, "Women are no more important than any other potential victims, but we are the primary targets of the messages and myths that sustain rape culture. Anyone can be raped, but men aren't conditioned to live in terror of it, nor are they constantly warned that their clothing, travel choices, alcohol consumption, and expressions of sexuality are likely to bring violations upon them."

In Asking for It, Harding writes of rape that "we tend not to treat it as a serious crime unless there's simultaneously evidence of another one". The author also quotes psychologist David Lisak. He says that "Ultimately, only a tiny handful of rapists ever serve time for rape, a shocking outcome given that we view rape as close kin to murder in the taxonomy of violent crime".

=== Twin myths ===
The twin myths suggest that a victim's previous sexual history makes them less believable, and/or more likely to consent. Canadian law does allow for the inclusion of previous sexual history, but defence counsel must present a s.276 application and a hearing is held to ensure the evidence will not be used in the context of the twin myths.

== Rape myth acceptance ==
=== Measures ===
In 1980, Martha R. Burt introduced the Rape Myth Acceptance Scale (RMA, or RMAS). The scale was the first method for measuring an individual's level of belief in rape myths, and became the most widely used. Using Burt's method, rape myth acceptance is measured by asking subjects 19 questions. The first 10 questions each consist of a statement which suggests that rape victims are responsible for their own rape, and ask the subject to assess its truthfulness, rating each statement on a seven-point scale from "strongly agree" to "strongly disagree." The 11th statement tests for the inverse of this idea, asking whether or not it is true that any woman can be raped. The remaining questions ask test subjects to guess the proportion of reported rapes that are false, and assess whether they are more or less likely to believe a rape victim based on the victim's personal characteristics (for example, their gender, their race or ethnicity, their age, or their relationship to the test subject).

Burt's original study concluded that many Americans believed in rape myths. More than half of the individuals sampled in her original survey had agreed that "a woman who goes to the home or apartment of a man" on the first date "implies she is willing to have sex," and that in the majority of rapes "the victim was promiscuous or had a bad reputation." More than half of Burt's respondents had suggested 50% or more of reported rapes were reported "only because the woman was trying to get back at a man" or "trying to cover up an illegitimate pregnancy."

Another measure is the 45-item Illinois Rape Myth Acceptance Scale (IRMA), developed by Diana L. Payne, Kimberly A. Lonsway, and Louise F. Fitzgerald in 1999. They concluded that "rape myth acceptance is most adequately conceptualized as consisting of both a general component and seven distinct myth components: She asked for it; It wasn't really rape; He didn't mean to; She really wanted it; She lied; Rape is a trivial event; and Rape is a deviant event". The developers of IRMA analyzed responses to a pool of 95 statements about rape to create their scale.

Based on the Illinois Rape Myth Acceptance Scale, the Chinese Rape Myth Acceptance Scale (CRMA) is a culturally-specific myth scale that measures acceptance of rape myths in Chinese society. The scale operates under a culturally-adapted definition of rape, specifically, in China the legal definition of rape makes no provision for marital rape and does not apply to male victims. Additionally, the definition excludes "types of coercive sexual behavior, such as other forms of penetrative sex, including oral sex, anal sex, and penetrations of the vagina or anus by other body parts like fingers or other objects." The CRMA retains 25 of 45 items from the IRMA scale and produces a five-factor structure. These myth component factors are: rape victims want to be raped; rape allegations are often false; rape must involve violence; victims are responsible for being raped; and, the motivation to rape is understandable.

=== Media influence on rape myth acceptance ===
A 2013 online survey of freshmen at a university in the northwestern United States suggested that women who consumed mainstream sports programming were more likely to accept rape myths, while for both men and women exposure to sports programming decreased the likelihood they would express an intention to intervene if they saw a sexual assault. Another survey carried out online on a research panel in 2011 found that watching soap operas is associated with higher rape myth acceptance, while the reverse was true of watching crime shows.

=== Purity culture influence on rape myth acceptance ===
Purity culture is an idealization of female virginity completely void of any education on sexual consent due to the fact that women are taught solely to avoid and reject sexual advances and encounters. Six themes of purity culture include: an emphasis on virginity, the prohibition of physical affection, the need for modesty, sexual gatekeeping, denial of female bodily autonomy, and a lack of education on sexual consent. Premarital and marital sex are concretely differentiated within purity culture, but by the same token, the differentiation between consensual sex and sexual assault is withheld. A 2021 study conducted by Biola University researchers in southeast California, United States, sought to examine the relationship between adherence to purity culture with rape myth acceptance (RMA) and an increased likelihood of misidentifying rape; the results of this study involving 90 Christian men and women yielded that adherence to purity culture's standards was related to increased acceptance and endorsement of rape myths, in addition to a heightened likelihood of mislabeling acquaintance and marital rape as consensual sex.

Moreover, the significance placed upon female purity on a cultural level could be indicative of RMA and the enhancement of rape tendencies through a positive association with the acceptance of rape myths. A 2022 five-study analysis on the relationship between the cultural prizing of purity and rape myth acceptance reported that placing significance on female purity could enhance rape tendencies through the promotion of rape myth acceptance. The data reported also support the hypothesis that the intensity of RMA beliefs assessed by the Illinois Rape Myth Acceptance Scale (IRMA) is related to the strength of purity beliefs scaled by the Female Purity Beliefs Scale (FPBS).

== See also ==
- Pregnancy from rape
- Rape culture
- Rape paralysis
- Slut-shaming
- Sexual objectification
