= Penal Code of Macau =

Penal Code

Governor of Macau
- Long title: The Penal Code as approved by Decree-law 58/95/M of 14 December, 1995
- Territorial extent: Macau
- Enacted by: Governor of Macau
- Enacted: 14 December 1995
- Signed by: Vasco Joaquim Rocha Vieira
- Signed: 14 December 1995
- Effective: 1 January 1996
- Status: In force

The current Penal Code of Macau (Portuguese: Código Penal de Macau) was promulgated in 1995, by Decree-Law no. 58/95/M, after the creation of the High Court of Justice in 1993. Prior to 1995, the 1886 Penal Code of Portugal applied to Macau.

Like Hong Kong, criminal law in Macau is different from what is applied in China.

== See also ==
- Legal system of Macau
- Crimes Ordinance (Hong Kong)
