= Penal Code of Portugal =

The current Penal Code of Portugal (Portuguese: Código Penal Português) was promulgated in 1982 and came into force on 1 January 1983 after the adoption of the Portuguese Constitution of 1976. The new Penal Code replaced the old one of 1886 after the end of the authoritarian regime of the Estado Novo in 1974 and the restoration of democratic laws in Portugal.

The Penal Code of 1886 was also applied to Macau until the adoption of the Penal Code of Macau in 1996. Similarly, the Penal Code of 1886 was applied to Angola until February 2021, when the Criminal Code of 2020 was adopted.

== Previous codes ==
Before the current Code, Portugal had the following Penal Codes:

1. Penal Code of 1837: Never came into force, because of the establishment of the Constitution of 1837
2. Penal Code of 1852: It went through major reforms throughout its history, including the abolishment of the death penalty for civil crimes in 1867
3. Penal Code of 1886

== See also ==
- Legal system of Portugal
- Murder (Portuguese law)
