= Rape paralysis =

Immobility during a sexual assault

In human sexuality, paralysis, also known as rape paralysis, involuntary paralysis, fright (or faint), or tonic immobility, is a natural bodily survival reaction which can be automatically activated by the brain of a person who feels threatened by sexual violence. During this paralysis, one cannot move and cannot say anything, until one feels safe enough again. This survival reaction is a reflex; it automatically occurs without one's conscious choice, and one cannot stop it from happening. Paralysis is a survival reaction which the brain applies to the body whenever all other options to avoid sexual violence (prevent, freeze (hypervigilance), flight, fight, compromise) have been exhausted.

In modern science, increasingly more is understood about when, how, and why paralysis occurs. However, public awareness about paralysis is still limited, which has negative consequences for the prevention, punishment and processing of sexual violence. Paralysis is sometimes also called freezing, although scholars prefer avoiding this word usage to prevent confusion with the 'freeze' (hypervigilance) response that usually precedes it (see below). (Note: 'Unfortunately, in child psychology, fright (tonic immobility, schreck, effroi) has also been referred to as "freezing." This atypical use of the term "freezing" to denote "fright" has created much confusion (especially since the ethological term closely resembles the meaning of "freeze" in military and police parlance).')

== Scientific explanations ==
In the scientific and scholarly literature, distinctions are made between several survival reactions which humans (and sometimes non-human animals) either consciously or unconsciously employ in order to survive when confronted with a potentially life-threatening situation. Terms used include:

- Prevent (or avoid)
- Freeze (also known as hypervigilance: to be cautious, aware or alert)
- Flight
- Fight
- Compromise (or keeping the peace)
- Fright, faint, paralysis, tonic immobility, or playing dead

In 1988, American psychologist J. A. Gray was the first to propose the sequence freeze, flight, fight, fright. He built on the existing concept in psychology (and later biology) of combing the responses flight and fight as a "fight-or-flight response" (first suggested by psychologist Walter Bradford Cannon in 1929; later scientists concluded that the usual sequence is first flight, and only then fight). A person sometimes still has the option of trying to keep the peace and negotiate a compromise with the person threatening them; by cooperating and offering concessions, the threatened person thereby tries to contain the damage that the aggressor is seeking to inflict on them. Paralysis or tonic immobility is the action threatened humans and animals perform whenever all other options have been exhausted: in physical contact with the aggressor, they pretend that they are dead, and thus attempt to survive the dangerous situation. Burgess & Holstrom (1976) proposed the term rape paralysis as a synonym; in the early 21st century the term tonic immobility became more common. Dutch psychologist Agnes van Minnen (2017) proposed prevent or avoid (voorkomen) as an extra strategy which precedes freeze or hypervigilance: try to prevent/avoid ending up in dangerous situations in the first place.

In child psychology, the terms freezing or freeze have sometimes been applied to the last phase of fright (tonic immobility, paralysis), but because the earlier phase of freeze (hypervigilance, being alert) has already been described by that word in ethology, this has caused a lot of confusion.

There is a fixed logic behind this sequence of survival reactions: the brain automatically considers all available options, according to the order of the reaction leading to the smallest risk of damage to the body to the reaction with the most risk. As soon as danger is detected, all possibilities are considered, and the safest available option is often employed unconsciously within milliseconds as a reflex. Paralysis is employed whenever all other options have been exhausted, and the brain decides to undergo the looming sexual violence in hopes of protecting the body against death. For example, if the threatened person would run too great a risk of being killed by trying to fight back against the aggressor, the brain could decide on paralysis in order to allow the body to survive. Aside from humans, tonic immobility is also a survival response in all other mammals, which is applied whenever fleeing or fighting would increase the risk of dying and would therefore not be the best options (anymore). Therefore, scientists think that tonic immobility as a survival response is the best explanation of why some humans paralyse when threatened by or during sexual violence.

== Prevalence ==
A 2017 Scandinavian study reported that 70% of the 298 women who had visited an emergency clinic within a month of experiencing sexual violence had experienced 'significant tonic immobility' (paralysis) when it happened. 48% even reported 'extreme tonic immobility' during the sexual assault. Moreover, 189 (almost two-thirds) of the women developed post-traumatic stress disorder (PTSD) and major depression.

== Social issues ==
=== Awareness of paralysis ===
In modern societies, a large portion of the population does not yet know what paralysis (sometimes called freezing) is, when it happens and how often. For example, a 2021 Dutch survey of I & O Research commissioned by Amnesty International involving 1,059 Dutch-speaking students showed that 22% had never heard of freezing (in the sense of 'paralysis') before, and 25% had heard of it, but did not know exactly what it meant; the remaining 53% did know. 59% of the students aged 18 or younger did not know what it was; 42% had never even heard of it. However, the older the students, the more they knew about it (61% of those aged 25 and older knew what paralysis). Moreover, only 33% of the students who did not know from personal experience or from others what sexual penetration without consent was, knew what freezing was. The survey also showed that 29% of the men had never heard of it (26% had, but did not know what it was), while only 15% of women had never heard of it (23% did, without knowing what it was). Finally, many students found that someone should clearly say 'no' if they do not want sexual penetration, even if they knew what paralysis was and that a paralysed person is unable to say 'no'. The biggest difference was between the 145 women who knew what paralysis was and found that you (therefore) do not have to say 'no' if you do not want sex (36% of all women who knew what paralysis was) and the 91 men who had never heard of paralysis and found that you should clearly say 'no' if you do not want sex (77% of all men who had never heard of paralysis).

Although men can also be victims of sexual violence (Note: A 2012 survey by De Haas, Van Berlo, Bakker and Vanwesenbeeck showed that 21% of male respondents and 56% of female respondents in the Netherlands had experienced at least one of the 13 listed forms of sexual violence.) and can also be paralysed by fear, it happens to women more often, and usually by male perpetrators, although there are also female perpetrators.

=== Consequences for potential perpetrators ===
Because of a lack of public awareness about paralysis, potential perpetrators often do not recognise paralysis in a person they want to have sex with. There is a risk that, if the initiator has asked the other person verbally or non-verbally whether the other wanted to have sex, or if the initiator had indicated their own wish to have sex, the fact that the other becomes paralysed by fear and thus is unable to say 'no' or resist, will be interpreted by the initiator as meaning that the other person does not object to sex. The initiator could falsely believe that silence means consent and proceed to initiate sexual acts with the paralysed person. In this way, it is possible that people unintentionally rape or assault a paralysed person without realising it (known as 'negligent rape' and 'negligent sexual assault', respectively). Furthermore, the assumption that every person could say 'no' or resist at any moment if they did not want to have sex, could afterwards lead the perpetrator to blame the victim for not having objected to their advances.

=== Consequences for potential victims ===
On the other hand, potential victims are often unprepared for a scenario in which they will become paralysed, and unable to say 'no' or physically resist anymore. As soon as they find themselves in that situation, it is too late. Afterwards, many victims (also known as survivors) do not understand what happened, and why they could not say or do anything to communicate that they did not want to have sex. The consequence is that they often blame themselves for being sexually assaulted because they expected to have been able to do something about it but conclude that they failed to do so (self-victim-blaming). This could lead to great shame, the tendency to tell nobody what has happened, attempts to forget the traumatic experience and erase all traces of it (including matters which could have been used as evidence against the perpetrator).

== Legal issues ==
A lack of knowledge about paralysis amongst legislators and lawyers can lead to a failure to consider sexual scenarios in which paralysis occurs. On the one hand, this could lead to legislation based on the idea that rape or assault is always accompanied by violence or coercion from the perpetrator and/or always accompanied by resistance from the victim. Such coercion-based legislation falls short in cases where paralysis prevents the victim from resisting and thus the perpetrator does not have to use force or coercion to perform sexual acts with the person who does not want to. According to such a law, no crime has been committed and the perpetrator cannot be prosecuted. As a result, there is often no legal protection for victims of sexual violence who become paralysed.

To remediate this issue, several countries not only define sexual violence by force or coercion, but also by psychological pressure and/or the defenselessness of the victim. Such legislation not only captures paralysis, but also cases where the victim was intoxicated.

Another possible solution to this problem is to base legislation about sexual violence on a lack of consent. According to this approach, the requirement that the other person communicates consent and actually does so, is the best way to ensure that the person actually wants to have sex. If the initiator does not get a response from the other person, then the initiator may decide it is better not to engage in sexual acts just to be on the safe side in case the silence is misinterpreted. Consent-based legislation eliminates the requirement to prove rape or assault based on violence or coercion by the perpetrator or the victim's resistance, which is often made impossible by the occurrence of involuntary paralysis, and thus prevents the requirement from being met in coercion-based legislation.

== See also ==
- Bodily integrity, legal principle according to which each person decides for themselves what does and does not happen to their own body
- Catatonia, a cluster of differing symptoms including the inability to speak and to move one's body
- Lex Feri, a case of a Czech parliamentarian rapist which led to change of the criminal code in order to cover also rape paralysis
- Muteness, the inability to speak in certain situations
- Post-assault treatment of sexual assault victims
- Rape
- Sexual consent, agreement to engage in sexual acts
- Sexual consent in law, legal relevance of consent
- Sexual violence, the cause of paralysis
- Stupor, brain state coupled with immobility of the body

== Literature ==
- van Minnen, Agnes (2017). Verlamd van angst. Herstellen na seksueel misbruik. Amsterdam: Boom. p. 178. ISBN 978-90-2440-898-6.
- Bracha, H. Stefan (2004). "Freeze, Flight, Fight, Fright, Faint: Adaptationist Perspectives on the Acute Stress Response Spectrum" (PDF). CNS Spectrums. 9 (9): 679–685. doi:10.1017/S1092852900001954. PMID 15337864. S2CID 8430710.
- "Meerderheid Nederlanders vindt dat "seks zonder instemming" verkrachting is". ioresearch.nl. I & O Research. 29 June 2020.
- "Een op tien vrouwelijke studenten tijdens studietijd zonder instemming gepenetreerd". ioresearch.nl. I & O Research. 9 June 2021.
