= Franklin v. State =

Florida Supreme Court case decriminalizing sodomy

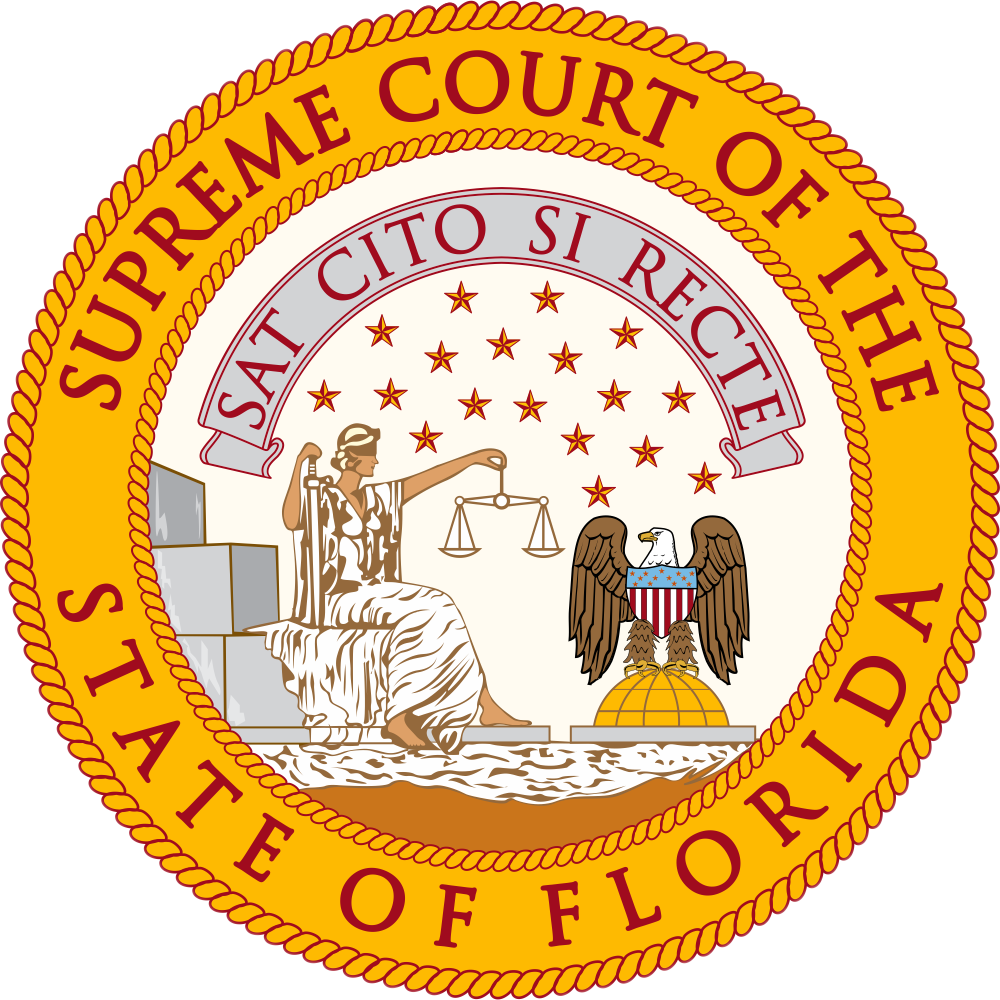
- Court: Florida Supreme Court
- Full case name: Alva Gene Franklin, Appellant, v. State of Florida, Appellee. Stephen F. Joyce, Appellant, v. State of Florida, Appellee.
- Decided: December 17, 1971
- Citation: 257 So. 2d 21

Court membership
- Judges sitting: B. K. Roberts, Richard W. Ervin, Vassar B. Carlton, James C. Adkins, Joseph A. Boyd Jr., David McCain, Hal P. Dekle

Case opinions
- Decision by: Per curiam
- Concurrence: Ervin, Carlton, Adkins, McCain, Dekle, Roberts
- Dissent: Boyd

Keywords
- Decriminalization of sodomy; Deviant sexual behavior; LGBT rights; Sex and the law; Sexual orientation discrimination

Franklin v. State, 257 So. 2d 21 (Fla. 1971), was a case in which the Florida Supreme Court struck down Florida's sodomy law as being "unconstitutional for vagueness and uncertainty in its language, violating constitutional due process to the defendants." The court retained the state's prohibition on sodomy by ruling that anal and oral sex could still be prosecuted under the lesser charge of "unnatural and lascivious" conduct, thus reducing the crime from a felony to a misdemeanor.

== Issue ==
The case involved two men, Alva Gene Franklin and Stephen F. Joyce, who were arrested for committing a "crime against nature" during the early morning hours in a parked car near the St. Petersburg waterfront. Police charged them with a felony, punishable by up to 20 years in prison, for violating Florida Statute 800.01, enacted in 1868, which read:

Whoever commits the abominable and detestable crime against nature, either with mankind or with beast, shall be punished by imprisonment in the state prison not exceeding twenty years.

In the case of Delaney v. State, 1966, the high court had previously ruled that although the common law meaning of "crime against nature" referred only to "copulation per anum and not per os," the courts of Florida had for decades already maintained that F. S. 800.01 included both oral and anal sex, and that the public could easily find out what the statute meant in that regard:

Pointing out that the statute, without further definition, merely prohibits ". . . the abominable and detestable crime against nature, either with mankind or with beast . . . ," the State logically posed the question whether it is easier for the public, or a defendant, to determine the nature of this crime by researching the history of the common law or the case law of this state. Although the opinions of this court are not always the essence of clarity, and never as lucid as we would have them, in this instance those previously rendered on this subject clearly advise all people that in this state the abominable crime against nature includes copulation either by mouth or by anus. These decisions are certainly more readily available and more easily understood than the common law. We conclude, therefore, that Section 800.01, as previously construed by this court in the cited cases, does prohibit the act charged against this appellant, and did and does afford him, and all others persons, notice that the act complained of was a crime in this state with at least the degree of definiteness required by our constitutions.

However, five years later in the Franklin case, the court explicitly reversed itself on this point.

== Decision ==
In its decision, issued on December 17, 1971, the Supreme Court overturned the felony convictions of Franklin and Joyce, which had been upheld on appeal by a district court, and stated:

The renewed attack on the language of this statute for constitutional vagueness and overbreadth is not surprising in view of the guarded wording used in such statutes in 1868 when it was drafted. A very serious question is raised as to whether the statute meets the recognized constitutional test that it inform the average person of common intelligence as to what is prohibited so that he need not speculate as to the statutory meaning. If the language does not meet this test, then it must fall and the matter must be left to legislative correction. . . .

The language in this statute could entrap unsuspecting citizens and subject them to 20-year sentences for which the statute provides. Such a sentence is equal to that for manslaughter and would no doubt be a shocking revelation to persons who do not have an understanding of the meaning of the statute. . . .

The statute, 800.01, is void on its face as unconstitutional for vagueness and uncertainty in its language, violating constitutional due process to the defendants. We anticipate and recommend legislative study of the subject and, pending further legislation in the matter, society will continue to be protected from this sort of reprehensible act under Section 800.02, Florida Statutes, F.S.A., which provides: "Unnatural and lascivious act. Whoever commits any unnatural and lascivious act with another person shall be punished by fine not exceeding five hundred dollars, or by imprisonment not exceeding six months.

Under the evidence in this case, the conduct denounced in Section 800.02, Florida Statutes, F.S.A., is a lesser included offense. Accordingly we must, without any criticism of the able trial jurist who was following the decisions then existing, reverse the two judgments adjudging the defendants of being guilty of a felony and remand the causes to the trial court with directions to enter a judgment of guilty of Section 800.02 which is a misdemeanor, and to impose sentence accordingly. In view of our former decisions, this judgment holding the felony statute void is not retroactive, but prospective only. We recede from prior opinions inconsistent with this holding.

Thus, consensual sodomy was reduced to a misdemeanor, and the lower court was ordered to find Franklin and Joyce guilty of the lesser crime.

Since the Florida Supreme Court ruling let stand convictions made before 1971, in Wainwright v. Stone two inmates convicted under the 1868 statute, Raymond Stone and Eugene Huffman, brought a case of habeas corpus before a federal court, arguing that the Florida statute was unconstitutional. The U. S. Court of Appeals for the Fifth Circuit agreed, but on November 5, 1973, the United States Supreme Court reversed the appellate court decision and affirmed the men's convictions in accordance with the Florida Supreme Court's right to declare its ruling not retroactively effective.

== Other cases ==
In other cases after 1971, the Florida Supreme Court held that the average citizen of the time would be baffled by the meaning of "detestable and abominable crime against nature" (written in 1868) but would clearly understand that the phrase "unnatural and lascivious act" (written in 1917) referred to both anal sex and oral sex, and so allowed Florida police and courts to continue with arrests and convictions for such deeds. For instance, in Thomas v. State, the court said:

We adhere to recent decisions of this Court holding that the words "unnatural and lascivious" as used in Section 800.02, Florida Statutes, are not void for vagueness and that these words are of such a character that an ordinary citizen can easily determine what character or act is intended.

These cases included, among others:

- Morris v. State, 261 So. 2d 563, April 7, 1972
- Witherspoon v. State, 278 So. 2d 611, May 30, 1973
- State v. Fasano, 284 So. 2d 683, October 17, 1973
- Thomas v. State, 326 So. 2d 413, December 3, 1975

== Legislation ==
The 1972 Florida Legislature tried but failed to agree on a replacement for the "crimes against nature" statute because legislators could not agree on whether opposite-sex couples should be included in the definition of sodomy or not. In fact, Dade County senators introduced an amendment to decriminalize all consenting-adult sex, but the proposal was defeated 24-18. Finally in 1974, the Legislature recodified and retained the "lewd and lascivious" section as a second-degree misdemeanor (punishable by a fine of $500 or up to 60 days in jail), which thereafter functioned as the state's sodomy law, enforceable against both same-sex and opposite sex couples, but primarily used to stigmatize gays and lesbians as criminals whenever the state considered an issue dealing with their civil rights.

The United States Supreme Court's 2003 ruling in Lawrence v. Texas struck down all remaining sodomy laws nationwide, including Florida's, as being unconstitutional violations of due process and privacy. Nonetheless, as of 2025, the law remains part of Florida Statutes.

In 1977, following the defeat of a gay-rights ordinance in Miami-Dade County in the face of massive opposition organized by the Save Our Children campaign, Anita Bryant urged the Legislature to reinstate the "crimes against nature" law. Legislators declined to do so, but instead passed a law forbidding adoption by gays and lesbians which remained in force until overturned as unconstitutional by a Florida appeals court in 2010.

== See also ==
- Florida Legislative Investigation Committee
- Homosexuality and Citizenship in Florida
- Lawrence v. Texas
- LGBT rights in Florida
- Sodomy laws in the United States
- Sex-related court cases
