= Gryczan v. State =

Montana Supreme Court precedent

Gryczan v. State, 283 Mont. 433 (1997), was a case in which Montana's "Deviate Sexual Conduct" law was declared unconstitutional for violating the state constitution's right to privacy.

== Lawsuit ==
On December 6, 1993, Linda Gryczan, the lead plaintiff, and five other gay and lesbian Montanans sued the State of Montana. Gryczan's lawsuit argued that the law led to discrimination in housing and employment, that it was a violation of an individual's right to privacy, and that it was an insult to Montana citizens' fundamental dignity. Attorneys representing the state by defending the law argued that because the law had never been enforced, it was unable to be properly challenged; no one had ever suffered direct injury from it, and therefore, no one had "standing" to challenge it.

The plaintiffs, to prove they had standing, argued that they had experienced social and emotional harm due to the statute. One of the plaintiffs, Stacey Haugland, testified, “Every time I’ve filled out a job application they would ask, ‘Have you been convicted of a felony?’ and I had to sit there and say, in my mind, well, not convicted.” Another plaintiff, Dr. Janet Allison, testified that, “[L]iving in a state of knowing that you can be prosecuted anytime simply for being who you are is a terrifying experience.”

The public then weighed in on the issue. The executive director of the Christian Coalition of Montana, Laurie Koutnik, argued that repealing the act “would be to cast aside millennia of moral teaching.” A spokesperson for the Eagle Forum, Arlette Randash, contended that legalizing such conduct would encourage minors to experiment with promiscuity, and that it would lead to an increase of AIDS cases among young people.

On December 8, 1995, Judge Jeffrey M. Sherlock ruled in favor of the plaintiffs, and issued an immediate injunction. In his ruling, he held that, “If, as has been suggested, the statute is an attempt to protect public morality, the statute is not doing a very good job since no one has ever enforced it.” The ruling was appealed by the state.

On July 2, 1997, the Montana Supreme Court, in a unanimous decision, upheld Judge Sherlock’s ruling. The Court found that the law violated Montana's constitutional guarantee to individual privacy. In a summary, Justice James Nelson said, “Quite simply, consenting adults expect that neither the state nor their neighbors will be cohabitants in their bedrooms.”

== Subsequent legislation ==
On January 8, 2013, Senate Bill 107 was introduced. It included a repeal of the defunct "Deviate Sexual Conduct" statute. On February 20, 2013, the Montana Senate, in its third reading, passed the bill with 38 in favor, 11 against, and 1 abstained. On April 10, 2013, the Montana House of Representatives, during its third reading, passed the bill with 65 in favor, 34 against, and 1 abstained. On April 18, 2013, Governor Steve Bullock signed the bill into law.

== See also ==
- LGBTQ rights in Montana
- Sodomy laws in the United States
- LGBTQ rights in the United States
- List of sex-related court cases in the United States
