= Sodomy in the United States military =

Punitive article of the Uniform Code of Military Justice

From February 4, 1921 to December 26, 2013, in Title 10 of the United States Code, the dual-numbered section "§ 925 - Article 125" (part of the Uniform Code of Military Justice) prohibited sodomy in the United States military. Those found guilty of violating it were punished as a court-martial may direct.

== History ==
On June 4, 1920, the United States Congress approved a modified Articles of War. Article 93 was changed to make the act of sodomy a crime in itself, separate from the offense of assault with intent to commit sodomy. The law went into effect on February 4, 1921. From February 4, 1921 to December 26, 2013, sodomy was prohibited in the United States military. Those found guilty of violating it were punished as a court-martial may direct.

On May 5, 1950, the UCMJ was passed by Congress and was signed into law by President Harry S. Truman, and became effective on May 31, 1951. Article 125 forbids sodomy among all military personnel, defining it as "any person subject to this chapter who engages in unnatural carnal copulation with another person of the same or opposite sex or with an animal is guilty of sodomy. Penetration, however slight, is sufficient to complete the offence."

In the aftermath of the 2003 United States Supreme Court ruling in Lawrence v. Texas, the Court of Appeals for the Armed Forces ruled that the decision applied to Article 125, severely narrowing the previous ban on sodomy. In both United States v. Stirewalt and United States v. Marcum, the court ruled that the "conduct [consensual sodomy] falls within the liberty interest identified by the Supreme Court," but went on to say that despite the application of Lawrence to the military, Article 125 can still be upheld in cases where there are "factors unique to the military environment" that would place the conduct "outside any protected liberty interest recognized in Lawrence." Examples of such factors include rape, fraternization, public sexual behavior, or any other factors that would adversely affect good order and discipline. Convictions for consensual sodomy have been overturned in military courts under Lawrence in both United States v. Meno and United States v. Bullock.

On December 26, 2013, President Barack Obama signed the National Defense Authorization Act for Fiscal Year 2014 into law, replacing the sodomy prohibition provision with forcible sodomy and bestiality prohibition provision.

In 2016 the punitive articles of the Uniformed Code of Military Justice were reformed as part of the National Defense Authorization Act for Fiscal Year 2017. Sodomy along with any consensual sexual activity was stricken from the punishable offences. The new article 125 covers kidnapping.

== See also ==
- Sexual orientation and gender identity in the United States military
  - Sexual orientation in the United States military
- Sodomy laws in the United States
