= Powell v. State =

1998 Supreme Court of Georgia case

Powell v. State of Georgia
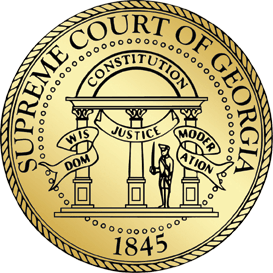
- Court: Supreme Court of Georgia
- Full case name: Powell v. The State.
- Decided: November 23, 1998
- Citations: 510 S.E.2d 18; 270 Ga. 327

Court membership
- Judges sitting: Robert Benham, Norman S. Fletcher, Carol W. Hunstein, Leah Ward Sears, George H. Carley, Hugh P. Thompson, P. Harris Hines

Case opinions
- Majority: Benham, joined by Fletcher, Hunstein, Sears, Thompson, Hines
- Concurrence: Sears
- Dissent: Carley

Keywords
- Decriminalization of sodomy; LGBT rights; Sex and the law

Powell v. State of Georgia, S98A0755, 270 Ga. 327, 510 S.E. 2d 18 (1998), was a decision of the Supreme Court of Georgia in the U.S. state of Georgia that overturned its law against sodomy within the state. The Court ruled that the Georgia Constitution granted a right to privacy, and that outlawing oral or anal sex between consenting adults was a violation of the state constitution, thus deeming it "unconstitutional".

While the plaintiff in Powell had been engaged in heterosexual sex, the overturning of the sodomy ban also decriminalized same-sex sexual activity within the state of Georgia.

== Background ==
Anthony Powell was charged with a complaint in which he had performed non-consensual oral sex upon his wife's 17-year-old niece in his house. The jury acquitted him of the non-consensual portion of the complaint, but convicted him of consensual sodomy.

In its appeal, the defense argued the statute was unconstitutional; the state argued that a conviction such as this was explicitly upheld by the U.S. Supreme Court in the case of Bowers v. Hardwick, 478 U.S. 186 (1986).

In Bowers, the Attorney General of Georgia had conceded that the sodomy law could not be applied to married heterosexuals, given the U.S. Supreme Court's ruling in Griswold v. Connecticut. Justice John Paul Stevens had observed in his Bowers dissent that Eisenstadt v. Baird had extended Griswold to unmarried heterosexuals, so the sodomy law should not apply to unmarried homosexuals either.

== Decision of the court ==
The Georgia Supreme Court struck down the sodomy statute by a vote of 6–1. The Court found that the individual's right to privacy in the Georgia Constitution are stronger and broader than those in the U.S. Constitution's Fourth Amendment. The majority noted that "privacy rights protected by the U.S. Constitution are not at issue in this case," while the dissenting justice cited Bowers extensively.

Powell's conviction was overturned.

== Impact ==
Although this case involved heterosexual activity, the decision overturned the state's sodomy law and had the effect of making homosexual sexual activity legal in the State of Georgia. Sodomy laws were overturned nationwide five years later, when Lawrence v. Texas (2003) overruled Bowers v. Hardwick.

== See also ==
- Sex-related court cases
- LGBT rights in Georgia
