= List of sex-related court cases in the United States =

Court cases dealing with sexuality and related issues

The United States Supreme Court and various U.S. state courts have decided several cases regarding pornography, sexual activity, and reproductive rights. The trend has been one of courts striking down states' attempts to regulate sex.

The following is a list of noteworthy sex-related court cases in order by date. (Note that in the legal sense, the term "sodomy" often applies not only to anal sex but also to oral sex and other sex acts.)

- Buck v. Bell, 274 U.S. 200 (1927). A law which allowed the state to sterilize the mentally handicapped is constitutional.
- United States v. One Package of Japanese Pessaries, 86 F.2d 737 (2nd Cir. 1936). The Comstock Act's prohibition against birth control products or information as obscene/lewd or lascivious was held to not apply to shipments from a physician. The federal government could not interfere with doctors providing contraception to their patients.
- Skinner v. State of Oklahoma, ex rel. Williamson, 316 U.S. 535 (1942). A law punishing certain classes of criminals with sterilization is unconstitutional.
- Roth v. United States, 354 U.S. 476 (1957). Obscenity is defined as material that "to the average person, applying contemporary community standards, the dominant theme of the material, taken as a whole, appeals to prurient interest".
- One, Inc. v. Olesen, 355 U.S. 371 (1958). Applying the Roth test, the Court ruled that homosexual content is not by definition obscene.
- Poe v. Ullman, 367 U.S. 497 (1961). In the absence of an actual threat of prosecution, plaintiffs do not have standing to challenge Connecticut law making use of contraceptives illegal.
- McLaughlin v. Florida, 379 U.S. 184 (1964). The law prohibiting an unmarried interracial couple from habitually living in and occupying the same room in the nighttime that does not apply to couples of the same race violates equal protection clause.
- Griswold v. Connecticut, 381 U.S. 479 (1965), 85 S.Ct. 1678, 14 L.Ed.2d 510. Laws prohibiting the distribution of condoms to married persons are unconstitutional.
- Stanley v. Georgia, 394 U.S. 557 (1969). Mere possession of obscene material in one's home cannot be made a crime.
- Franklin v. State, 257 So.2d 21 (Fla. 1971). Florida Supreme Court finds law against "crimes against nature" unconstitutionally vague in the case of consensual sodomy, thus the crime could now only be charged under a different, lesser statute, reducing the penalty from a felony to a misdemeanor.
- Eisenstadt v. Baird, 405 U.S. 438 (1972). Overturned Massachusetts law that made giving contraceptives to unmarried persons a felony.
- Miller v. California, 413 U.S. 15 (1973). For a publication to be considered obscene, taken as a whole, it must appear to "the average person, applying contemporary community standards", to appeal to the prurient interest, depict sexual conduct in a patently offensive way, and lack serious literary, artistic, political, or scientific value.
- Jenkins v. Georgia, 418 U.S. 453 (1974). Theatre manager's conviction of "the crime of distributing obscene material" for showing the film Carnal Knowledge overturned as the film is not obscene.
- Cox Broadcasting Corp. v. Cohn, 420 U.S. 469 (1975) A law that prohibits releasing the name of a rape victim is generally unconstitutional.
- State of Iowa v. Robert Eugene Pilcher, 242 N.W.2d 348 (Iowa 1976). A law against consensual sodomy with someone not one's spouse is unconstitutional.
- Doe v. Commonwealth's Attorney of Richmond, 425 U.S. 901 (1976) (1976). U.S. Supreme Court gave summary decision which sustained lower court's finding that Virginia's sodomy statute is constitutional.
- State of New Jersey v. Saunders, 381 A.2d 333 (N.J. 1977). A statute prohibiting fornication (sex between unmarried persons) is unconstitutional.
- Carey v. Population Services International, 431 U.S. 678 (1977). Statute prohibiting sale or distribution of contraceptives to a minor under 16; for anyone other than a licensed pharmacist to distribute contraceptives to persons 16 or over; and for anyone, including licensed pharmacists, to advertise or display contraceptives, is unconstitutional.
- Stump v. Sparkman, 435 U.S. 349 (1978). A judge who ordered the sterilization of an allegedly retarded young woman was immune from civil suit even though he did not hold a hearing to receive evidence or appoint an attorney to represent the woman's interests.
- People v. Onofre, 415 N.E.2d 936 (N.Y. 1980). A New York State law against consensual sodomy is unconstitutional.
- Commonwealth v. Sefranka, 414 N.E.2d 602, (Mass. 1980). The term "lewd, wanton and lascivious person" used in a Massachusetts sex crime statute was unconstitutionally vague as it applied to consenting adults.
- Commonwealth v. Bonadio, 490 Pa.91, 415 A.2d 47 (Pa. 1980). A Pennsylvania law against consensual sodomy is unconstitutional. (The state would repeal the law 15 years later.)
- Baker v. Wade, 553 F.Supp. 1121 (N.D.Tex. 1982). Federal District Court finds Texas sodomy law unconstitutional; Court of Appeals for the Fifth Circuit overturns and holds law to be constitutional.
- Dronenburg v. Zech, 741 F.2d 1388 (D.C.Cir. 1984). Administrative discharge from U.S. Navy for homosexual conduct is valid because private, consensual, homosexual conduct is not constitutionally protected.
- Bowers v. Hardwick, 478 U.S. 186 (1986). Sodomy between people of the same sex in the privacy of one's home may be made illegal. (The statute was later struck down on state constitutional grounds; see Powell v. Georgia below. This case was later overturned; see Lawrence v. Texas below.)
- State v. Henry, 302 Or. 510, 732 P2d 9 (1987). The Oregon Supreme Court ruled that the concept of obscenity violated the free speech clause of the state constitution and abolished the offense of obscenity in that state.
- State v. Morales, 826 S.W.2d 201 (1992). Texas statute that criminalizes private sexual relations between consenting adults of the same sex is unconstitutional.
- Commonwealth v. Wasson, 842 S.W.2d 487 (1992). A Kentucky law against consensual sodomy is unconstitutional.
- City of Dallas v. England, 846 S.W.2d 957; 1993 Tex. App. LEXIS 451 (1993). Citing State v. Morales, Texas state appellate court affirms lower court decision finding prohibition on hiring gays and lesbians as police officers unconstitutional.
- State of Idaho v. Holden, 890 P.2d 341 (Idaho Ct. App. 1995). A statute prohibiting private consensual oral sodomy between married persons is unconstitutional, because it infringes upon the constitutional right of privacy.
- Campbell v. Sundquist, 926 S.W.2d 250 (Tn. App. 1996). A Tennessee law against consensual sodomy is unconstitutional.
- Gryczan v. Montana, 942 P.2d 112 (1997). The Montana State Supreme Court finds law against consensual sodomy unconstitutional.
- Powell v. Georgia, 270 Ga. 327, 510 S.E. 2d 18 (1998). The Georgia State Supreme Court finds the law making consensual sodomy a crime which was upheld by the U.S. Supreme Court in Bowers to be unconstitutional as violating the state constitution's privacy protections.
- Williams v. State, No. 980360311/CC-1059 1998 Lexis 260 (Baltimore City Cir. Ct. 1999). State of Maryland agrees to court order declaring its law forbidding consensual sodomy unconstitutional.
- Doe v. Ventura, No. MC 01-489, 2001 WL 543734 (Minn. Dist. Ct 2001). Minnesota sodomy law found to violate state constitutional right to privacy, in cases where it is private, consensual, and non-commercial.
- Jegley v. Picado, 349 Ark. 600, 80 S.W.3d 332 (2002). Supreme Court of Arkansas finds state's sodomy law unconstitutional.
- GLAD v. Attorney General, 436 Mass. 132, 763 NE.2d 38 (2002). Massachusetts sodomy law declared unconstitutional.
- Lawrence v. Texas, 539 U.S. 558 (2003), 02-102. A Texas law making sodomy with same sex partner illegal, but not with opposite sex partner, is unconstitutional. This case expressly overturns Bowers v. Hardwick.
- State v. Limon, 280 Kan. 275, 122 P.3d 22. The first case to rely on Lawrence v. Texas as precedent. Kansas law allowing for opposite-sex statutory rape to be punished less severely than same-sex statutory rape is unconstitutional.
- Martin v. Ziherl, 607 S.E.2d 367 (Va. 2005). The Supreme Court of Virginia rules that the state criminal prohibition of sex between unmarried individuals (fornication) is unconstitutional in light of Lawrence v. Texas.
- Nitke v. Gonzales (a case involving Barbara Nitke and the National Coalition for Sexual Freedom regarding internet obscenity)
- Packingham v. North Carolina, 582 U.S. ___ (2017). A law prohibiting registered sex offenders from using social media is unconstitutional.

See Case citation for an explanation of these numbers.

== See also ==
- Landmark case
- Sodomy laws in the United States
- Timeline of reproductive rights legislation
