= Jegley v. Picado =

Court case in the United States

Jegley v. Picado

Jegley v. Picado, 349 Ark. 600, was a case in which Arkansas’ sodomy law, which criminalized only same-sex conduct, was struck down on grounds that it was a violation of the state's constitutional equal protection and privacy clauses.

== Case ==
In January 1998, Lambda Legal, representing seven gay and lesbian individuals, filed a lawsuit seeking to strike down Arkansas' sodomy law.

On March 23, 2001, more than three years after the case was filed, Circuit Judge David Bogard ruled that the statute was unconstitutional and in violation of the state's constitutional protections. Bogard's ruling was appealed.

On July 5, 2002, the Arkansas Supreme Court upheld Judge Bogard's ruling in a 5–2 decision. The five justices in the majority focused their decision on Arkansas' constitutional guarantees of privacy and equal protection rather than the U.S. Constitution's, since at that time, Bowers v. Hardwick, where the U.S. Supreme Court found that state laws criminalizing homosexuality were not violations of the U.S. Constitution, was legal precedent. The two dissenting justices argued that because Arkansas' 1977 sodomy law had never been enforced, it was not able to be properly challenged.

== Subsequent legislation ==
On March 4, 2005, SB981 was filed. The bill included a repeal of the defunct sodomy ban. The Arkansas Senate voted in favor 35–0, and the Arkansas House of Representatives voted in favor 85–0, with 15 members not voting. On April 11, 2005, Governor Mike Huckabee signed the bill into law.

== See also ==
- LGBTQ rights in Arkansas
- Sodomy laws in the United States
- LGBTQ rights in the United States
- List of sex-related court cases in the United States
