= Commonwealth v. Bonadio =

Court case in the Supreme Court of Pennsylvania

Commonwealth v. Bonadio

Commonwealth v. Bonadio, 490 Pa. 91 (1980), was a landmark decision of the Supreme Court of Pennsylvania in which the court ruled that a statute criminalizing voluntary deviate sexual intercourse violated the Equal Protection Clause and exceeded the grounds of police power.

== Case ==
In March 1979, the Penthouse Theater in Pittsburgh was raided by police. Mildred Kannitz and Shanne Wimbel were dancers who had engaged in oral sex with members of the audience, and they were arrested and charged with voluntary deviate sexual intercourse. Patrick Gagliano and Michael Bonadio were theater staff, and they were arrested and charged with criminal conspiracy.

Attorneys representing the four filed a motion in the Allegheny County Court of Common Pleas asking for the dismissal of the case. In July 1979, Judge George Ross dismissed the case. He found that the statute violated an individual's right to privacy, and also denied equal protection of the law to unmarried people; therefore, he found the statute unconstitutional on two grounds.

Soon after the case was dismissed, the District Attorney of Allegheny County, Robert Colville, appealed the dismissal to the Pennsylvania Supreme Court. They heard arguments in March 1980.

On May 30, 1980, the Court ruled in a 4-3 decision that the sodomy law was unconstitutional.

== Subsequent legislation ==
On January 19, 1995, House Bill No. 72 was filed. The bill included a repeal of § 3124, which criminalized "voluntary deviate sexual intercourse". The bill was passed on March 31, 1995, and the repeal took effect on May 30, 1995.

== See also ==
- LGBTQ Rights in Pennsylvania
- Sodomy laws in the United States
- LGBTQ rights in the United States
- List of sex-related court cases in the United States
