= Sodomy laws in the United States =

Aspect of United States law

Year of removal of sodomy laws by state: 1962 1971 1972 1973 1974 1975 1976 1977 1978 1979 1980 1983 1985 1992 1993 1996 1997 1998 1999 2001 2002 2003

Status of state statutes regarding sodomy or bestiality All statutes against sodomy (not including bestiality) have been invalidated (ruled unconstitutional) by state courts or Lawrence v. Texas, but 11 states have not repealed them. No statute banning sodomy Statute bans bestiality Statute bans same-sex sodomy Statute bans same- and opposite-sex sodomy

The early United States inherited sodomy laws which constitutionally outlawed a variety of sexual acts deemed illegal, illicit, unlawful, unnatural or immoral from the colonial-era based laws in the 17th century. While these laws often targeted sexual acts between persons of the same sex, many sodomy-related statutes employed definitions broad enough to outlaw certain sexual acts between persons of different sexes, in some cases even including acts between married persons.

Through the mid to late 20th century, the gradual decriminalization of consensual sexual acts led to the elimination of anti-sodomy laws in most U.S. states. During this time, the Supreme Court upheld the constitutionality of its sodomy laws in Bowers v. Hardwick in 1986. In 2003, the Supreme Court reversed that decision in Lawrence v. Texas, which invalidated any state sodomy laws, some of which were still law in the following 14 states: Alabama, Florida, Idaho, Kansas, Louisiana, Michigan, Mississippi, Missouri, North Carolina, Oklahoma, South Carolina, Texas, Utah and Virginia.

== History ==
=== The Colonial era ===
During the colonial era of American history, the various European nations which established colonies in the Americas brought their pre-existing sodomy laws (which included capital punishment) with them. In 1625, the Virginia Colony executed Richard Cornish for alleged homosexual acts with a servant, making him one of the earliest to be hanged for sodomy in North America. In 1636, the laws of Puritan governed Plymouth Colony included a sentence of death for sodomy and buggery. The Massachusetts Bay Colony followed in 1641, quoting Leviticus 20:13. The Puritan colonies, severe in their regulation of moral behavior, derived their laws from the Old Testament rather than English statutes. The establishment of the United States after their victory in the Revolutionary War did not bring about many changes in these laws. Beginning in the 19th century, the various state legislatures passed legislation which ended the status of capital punishment being used for those who were convicted under sodomy laws. South Carolina was the last state, in 1873, to repeal the death penalty for sodomy law violations. The number of times the death penalty was carried out under sodomy laws is unclear. Records show there were at least two executions, and a number of convictions with vague labels, such as "crimes against nature".

According to one source, sodomy statutes in colonial America in the 17th century were largely unenforced as male-male eroticism did not threaten the social structure, challenge the gendered division of labor, or undermine the patriarchal ownership of wealth. However, in Virginia there was a penalty of death for sodomy. In 1779, Thomas Jefferson tried to reduce Virginia's maximum punishment for sodomy to castration, but it was rejected by the Virginia legislature.

=== The 20th century and early 2000s ===
Prior to 1962, sodomy was a felony in every state punished by a lengthy term of imprisonment or hard labor. In that year, the Model Penal Code (MPC)—developed by the American Law Institute to promote uniformity among the states as they modernized their statutes—struck a compromise that removed consensual sodomy from its criminal code while making it a crime to solicit for sodomy. In 1962, Illinois adopted the recommendations of the Model Penal Code and thus became the first state to remove criminal penalties for consensual sodomy from its criminal code, almost a decade before any other state. Over the years, many of the states that did not repeal their sodomy laws had enacted legislation reducing the penalty.

At the time of the Lawrence decision in 2003, the penalty for violating a sodomy law varied widely from jurisdiction to jurisdiction among those states retaining their sodomy laws. The harshest penalties were in Idaho, where a person convicted of sodomy could earn a life sentence. Michigan followed, with a maximum penalty of 15 years' imprisonment while repeat offenders got life. By 2002, 36 states had repealed their sodomy laws or their courts had overturned them. By the time of the 2003 Supreme Court decision, the laws in most states were no longer enforced or were enforced very selectively. The continued existence of these rarely enforced laws on the statute books, however, is often cited as justification for discrimination against gay men, lesbians, and bisexuals.

In 2003, Justice Anthony Kennedy, authoring the majority opinion in Lawrence v. Texas, stated that American laws targeting same-sex couples did not develop until the last third of the 20th century and that early sodomy laws seemed not to have been enforced for private consensual acts.

==== New York ====
In 1950, New York enacted a new statute that divided the crime of sodomy into 3 degrees. First degree sodomy, with a maximum penalty of 20 years of imprisonment, is defined as being done by force as in rape, or an act with an animal or a dead body. Second degree sodomy, with a maximum penalty of 10 years of imprisonment, includes acts of anal or oral sex by a person over 21 years old with a person under 18 years old. Third degree sodomy, which is a misdemeanor with a maximum of 6 months in prison, is any act of anal or oral sex not amounting to first or second degree sodomy. With this new law, New York became the first state to reduce the crime of sodomy from a felony to a misdemeanor. A psychopathic offender law was included with this statute, but covered only sexual acts with minors or with the use of force or threats. In 1950, the Attorney General issued an opinion that the governing sodomy law covered both participants in an act of fellatio, the wording of the law being broader for oral sex than for anal. This opinion would be affirmed by a court interpretation more than a decade later.

In 1965, New York enacted a new statute repealing the crime of sodomy. Due to opposition to repealing the crime of sodomy, New York enacted a new statute at the same time that criminalized sodomy while reducing the maximum penalty from 6 months to 3 months, and also excluding married couples. It created the category of sexual misconduct, defined as engaging in sexual intercourse with another person without such person's consent or engaging in sexual conduct with an animal or a dead human body, which became a class A misdemeanor. Since the new statute repealing the crime of sodomy would only be effective on September 1, 1967, it never took effect.

=== Lawrence v. Texas ===
On June 26, 2003, the United States Supreme Court ruled in the Lawrence v. Texas decision that U.S. state laws criminalizing sodomy between consenting adults are unconstitutional. Their decision struck down statutes that criminalized consensual sodomy in the following jurisdictions (14 US states, 1 US territory and the Uniform Code of Military Justice): Alabama, Florida, Idaho, Kansas, Louisiana, Michigan, Mississippi, Missouri (rest of the state outside of the Missouri Court of Appeals, Western District), North Carolina, Oklahoma, Puerto Rico, South Carolina, Texas, United States Armed Forces, Utah and Virginia. On June 26, 2003, at the time of the Lawrence v. Texas decision, the following jurisdictions (20 US states, 1 US territory and the Uniform Code of Military Justice) had statutes criminalizing consensual sodomy: Alabama, Arkansas, Florida, Idaho, Kansas, Kentucky, Louisiana, Maryland, Massachusetts, Michigan, Minnesota, Mississippi, Missouri, Montana, North Carolina, Oklahoma, Puerto Rico, South Carolina, Texas, United States Armed Forces, Utah and Virginia.

=== After Lawrence v. Texas ===
In 2005, Arkansas repealed its sodomy law, and in 2006, Puerto Rico repealed their various anti-sodomy statutes, while Missouri repealed its law against "homosexual conduct". In 2013, Montana removed "sexual contact or sexual intercourse between two persons of the same sex" from its definition of deviate sexual conduct, Virginia repealed its lewd and lascivious cohabitation statute, and sodomy was legalized in the US armed forces. In 2005, basing its decision on Lawrence, the Supreme Court of Virginia in Martin v. Ziherl invalidated § 18.2-344, the Virginia statute making fornication (sexual intercourse between unmarried persons) a crime.

On January 31, 2013, the Senate of Virginia passed a bill repealing § 18.2-345, the lewd and lascivious cohabitation statute enacted in 1877. On February 20, 2013, the Virginia House of Delegates passed the bill by a vote of 62 to 25 votes. On March 20, 2013, Governor Bob McDonnell signed the repeal of the lewd and lascivious cohabitation statute from the Code of Virginia. On March 12, 2013, a three-judge panel of the Court of Appeals for the Fourth Circuit struck down § 18.2-361, the crimes against nature statute. On March 26, 2013, Attorney General of Virginia Ken Cuccinelli filed a petition to have the case reheard en banc, but the Court denied the request on April 10, 2013, with none of its 15 judges supporting the request. On June 25, Cuccinelli filed a petition for certiorari asking the U.S. Supreme Court to review the Court of Appeals decision, which was rejected on October 7.

On February 7, 2014, the Virginia Senate voted 40-0 in favor of revising the crimes against nature statute to remove the ban on same-sex sexual relationships. On March 6, 2014, the Virginia House of Delegates voted 100-0 in favor of the bill. On April 7, the Governor submitted a slightly different version of the bill. It was enacted by the legislature on April 23, 2014. The law took effect upon passage. On February 26, 2019, the Utah legislature voted to eliminate the crime of sodomy between consenting adults. Governor Gary Herbert signed the bill into law on March 26, 2019.

On May 23, 2019, the Alabama House of Representatives passed, with 101 voting yea and 3 absent, Alabama Senate Bill 320, repealing the ban on "deviate sexual intercourse". On May 28, 2019, the Alabama State Senate passed Alabama Senate Bill 320, with 32 yea and 3 absent. The bill took effect on September 1, 2019.

On March 18, 2020, the Maryland legislature voted to repeal its sodomy law. The bill became law in May 2020 without the signature of Governor Larry Hogan. While the original text of the bill intended to repeal both the state's sodomy law and "unnatural or perverted sexual practice law", amendments from the Maryland Senate urged to solely repeal the sodomy law. On March 31, 2023, the Maryland legislature voted to repeal the "unnatural and perverted sexual practice" law. The bill was sent to Governor Wes Moore for signature. As he did not veto the bill within 30 days of passage, Moore allowed for the bill to become law without his signature, and the repeal took effect on October 1, 2023.

In March 2022, Idaho repealed its sodomy law. The repeal was a result of a lawsuit brought on in September 2020 by a plaintiff known as John Doe. John Doe alleged his constitutional rights were violated when he was forced to register as a sex offender upon moving to Idaho due to a conviction for "oral sex" 2 decades prior. In July 2022, Pennsylvania's legislature voted to delete a derogatory mention of "homosexuality" in the state's Crimes Code. The bill was signed into law by Governor Tom Wolf. On May 17, 2023, the Minnesota legislature passed an Omnibus Judiciary and Public Safety Bill that included provisions repealing the state's sodomy, adultery, fornication, and abortion laws. On May 19, Governor Tim Walz signed the bill into law. It took effect the following day.

In June 2025, the Massachusetts legislature advanced a bill to repeal the state's long-dormant sodomy ban. On July 17, 2025, a joint Senate committee reported the bill for legislative consideration, and it was passed by the Massachusetts Senate on July 24, 2025. The bill awaits a vote in the Massachusetts House before heading to the state governor. On October 1, 2026, Florida repealed its sodomy law, making it the southernmost continental state to do so.

As of October 2026, the following jurisdictions (11 U.S. states) had statutes criminalizing consensual sodomy: Georgia, Kansas, Kentucky, Louisiana, Massachusetts, Michigan, Mississippi, North Carolina, Oklahoma, South Carolina, and Texas. These statutes' penalties are not enforceable due to the binding precedent of Lawrence v. Texas, meaning consensual sodomy cannot be prosecuted.

- Georgia (O.C.G.A. § 16-6-2)
- Kansas (Kan. Stat. 21-3505.)
- Kentucky (KY Rev Stat § 510.100.)
- Louisiana (R.S. 14:89.)
- Massachusetts (MGL Ch. 272, § 34.) (MGL Ch. 272, § 35.)
- Michigan (MCL § 750.158.) (MCL § 750.338.) (MCL § 750.338a.) (MCL § 750.338b.)
- Mississippi (Miss. Code § 97-29-59.)
- North Carolina (G.S. § 14-177.)
- Oklahoma (§21-886.)
- South Carolina (S.C. Code § 16-15-60.)
- Texas (Tx. Penal Code § 21.06.)

== Sodomy laws by jurisdiction in the United States ==
Below is a table of sodomy laws in the jurisdictions in United States of America and penalties as applicable to the binding precedent of Lawrence v. Texas. The most recent jurisdiction to repeal its sodomy ban is Florida.

Jurisdiction	Date statute struck down	Date statute repealed	Covered by statute						
Jurisdiction	Date statute struck down	Date statute repealed	Bestiality	Opposite-sex intercourse				Same-sex intercourse	
Jurisdiction	Date statute struck down	Date statute repealed	Bestiality	Anal sex	Married intercourse	Oral sex	Unmarried intercourse	Anal sex	Oral sex
Alabama	2003 (Lawrence v. Texas)	2019	Ala. Code 1975 § 13A-6-220 - 221						
Alaska	N/A	1980 (sodomy) 1971 (crime against nature, unnatural carnal copulation by means of the mouth, or otherwise)	A.S. 11.61.140						
American Samoa	N/A	1979	N/A						
Arizona	N/A	2001	A.R.S. § 13-1411						
Arkansas	2002 (Jegley v. Picado)	2005 1975 (law reinstated in 1977)	A.C.A. § 5-14-122						
California	N/A	1976	Cal. Penal Code § 286.5						
Colorado	N/A	1972	C. R. S. A. § 18-9-202						
Connecticut	N/A	1971	C. G. S. A. § 53a-73a						
Delaware	N/A	1973	11 Del.C. § 775						
District of Columbia	N/A	1993	D.C. Code § 22–1012.01.						
Florida	2003 (Lawrence v. Texas; unnatural and lascivious act) 1971 (Franklin v. State; crimes against nature)	2026 (unnatural and lascivious act) 1974 (crimes against nature)	West's F. S. A. 828.126						
Georgia	1998 (Powell v. Georgia)	N/A	O.C.G.A. § 16-6-6	O.C.G.A. § 16-6-2					
Guam	N/A	1978	9 GCA § 70.40.						
Hawaii	N/A	1973	HRS § 711-1109.8						
Idaho	2003 (Lawrence v. Texas)	2022 1971 (law reinstated in 1972)	I.C. § 18-6602						
Illinois	N/A	1962	720 I.L.C.S. 5/12-35						
Indiana	N/A	1976	I.C. 35-46-3-14						
Iowa	N/A	1978	I.C.A. § 717C.1						
Kansas	2003 (Lawrence v. Texas)	1969 (opposite-sex intercourse)	K.S.A. 21-5504					K.S.A. 21-5504	
Kentucky	1992 (Kentucky v. Wasson)	1974 (opposite-sex intercourse)	KRS § 525.137					KRS § 510.100	
Louisiana	2003 (Lawrence v. Texas)	N/A	LSA-R.S. 14:89.3	LSA-R.S. 14:89					
Maine	N/A	1976	17 M.R.S.A. § 1031						
Maryland	1999 (Williams v. Glendening; anal sex) 1998 (Williams v. Glendening; opposite-sex oral sex and same-sex intercourse) 1990 (Schochet v. State; opposite-sex intercourse)	2023 (unnatural and perverted sexual practice) 2020 (sodomy)	MD Code, Criminal Law, § 10-606.						
Massachusetts	1974 (Commonwealth v. Balthazar)	N/A	M.G.L.A. 272 § 77 M.G.L.A. 272 § 34	M.G.L.A. 272 § 34 M.G.L.A. 272 § 35					
Michigan	2003 (Lawrence v. Texas) 1990 (Michigan Organization for Human Rights v. Kelley; applied directly to Wayne County; uncertain whether ruling was binding statewide; reversed in 1992 in People v. Brashier)	N/A	M.C.L.A. 750.158	M.C.L.A. 750.158 M.C.L.A. 750.338 M.C.L.A. 750.338a M.C.L.A. 750.338b					
Minnesota	2001 (Doe v. Ventura)	2023	M.S.A. § 609.294						
Mississippi	2003 (Lawrence v. Texas)	N/A	Miss. Code Ann. § 97-29-59						
Missouri	2003 (Lawrence v. Texas; rest of the state outside of the Missouri Court of Appeals, Western District) 1999 (State of Missouri v. Cogshell; Missouri Court of Appeals, Western District only)	2006	V.A.M.S. 566.111						
Montana	1997 (Gryczan v. State)	2013 (same-sex intercourse) 1974 (opposite-sex intercourse)	MCA 45-8-218						
Nebraska	N/A	1978	Neb. Rev. St. § 28-1010 Neb. Rev. St. 54-904						
Nevada	N/A	1993 (same-sex intercourse) 1977 (opposite-sex intercourse)	N. R. S. 201.455						
New Hampshire	N/A	1975	N.H. Rev. Stat. § 644:8g						
New Jersey	N/A	1978	N. J. S. A. 4:22-17						
New Mexico	N/A	1975	NMSA § 30-9A-3						
New York	1980 (New York v. Onofre; excluded the New York National Guard)	2000	McKinney's Penal Law § 130.20						
North Carolina	2003 (Lawrence v. Texas)	N/A	N.C.G.S.A. § 14-177						
Northern Mariana Islands	N/A	1983	N/A						
North Dakota	N/A	1973	NDCC, § 12.1-20-12						
Ohio	N/A	1974	R.C. § 959.21						
Oklahoma	2003 (Lawrence v. Texas; same-sex intercourse) 1988 (Newsom v. State; opposite-sex intercourse)	N/A	21 Okl. St. Ann. § 886						
Oregon	N/A	1972	O. R. S. § 167.333						
Pennsylvania	1980 (Commonwealth v. Bonadio)	2022 (homosexuality) 1995 (unmarried opposite-sex intercourse and same-sex intercourse) 1972 (married opposite-sex intercourse)	18 Pa.C.S.A. § 3129						
Puerto Rico	2003 (Lawrence v. Texas)	2006 (opposite-sex anal sex and same-sex anal and oral sex) 1974 (opposite-sex oral sex)	P.R. Laws tit. 33, § 4773						
Rhode Island	N/A	1998	Gen.Laws 1956, § 11-10-1						
South Carolina	2003 (Lawrence v. Texas)	N/A	Code 1976 § 16-15-120				Code 1976 § 16-15-120		
South Dakota	N/A	1976	SDCL § 22-22-42						
Tennessee	1996 (Campbell v. Sundquist)	1996 (same-sex intercourse) 1989 (opposite-sex intercourse)	T. C. A. § 39-14-214						
Texas	2003 (Lawrence v. Texas) 1970 (Buchanan v. Batchelor; reversed in 1971 by the United States Supreme Court)	1974 (opposite-sex anal and oral sex)	V. T. C. A., Penal Code § 21.09					V. T. C. A., Penal Code § 21.06	
United States Armed Forces	2003 (Lawrence v. Texas)	2013	10 U.S. Code § 934 - Art. 134.						
United States of America	N/A								
Utah	2003 (Lawrence v. Texas)	2019 1971 (law reinstated in 1972)	U.C.A. 1953 § 76-9-301.8						
Vermont	N/A	1977	13 V.S.A. § 352						
Virgin Islands of the United States	N/A	1985	14 V.I.C. § 2062						
Virginia	2003 (Lawrence v. Texas)	2014 (anal and oral sex) 2013 (lewd and lascivious cohabitation)	Va. Code Ann. § 18.2-361						
Washington	N/A	1976	West's RCWA 16.52.205						
West Virginia	N/A	1976	N/A						
Wisconsin	N/A	1983	W.S.A. 944.18						
Wyoming	N/A	1977	W.S.1977 § 6-4-601						

=== Federal law ===
Sodomy laws in the United States were largely a matter of state rather than federal jurisdiction, except for laws governing the District of Columbia and the U.S. Armed Forces.

=== District of Columbia ===
In 1801, the 6th United States Congress enacted the District of Columbia Organic Act of 1801, a law that continued all criminal laws of Maryland and Virginia, with those of Maryland applying to the portion of the District ceded from Maryland and those of Virginia applying to the portion ceded from Virginia. As a result, in the Maryland-ceded portion, sodomy was punishable with up to seven years' imprisonment for free persons and with the death penalty for enslaved persons, whereas in the Virginia-ceded portion it was punishable between one and ten years' imprisonment for free persons and with the death penalty for enslaved persons. Maryland repealed the death penalty for slaves in 1809 and modified the penalty for all persons to match Virginia's terms of imprisonment. In 1847, the Virginia-ceded portion was given back to Virginia, thus only the Maryland law had effect in the district. In 1871, Congress enacted the District of Columbia Organic Act of 1871, a law that reorganized the district government and granted it home rule. All existing laws were retained unless and until expressly altered by the new city council. Direct rule was reinstated in 1874. The criminal status of sodomy became ambiguous until 1901, when Congress passed legislation recognizing common law crimes, punishable with up to five years' imprisonment or a fine of $1,000.

In 1935, Congress made it a crime in the district to solicit a person "for the purpose of prostitution, or any other immoral or lewd purpose". In 1948, Congress enacted the first law specific to sodomy in the district, which established a penalty of up to ten years in prison or a fine of up to $1,000, regardless of sexuality. Oral sex was included in the law's application. Also included with this law was a psychopathic offender law and a law "to provide for the treatment of sexual psychopaths". The metropolitan police department eventually had several officers whose sole job was to "check on homosexuals". Multiple court cases dealt with the issue in the following years. Many of the published sodomy and solicitation cases during the 1950s and 1960s reveal clear entrapment policies by the local police, some of which were disallowed by reviewing courts. In 1972, settling the case of Schaefers et al. v. Wilson, the D.C. government announced its intention not to prosecute anyone for private, consensual adult sodomy, an action disputed by the U.S. Attorney for the District of Columbia. The action came as part of a stipulation agreement in a court challenge to the sodomy law brought by four gay men.

In 1973, Congress again granted the district home rule through the District of Columbia Home Rule Act. It provided for a new city council that could pass its own laws. However laws regarding certain topics, such as changes to the criminal code, were restricted until 1977. All laws passed by the D.C. government are subject to a mandatory 30-day "congressional review" by Congress. If they are not blocked, then they become law. In 1981, the D.C. government enacted a law that repealed the sodomy law, as well as other consensual acts, and made the sexual assault laws gender neutral. However, the Congress overturned the new law. A successful legislative repeal of the law followed in 1993. This time, Congress did not interfere. In 1995, all references to sodomy were completely removed from the criminal code, and in 2004, the D.C. government repealed an outdated law against fornication.

=== Military ===
Although the U.S. military discharged soldiers for homosexual acts throughout the eighteenth and nineteenth century, U.S. military law did not expressly prohibit homosexuality or homosexual conduct until February 4, 1921.

On March 1, 1917, the Articles of War of 1916 were implemented. This included a revision of the Articles of War of 1806, the new regulations detail statutes governing U.S. military discipline and justice. Under the category Miscellaneous Crimes and Offences, Article 93 states that any person subject to military law who commits "assault with intent to commit sodomy" shall be punished as a court-martial may direct.

On June 4, 1920, Congress modified Article 93 of the Articles of War of 1916. It was changed to make the act of sodomy itself a crime, separate from the offense of assault with intent to commit sodomy. It went into effect on February 4, 1921.

On May 5, 1950, the Uniform Code of Military Justice was passed by Congress and was signed into law by President Harry S. Truman, and became effective on May 31, 1951. Article 125 forbids sodomy among all military personnel, defining it as "any person subject to this chapter who engages in unnatural carnal copulation with another person of the same or opposite sex or with an animal is guilty of sodomy. Penetration, however slight, is sufficient to complete the offence."

As for the U.S. Armed Forces, the Court of Appeals for the Armed Forces has ruled that the Lawrence v. Texas decision applies to Article 125, severely narrowing the previous ban on sodomy. In both United States v. Stirewalt and United States v. Marcum, the court ruled that the "conduct [consensual sodomy] falls within the liberty interest identified by the Supreme Court," but went on to say that despite the application of Lawrence to the military, Article 125 can still be upheld in cases where there are "factors unique to the military environment" that would place the conduct "outside any protected liberty interest recognized in Lawrence." Examples of such factors include rape, fraternization, public sexual behavior, or any other factors that would adversely affect good order and discipline. Convictions for consensual sodomy have been overturned in military courts under Lawrence in both United States v. Meno and United States v. Bullock.

==== Repeal ====
On December 26, 2013, President Barack Obama signed into law the National Defense Authorization Act for Fiscal Year 2014, which repealed the Article 125 ban on consensual sodomy.
