= Crime against nature =

Forms of sexual behaviour not considered natural

The crime against nature or unnatural act has historically been a legal term in English-speaking states identifying forms of sexual behavior not considered natural or decent; they are considered legally punishable offenses in those states. Sexual practices that have historically been considered to be "crimes against nature" include masturbation, sodomy and bestiality.

== History and terminology ==
For much of modern history, a "crime against nature" was understood by courts to be synonymous to "buggery", and to include anal sex (copulation per anum) and bestiality. Early court decisions agreed that fellatio (copulation per os) was not included, though mainly because the practice was not spoken about when the common-law definition was established (the first attempted fellatio prosecutions under the "crime against nature" statute date to 1817 in England and 1893 in the United States.) Likewise, sexual activities between two women were not covered. Over time, particularly starting in the early 20th century, some jurisdictions started enacting statutes or developing precedents that extended the scope of the crime to include fellatio and, sometimes, other sexual activities.

The term crime against nature is closely related to, and was often used interchangeably with, the term sodomy. (This varied from jurisdiction to jurisdiction. Sometimes the two terms were understood to be synonymous; sometimes sodomy was limited to sexual activities between two humans; and sometimes sodomy was taken to include anal sex or bestiality, whereas crime against nature also included fellatio.)

Until the early 19th century, courts were divided on whether the act needed to be completed (to result in ejaculation) in order to be a punishable offense. This question was deemed sufficiently important that, in 1828, English law was explicitly amended to specify that proof of ejaculation was not necessary for convictions for buggery and rape. The crime was not limited to same-sex activities, and, in case of an act between two adults, both participants were guilty, regardless of consent. Attempted or completed act of sodomy, committed by a husband against his wife, was grounds for divorce in common law.

Historically, the offense was usually referred to by its longer name, the detestable and abominable (or abominable and detestable, or, sometimes, infamous) crime against nature, committed with mankind or beast. This phrase originates in Buggery Act 1533, with words "crime against nature" substituted for "vice of buggery" in the original, and it was present in one of these forms in criminal codes of most U.S. states. Specific acts included under this heading were typically deemed too detestable to list them explicitly, resulting in a number of vagueness-based legal challenges to corresponding statutes. One of the most recent, and one of the rare successful challenges, is the 1971 Florida case of Franklin v. State. On the other hand, just seven years prior, a similar challenge (Perkins v. State) failed in North Carolina. (In Perkins, the Court wrote that, if this were a new statute, it would have been "obviously unconstitutional for vagueness", but, since this was a statute whose history was traceable back to the reign of Henry VIII, it accumulated a number of judicial interpretations, and, backed with these interpretations, it was not unconstitutionally vague.)

Penalties for this offense varied greatly over time and between jurisdictions. Crime against nature remained punishable by death or life imprisonment both in the UK and in many U.S. states well into the 19th century. Liberalization of sexual morals led to reduction of penalties or decriminalization of the offense during the second half of the 20th century, so that, by 2003, it was no longer a punishable offense in 36 out of 50 U.S. states, and was only punishable by a fine in some of the remaining 14. (See Sodomy laws in the United States for details.)

== Current use ==
Currently, the term crime against nature is still used in the statutes of the following American states. However, these laws are unconstitutional to enforce for sexual conduct between consenting adults in light of Lawrence v. Texas (2003). The crime against nature statutes are, however, still used to criminalize sexual conduct involving minors, incest, public sex, prostitution and bestiality.

- Louisiana (R.S. 14:89) (Struck down the part of the statute that criminalized adult consensual anal and oral sex by the United States Court of Appeals for the Fifth Circuit in 2005)
- Massachusetts (MGL Ch. 272, § 34) (Struck down the part of the statute that criminalized adult consensual anal and oral sex by the Massachusetts Supreme Judicial Court in 1974)
- Michigan (MCL § 750.158)
- Mississippi (Miss. Code § 97-29-59)
- North Carolina (G.S. § 14-177) (The North Carolina Court of Appeals ruled that the crime against nature statute, N.C. G.S. § 14-177, is not unconstitutional on its face because it may properly be used to criminalize sexual conduct involving minors, non-consensual or coercive conduct, public conduct, and prostitution)
- Oklahoma (Okla. Stat. § 21-886 (2019)) (Struck down the part of the statute that criminalized heterosexual adult consensual anal and oral sex by the Oklahoma Court of Criminal Appeals in 1988) (note that the statute does not specifically outlaw offenses related to minors, which are treated elsewhere in law.)
- Rhode Island (§ 11-10-1.)
- Virginia (Va. Code § 18.2-361) (Struck down by United States Court of Appeals for the Fourth Circuit on March 12, 2013)

== Repeal and unconstitutionality ==
Except for the above eight states, all other states in the United States have repealed their "crimes against nature" laws. Furthermore, in 2003, in Lawrence v. Texas, the US Supreme Court held that nonremunerative sex between consenting adults in private was protected by the Constitution and could not be criminalized under "crimes against nature" laws. Thus, fellatio, cunnilingus and anal sex can no longer fall within the scope of such laws.

== Similar laws ==
See also Sodomy laws.

- Article 377 of the Indian Penal Code (since 1860) prohibits all sexual acts against human nature. The portion criminalising consensual sex in private between adults was struck down by the Supreme Court of India in 2018 - but officially remains on the statute books.
- Article 365 of the Sri Lankan Penal Code (through Ordinance No. 2 of 1883) criminalizes carnal intercourse against the order of nature and provides for a penalty of up to ten years in prison. The Supreme Court of Sri Lanka ruled that the law itself is non-enforceable as it violates the constitution. However, in contrast to many other courts, the Supreme Court cannot strike down articles but only interpret them. Hence, the law is still in the books.
- Paragraph 175 in the imperial penal code of the German Empire - repealed in 1994 officially.

== See also ==
- Criminal law
- Sodomy, buggery
- Legality of incest
- Natural law
