= Martin v. Ziherl =

2005 Supreme Court of Virginia case

- Court: Supreme Court of Virginia
- Full case name: Muguet S. Martin v. Kristopher Joseph Ziherl
- Decided: January 14, 2005
- Citation: 269 Va. 35; 607 S.E.2d 367; 2005 Va. LEXIS 7

Case history
- Prior actions: Demurrer sustained, Richmond Circuit Court

Holding
- Plaintiff's lawsuit for the intentional transmission of herpes was not barred by the judicial rule against recovering for injuries suffered while engaging in illegal conduct, because Virginia's criminal prohibition against sexual intercourse between unmarried individuals violated the Fourteenth Amendment to the U.S. Constitution. Richmond Circuit Court reversed and remanded.

Court membership
- Chief judge: Leroy Rountree Hassell, Sr.
- Associate judges: Lawrence L. Koontz, Jr., Cynthia D. Kinser, Donald W. Lemons, Elizabeth B. Lacy, Barbara Milano Keenan, G. Steven Agee

Case opinions
- Majority: Lacy, joined by Koontz, Kinser, Lemons, Keenan, Agee
- Concurrence: Hassell

Laws applied
- U.S. Const. amend. XIV; Va. Code § 18.2-344

Martin v. Ziherl, 607 S.E.2d 367 (Va. 2005), was a decision by the Supreme Court of Virginia holding that the Virginia criminal law against fornication (sexual acts between unmarried people) was unconstitutional. The court's decision followed the 2003 ruling of the U.S. Supreme Court in Lawrence v. Texas, which established the constitutionally-protected right of adults to engage in private, consensual sex.

Virginia's law against fornication was repealed on March 4, 2020.

== Background of the case ==
Muguet Martin and Kristopher Ziherl were an unmarried couple who had been in a sexually active relationship for two years when Martin's doctor diagnosed her with herpes. She then filed a lawsuit against Ziherl in the Richmond Circuit Court, alleging that he knew he was infected with herpes when they had unprotected sex, knew it was contagious, and failed to inform her. Her complaint claimed negligence, intentional battery and intentional infliction of emotional distress, for which she sought compensatory and punitive damages.

The Supreme Court of Virginia had ruled in Zysk v. Zysk, 404 S.E.2d 721 (Va. 1990), that plaintiffs could not recover damages for injuries suffered while participating in illegal conduct. As sex between unmarried persons was criminalized under Virginia's anti-fornication statute, Ziherl filed a demurrer in response to Martin's suit. Judge Theodore J. Markow rejected Martin's argument that the statute was no longer valid after Lawrence v. Texas, in which the U.S. Supreme Court found unconstitutional a Texas law criminalizing homosexual sodomy as an infringement upon the liberty of adults to engage in private and consensual intimate conduct under the due process clause of the Fourteenth Amendment to the United States Constitution. Judge Markow instead believed the fornication prohibition satisfied the rational basis review that Lawrence vs Texas statute failed, because the fornication law was reasonably related to the legitimate government goals of protecting public health and encouraging marriage for procreation. Ziherl's demurrer was sustained, resulting in the dismissal of Martin's suit. She subsequently appealed to the Virginia Supreme Court.

On appeal, Ziherl argued that Martin lacked standing to challenge the constitutionality of the statute because she was under no threat of prosecution, as the law had not been enforced against consenting adults since the mid-19th century. Invalidation would therefore not impact her liberty but would only allow her to pursue her lawsuit. The court refused to consider this argument, because of the longstanding rule that it would not consider a standing argument that was not first made at the trial court level.

== The court's decision ==
The Virginia Supreme Court unanimously ruled on January 14, 2005, that the Virginia fornication law violated the Fourteenth Amendment. Because the conduct by which Martin was allegedly injured could not be considered illegal, Zysk did not apply and she could proceed with her suit against Ziherl in the Richmond Circuit Court.

Lawrence v. Texas was the sole foundation for the court's ruling, and so the majority of its opinion was an interpretation of that decision. The U.S. Supreme Court in Lawrence had stated that it was adopting the reasoning of Justice John Paul Stevens in his dissent to Bowers v. Hardwick, which Lawrence overruled. The Stevens rationale, as the Virginia Supreme Court presented it, was that "decisions by married or unmarried persons regarding their intimate physical relationship are elements of their personal relationships that are entitled to due process protection." The Virginia Supreme Court stated that sexual intercourse was clearly part of the personal relationship of an unmarried couple, and that criminalizing intercourse clearly infringed upon their constitutionally protected right to make intimate choices.

Regarding Ziherl's argument that the statute served valid public interests, the court stated that in Lawrence, the U.S. Supreme Court had ruled that the Texas sodomy statute furthered "no legitimate state interest" that could justify infringing the right to intimate contact. The Virginia Supreme Court interpreted this to mean that all state interests must be insufficient to justify a prohibition on private, consensual sexual conduct, rather than only those advanced by Texas to support its statute in Lawrence. The court was careful to note that this did not pertain to laws involving minors, non-consensual or public sexual activity, or prostitution, all of which the Lawrence Court also distinguished.

== See also ==
- Sex-related court cases in the United States
- Judicial review
- Substantive due process
