= United States v. Marcum =

U.S. Armed Forces court case

United States of America v. Technical Sergeant Eric P. Marcum, 60 M.J. 198 (C.A.A.F. 2004) is a United States Court of Appeals for the Armed Forces (CAAF) decision which, among other issues, upheld Article 125 (Sodomy) of the Uniform Code of Military Justice against a facial substantive due process challenge, and ruled that the Supreme Court's decision in Lawrence v. Texas, 539 U.S. 558 (2003) applied in analyzing as-applied challenges. The decision is thus binding precedent on all courts-martial in determining if an Article 125 prosecution is constitutional.

== Case history ==
The appellant, United States Air Force Technical Sergeant Eric P. Marcum, a cryptologic linguist assigned to Offutt Air Force Base near Omaha, Nebraska, was tried by court-martial for "dereliction of duty by providing alcohol to individuals under the age of 21, non-forcible sodomy, forcible sodomy, assault consummated by a battery, indecent assault, and three specifications of committing indecent acts". On May 21, 2000, Marcum was convicted of several charges, including non-forcible sodomy in violation of Article 125. He was "sentenced to confinement for 10 years, a dishonorable discharge, total forfeitures, and reduction to the lowest enlisted grade. The convening authority reduced the confinement to six years, but otherwise approved the findings and sentence". The Air Force Court of Criminal Appeals affirmed the findings and sentence. After that, the Supreme Court delivered its opinion in Lawrence.

The CAAF the reviewed the following issues:

ISSUE I
WHETHER APPELLANT SUFFERED PREJUDICIAL ERROR WHEN HIS TRIAL DEFENSE COUNSEL REVEALED PRIVILEGED COMMUNICATIONS WITHOUT APPELLANT'S PERMISSION DURING THE SENTENCING PHASE OF APPELLANT'S TRIAL IN VIOLATION OF M.R.E. 502 AND 511.
ISSUE II
WHETHER THE MILITARY JUDGE ERRED BY INSTRUCTING THE PANEL THAT THE MAXIMUM SENTENCE IN APPELLANT'S CASE WAS LIFE WITHOUT PAROLE WHEN THE PRESIDENT HAD NOT AUTHORIZED THAT PUNISHMENT FOR APPELLANT'S OFFENSES.
ISSUE III
WHETHER APPELLANT'S CONVICTION FOR VIOLATING ARTICLE 125, UCMJ, BY ENGAGING IN CONSENSUAL SODOMY (CHARGE II, SPECIFICATION 1) MUST BE SET ASIDE IN LIGHT OF THE UNITED STATES SUPREME COURT'S HOLDING IN LAWRENCE V. TEXAS, 123 S.CT. 2472 (2003).

=== Due process challenge ===
In deciding the due process challenge, the Court first addressed the facial constitutional claim, rejecting it on the bases that "[i]n the military setting, as this case demonstrates, an understanding of military culture and mission cautions against sweeping constitutional pronouncements that may not account for the nuance of military life" and that "because Article 125 addresses both forcible and non-forcible sodomy, a facial challenge reaches too far". Turning to the as-applied challenge, the Court asked "[f]irst, was the conduct that the accused was found guilty of committing of a nature to bring it within the liberty interest identified by the Supreme Court? Second, did the conduct encompass any behavior or factors identified by the Supreme Court as outside the analysis in Lawrence? ... Third, are there additional factors relevant solely in the military environment that affect the nature and reach of the Lawrence liberty interest?" It then proceeded to reject the as-applied due process challenge, on the bases that "the military has consistently regulated relationships between servicemembers based on certain differences in grade in an effort to avoid partiality, preferential treatment, and the improper use of one's rank", that "this right [to engage in private sexual conduct] must be tempered in a military setting based on the mission of the military, the need for obedience of orders, and civilian supremacy", and that the appellant "also testified that he knew he should not engage in a sexual relationship with someone he supervised". Due to these factors, the "conduct fell outside the liberty interest identified by the Supreme Court" and the challenge was rejected.

=== Privileged communication in sentencing ===
The Court ruled that the appellant had suffered a prejudicial error when his trial counsel presented an unsworn statement that had revealed privileged communications without the appellant's permission, on the basis that "[e]vidence of a statement or other disclosure of privileged matter is not admissible against the holder of the privilege if disclosure was compelled erroneously or was made without an opportunity for the holder of the privilege to claim the privilege" and that he "did not waive his attorney-client privilege. Appellant's affidavit demonstrates that defense counsel never asked Appellant for permission to use the written summary", and that "trial counsel repeatedly referred to Appellant's unsworn statement during his sentencing argument" On this basis, the Court reversed the sentence, authorizing a sentencing rehearing.

=== Sentencing instruction ===
The court said that "In light of our decision on Issue I, we need not decide whether life without parole was an authorized punishment for forcible sodomy at the time of Appellant's offenses."

=== Concurrence and dissent ===
Chief Judge Crawford wrote a concurring and dissenting opinion. Concurring with the rejection of the due process challenge, the judge disagreed with the majority's assumption that the "Appellant's conduct falls within the protected liberty interest enunciated in Lawrence." Chief Judge Crawford dissented from the decision to reverse the sentence on the basis that "defense counsel displayed his and Appellant's intent to disclose the statement to a third party and, in so doing, established that the statement was not privileged", that because "defense counsel extensively used Appellant's statement at trial to cross-examine Government witnesses", "Appellant cannot now claim that attorney-client privilege should have prevented the statement's release", and that "Appellant, by his own misconduct, forfeited any right to object to counsel's use of the statement".

== See also ==
- Sodomy laws in the United States
- Don't ask, don't tell
- Uniform Code of Military Justice
