= Sodomy law =

Laws criminalising certain sexual acts

Legal status of sodomy around the world as of 2026: Legal Illegal

A sodomy law is a law that defines certain sexual acts as crimes. The precise sexual acts meant by the term sodomy are rarely spelled out in the law, but are typically understood and defined by many courts and jurisdictions to include any or all forms of sexual acts that are illegal, illicit, unlawful, unnatural, or immoral. Sodomy typically includes anal sex, oral sex, manual sex, and bestiality. In practice, sodomy laws have rarely been enforced to target against sexual activities between individuals of the opposite sex, and have mostly been used to target against sexual activities between individuals of the same sex.

As of September 2025, 63 countries have laws that criminalize sexual activity between 2 individuals of the same-sex. In 2006, that number was 92. Laws in 40 of these countries criminalize both male and female same-sex sexual activity. In 11 countries, sexual activity between two individuals of the same-sex is punishable with the death penalty.

In 2011, the United Nations Human Rights Council passed an LGBT rights resolution, which was followed up by a report published by the UN Human Rights Commissioner which included scrutiny of the mentioned codes. In March 2022, the Committee on the Elimination of Discrimination against Women found that laws criminalizing consensual same-sex activity between women are a human rights violation. This case, brought by Rosanna Flamer-Caldera, was the first United Nations case to focus on lesbian and bisexual women.

== History ==
=== Criminalization ===
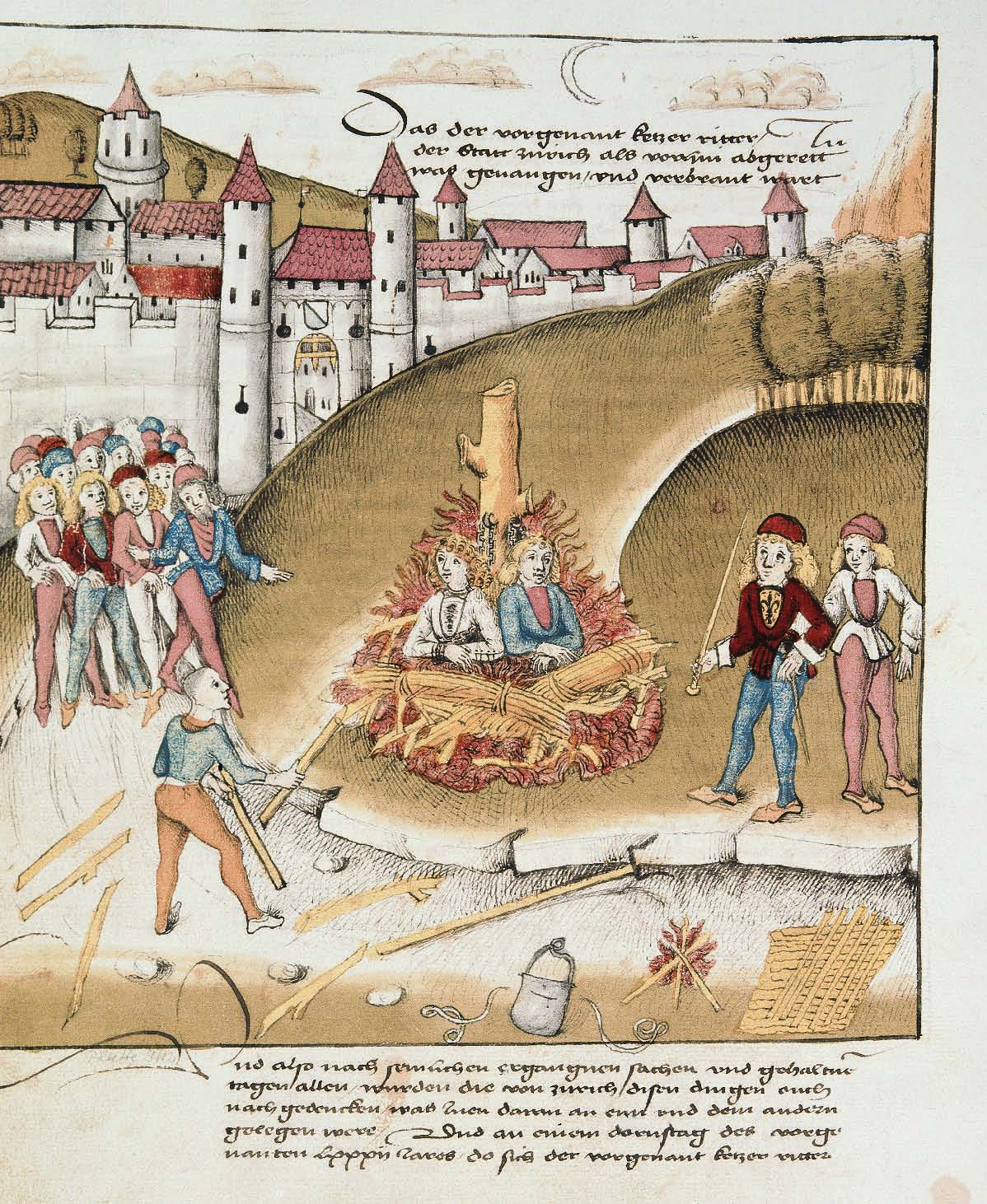
Burning of the accused sodomites Richard Puller von Hohenburg and his servant Anton Mätzler outside the walls of Zürich, 1482 (from the Spiezer Schilling chronicle)

==== BCE ====
The Middle Assyrian Law Codes (1075 BCE) state: If a man has intercourse with his brother-in-arms, they shall turn him into a eunuch. This is the earliest known law condemning the act of male-to-male intercourse in the military.

In the Roman Republic, the Lex Scantinia (which is first described in documents dating back to 50 BCE) imposed penalties on those who committed a sex crime (stuprum) against a freeborn male minor. The law may also have been used to prosecute male citizens who willingly played the passive role in same-sex acts. The law was mentioned in literary sources but enforced infrequently; Domitian revived it during his program of judicial and moral reform. It is unclear whether the penalty was death or a fine. For adult male citizens to experience and act on homoerotic desire was considered permissible, as long as their partner was a male of lower social standing.

==== CE ====
Intolerance of same-sex acts appears to have intensified in the Roman Empire in the late 4th century; in 390 the emperor Theodosius ordered that male prostitutes were to be publicly burned, although it is uncertain to what extent this decree was actually carried out.

Starting in the 1200s, the Roman Catholic Church launched a campaign against homosexual activity. Between the years 1250 and 1300, homosexual activity was criminalized in most of Europe, possibly even punishable by death.

In England, Henry VIII introduced the first legislation under English civil law against sodomy with the Buggery Act 1533 in 1533, making buggery punishable by death. This act provided the foundation for anti-sodomy laws that eventually were exported around the world under British colonial rule; out of 62 UN Member States the International Lesbian, Gay, Bisexual, Trans and Intersex Association found to be criminalizing homosexuality as of March 2023, more than 30 of them had kept the law from when they were under British colonial rule.

=== Decriminalization ===
Decriminalization of homosexuality by country or territory 1791–1850 1850–1945 1946–1989 1990–present Unknown date of legalization of same-sex intercourse Same-sex sexual intercourse always legal Still criminalized

In 1786 Pietro Leopoldo of Tuscany became the first ruler in the world to end the death penalty, including for the crime of sodomy. In France, the Penal Code of 1791 decriminalized sodomy; this was followed by the Napoleon Penal Code in 1810, which decriminalized sodomy in the part of continental Europe that had been conquered by France, which was most of it.

In 1830, Emperor Pedro I of Brazil signed a law into the Imperial Penal Code, eliminating all references to sodomy.

During the Ottoman Empire, homosexuality was decriminalized in 1858 as part of wider reforms during the Tanzimat period.

The death penalty for sodomy was not lifted in England and Wales until 1861.

In 1917, following the Bolshevik Revolution led by Vladimir Lenin and Leon Trotsky, Russia legalized homosexuality. However, when Joseph Stalin came to power in 1920s, these laws were reversed. Homosexuality remained effectively illegal until 1993, after the fall of the Soviet Union, when sodomy was once again decriminalized.

During the First Czechoslovak Republic (1918–1938), there was a movement to repeal sodomy laws. It has been claimed that this was the first campaign to repeal anti-gay laws that was spearheaded primarily by heterosexuals.

Lawrence v. Texas, 539 U.S. 558 (2003), is a landmark decision of the United States Supreme Court in which the Court ruled that U.S. state laws criminalizing sodomy between consenting adults are unconstitutional. (Note: The judgment does not recognize a constitutional right to certain sexual activities such as prostitution, bestiality, and incest, due to other metrics, such as the perceived inherent harm that these activities carry.) At the time of the Lawrence decision, ten states—Alabama, Florida, Idaho, Louisiana, Mississippi, North Carolina, South Carolina, Michigan, Utah, and Virginia—still banned consensual sodomy without respect to the sex of those involved, and four—Texas, Kansas, Oklahoma, and Missouri (partially)—prohibited same-sex couples from engaging in anal and oral sex.

==== Criminalization in modern days ====
As of 2025, sodomy-related laws have been repealed or judicially struck down in all of Europe, North America, and South America, except for Grenada, Guyana, Jamaica, and Saint Vincent and the Grenadines.

In Africa, male homosexual acts remain punishable by death in Mauritania and some parts of Nigeria and Somalia. Male and sometimes female homosexual acts are minor to major criminal offences in many other African countries; for example, life imprisonment is a prospective penalty in Tanzania, Uganda and Zambia. A notable exception is South Africa, where same-sex marriage is legal.

In Asia, male homosexual acts remain punishable by death in Afghanistan, Iran, Qatar, Saudi Arabia, the United Arab Emirates, and Yemen. Anti-sodomy laws have been repealed in Israel (which recognises but does not perform same-sex marriages), Japan, Kazakhstan, and Thailand.

Being LGBTI should be a crime	% Agree	% Disagree
Nigeria	59	23
Ghana	54	25
Pakistan	54	28
Uganda	53	31
Saudi Arabia	49	32
Jordan	47	31
Kenya	46	37
UAE	45	32
Egypt	44	35
Zimbabwe	44	33
Algeria	43	35
Iraq	43	35
Kazakhstan	41	45
Morocco	39	39
Indonesia	38	37
Malaysia	35	40
Turkey	31	48
India	31	50
Russia	28	55
Israel	24	59
Poland	23	53
Ukraine	22	56
South Africa	22	61
UK	22	61
Jamaica	20	47
Trinidad and Tobago	20	52
Philippines	20	59
China	20	59
Serbia	19	58
Bolivia	18	54
Dominican Republic	18	56
France	17	58
Vietnam	17	61
Peru	16	57
Australia	15	66
Netherlands	15	76
Nicaragua	14	56
Ecuador	14	59
Colombia	13	60
Venezuela	13	60
Chile	13	65
United States	13	65
Argentina	13	67
Canada	13	69
Spain	13	72
Japan	12	61
Mexico	12	62
Costa Rica	12	64
New Zealand	12	64
Ireland	12	73
Brazil	11	68
Italy	11	74
Croatia	9	72
Portugal	9	75

== Sodomy-related legal positions by country ==
=== Countries where same-sex sex is legal ===
==== Albania ====
On 20 January 1995 the Albanian Parliament legalized consensual same-sex sexual relations in Albania.

==== Andorra ====
Same-sex sexual activity is legal in Andorra. A law prohibiting same-sex sexual activity was abolished in 1791.

==== Angola ====
Angola legalized same-sex sexual activity in 2021.

==== Antigua and Barbuda ====
On 5 July 2022, the Eastern Caribbean Supreme Court ruled that sections of the Penal Code that made consensual same-sex intimacy illegal in Antigua and Barbuda were unconstitutional, and therefore void.

==== Argentina ====
Same-sex sexual activity was legalized in Argentina in 1887.

==== Armenia ====
Homosexual sex became legal in Armenia in 2003.

==== Australia ====
Upon colonisation in 1788, Australia inherited laws from the United Kingdom including the Buggery Act 1533. These were retained in the criminal codes passed by the various colonial parliaments during the 19th century, and by the state parliaments after Federation.

Male homosexual activity was legalized in South Australia on 2 October 1975 (there was a defense to a charge of male homosexual activity if both parties in were private and over 21 from 9 November 1972, but male homosexual activity offenses remained until the 1975 repeal), in the Australian Capital Territory on 8 November 1976, in Victoria on 1 March 1981, in the Northern Territory on 1 January 1984, in New South Wales on 8 June 1984, in Western Australia on 23 March 1990, in Queensland on 19 January 1991, and in Tasmania on 14 May 1997.

==== Austria ====
Homosexual sex was legalized in 1971 in Austria.

==== Azerbaijan ====
Azerbaijan regained its independence in 1991, and in 2000 repealed its Soviet-era anti-sodomy law.

==== The Bahamas ====
Same-sex relationships between consenting adults became legal in the Bahamas in 1991. However, the criminal code still requires a higher age of consent for homosexual acts. The legal age of consent to engage in sexual activity is 16 for straight couples and 18 for same-sex couples.

==== Bahrain ====
Homosexuality was decriminalized in Bahrain in 1976.

However, although no law explicitly criminalizes same-sex sex, authorities have used broadly-phrased penal code provisions against "indecency" and "immorality" or "debauchery" (Arabic: فجور, romanized: fujoor) to target people who have it.

==== Barbados ====
Before the December 2022 ruling by the Barbados High Court that struck down buggery and gross indecency laws in Barbados, same-sex and different-sex anal and oral sex were criminalised in Barbados under Chapter 154, Sections 9 and 12 of the Sexual Offences Act. Section 9 criminalised "buggery," regardless of whether the act was done in private and consensual, or whether it was done between two men or a man and a woman. Section 12 criminalised "serious indecency," which was defined as any act "involving the use of the genital organs for the purpose of arousing or gratifying sexual desire." Punishment for "buggery" was life imprisonment, while the maximum penalty for "serious indecency" was ten years in prison if the act was committed on or towards a person aged 16 or older.

==== Belarus ====
In 1994, homosexuality was decriminalized in Belarus.

==== Belgium ====
Same-sex sexual activity has been legal since 1795, when the country was a French possession.

==== Belize ====
Homosexual sex was decriminalized in Belize in 2016.

==== Benin ====
Homosexual sex is legal in Benin.

==== Bhutan ====
As amended in 2021, Section 213 of the Bhutan Penal Code states:

A defendant shall be guilty of the offence of unnatural sex, if the defendant engages in sexual conduct that is against the order of nature. However, homosexuality between adults shall not be considered unnatural sex.

Previously, the code said a defendant was guilty of unnatural sex "if the defendant engages in sodomy or any other sexual conduct that is against the order of nature."

==== Bolivia ====
Same-sex sexual activity has been legal in Bolivia since 1832.

==== Bosnia and Herzegovina ====
Bosnia and Herzegovina is a federation consisting of two entities, namely the Federation of Bosnia and Herzegovina and the Republika Srpska. Same-sex sexual activity was legalized in the Federation of Bosnia and Herzegovina in 1996 and in the Republika Srpska in 1998, by those two entities adopting their own criminal laws. The Brčko District followed suit and legalized homosexuality in 2003, making it legal nationwide since then.

==== Botswana ====
Same-sex sexual acts became legal in Botswana on 11 June 2019. Previously, sodomy, whether heterosexual or homosexual, was criminalised, punishable by up to seven years' imprisonment. The law criminalising such sexual activity applied to both men and women. Initially, its application was limited to men only (similar to other colonies of the British Empire), however, a Botswana court found this to be discriminatory and that the law should apply to women as well.

==== Brazil ====
During the Portuguese colonization of Brazil, homosexuality was illegal in the country between 1533 and 1830, due to the imposition of the Portuguese Penal Code, which was influenced by the British Buggery Act 1533. In 1830, eight years after the end of the Portuguese domain, sodomy laws were eliminated from the new Penal Code of Brazil.

==== Bulgaria ====
Homosexuality was legalized in Bulgaria in 1968.

==== Cambodia ====
Private, adult, non-commercial and consensual sexual activity between people of the same sex is legal in Cambodia, and was never criminalized in the history of the country.

==== Canada ====
Before 1859, the Province of Canada prosecuted sodomy under the English Buggery Act. In 1859, the Province of Canada enacted its own buggery law in the Consolidated Statutes of Canada as an offence punishable by death. Buggery remained punishable by death until 1869. A broader law targeting all homosexual male sexual activity ("gross indecency") was passed in 1892, as part of a larger update to the criminal law of the new dominion of Canada. Changes to the Criminal Code in 1948 and 1961 were used to brand gay men as "criminal sexual psychopaths" and "dangerous sexual offenders." These labels provided for indeterminate prison sentences. Most famously, George Klippert, a homosexual, was labelled a dangerous sexual offender and sentenced to life in prison, a sentence confirmed by the Supreme Court of Canada in 1967. He was released in July 1971.

Sodomy was decriminalized after the Criminal Law Amendment Act, 1968-69 (Bill C-150) received royal assent on 27 June 1969. The offences of buggery and "gross indecency" were still in force; however, the new act introduced exemptions for married couples and any two consenting adults above the age of 21, regardless of gender or sexual orientation. The bill had been originally introduced in the House of Commons in 1967 by then Minister of Justice Pierre Trudeau, who famously stated that "there's no place for the state in the bedrooms of the nation".

Revisions to the Criminal Code in 1987 repealed the offence of "gross indecency", changed "buggery" to "anal intercourse" and reduced the age exemption from 21 to 18. Section 159 of the Criminal Code continued to criminalize anal sex in general, with exemptions (provided no more than two people are present) for husbands and wives, and two consenting parties above the age of 18.

Subsequent case law held that section 159 was unconstitutional; thus, anal sex was de facto legal between any two or more consenting persons above the age of consent (14). In the 1995 Court of Appeal for Ontario case R. v. M. (C.) the judges ruled that the law was unconstitutional on the basis that the specific exemptions based on marital status and age infringed on the equality rights guaranteed by section 15 of the Charter of Rights and Freedoms, and constituted discrimination based on sexual orientation. A similar decision was made by the Quebec Court of Appeal in the 1998 case R. v. Roy. In a 2002 decision regarding a case in which three people were engaged in sexual intercourse, the Court of Queen's Bench of Alberta declared section 159 in its entirety to be null, including the provisions criminalizing anal sex when more than two persons are taking part or present.

NDP MP Joe Comartin introduced private member's bills in 2007 and 2011 to repeal section 159 of the Criminal Code; however, neither passed first reading.

In June 2019, C-75 passed both houses of the Parliament of Canada and received royal assent, repealing section 159 effective immediately and making the age of consent equal at 16 for all individuals.

==== Cape Verde ====
Cape Verde decriminalized same-sex sexual activity in 2004.

==== The Cayman Islands ====
Same-sex sex was decriminalized in the Cayman Islands in 2001.

==== The Central African Republic ====
Homosexuality has never been criminalized in the Central African Republic.

==== Chile ====
Consensual sex between two same-sex adults was decriminalized in 1999, but with a higher age of consent set at 18. Since August 2022, the age of consent was equalised to 14 with heterosexuals under a recently implemented law.

==== China ====
Sodomy was never explicitly criminalized in China, but private sex between unmarried people was illegal until 1997, and same-sex marriage is not legal in China. The Chinese Supreme Court ruled in 1957 that voluntary sodomy was not a criminal act.

===== Hong Kong =====
In Hong Kong sex between men in private was legalized for those 21 years or older in 1991. However, an unequal age of consent was established (21 for gay men and 16 for heterosexuals) with the law remaining silent about lesbianism. LGBT rights groups lobbied the Legislative Council to equalise the age of consent law, but were told by conservative lawmakers that the legal inequality was necessary to protect youth and preserve tradition. A lawsuit was initiated to challenge the unequal age of consent in court.

In 2005, Justice Hartmann found that the unequal age of consent was unconstitutional under the Bill of Rights Ordinance, violating the right to equality. The ruling was upheld by the Court of Appeal, but the provisions were not formally removed from the Crimes Ordinance (Cap. 200), making the age of consent for gay sex 16 (like heterosexual sex) until 2014.

On 30 May 2019, in the Yeung Chu Wing v Secretary for Justice case, the High Court ruled in favour of Yeung Chu-wing, an LGBT activist who brought the lawsuit against the government in 2017, and struck down four further provisions under the Crimes Ordinance (Cap. 200) imposing higher penalties for offences committed by homosexual men. Three further provisions were remedially interpreted such that they would no longer discriminate against homosexuals. It abolished the crimes of "procuring others to commit homosexual buggery" and "gross indecency with or by a man under 16". He also overturned "gross indecency by a man with a man otherwise than in private" and "procuring gross indecency by a man with a man". The three offences that now apply to both genders are "homosexual buggery with or by a man under 16", "gross indecency by a man with a male mentally incapacitated person", and "permitting a young person to resort to or be on a premises or vessel for intercourse, prostitution, buggery or homosexual acts". This comes after 20 years of activism to change these laws, in which the government either refused or delayed; the secretary for justice during the trial, however, conceded to nearly all the changes, and agreed that these laws targeting gay men are incompatible with the Basic Law.

==== Colombia ====
Homosexuality was decriminalized in Colombia in 1981.

==== Cook Islands ====
Homosexuality was decriminalized in the Cook Islands by an act of Parliament on 1 June 2023. Prior to that, male homosexual activity was illegal in the Cook Islands under the Crimes Act 1969. Consensual male sodomy was punishable by up to seven years' imprisonment, while indecency between males was punishable by up to five years' imprisonment. The law was inherited from the former British Empire. Prosecutions were rare, however.

==== Costa Rica ====
Homosexuality has been legal in Costa Rica since 1971.

==== Croatia ====
Same-sex sexual activity was legalized in Croatia in 1977 setting the age of consent at 18 for homosexuals and 14 for heterosexuals. The age of consent was then equalized in 1998 when it was set at 14 by the Croatian Penal Code for everyone, and later raised to 15 with the introduction of a new Penal Code on 1 January 2013. There is an exemption to this rule if the age difference between the partners is three years or less.

==== Cuba ====
Private, non-commercial sexual relations between same-sex consenting adults 16 and over have been legal in Cuba since 1979.

==== Cyprus ====
Cyprus decriminalized homosexuality in 1998.

==== The Czech Republic ====
Homosexuality has been decriminalized in the Czech Republic since 1962.

==== Democratic Republic of the Congo ====
Same-sex sexual activity is legal in the Democratic Republic of the Congo. Age of consent is equal, regardless of sex.

==== Denmark ====
In 1933, Denmark decriminalized homosexuality.

==== Djibouti ====
There is no law in Djibouti that mentions that same-sex sexual activity is illegal; however, the authorities can prosecute the public display of same-sex sexual conduct under laws prohibiting attacks on “good morals".

==== Dominica ====
In April 2024, the High Court of Dominica ruled that sections 14 and 16 of the Sexual Offences Act, that criminalised consensual same-sex activity between adults, were unconstitutional.

Prior to that ruling, both male and female types of same-sex sexual activity were illegal in Dominica, as was anal intercourse between persons of the opposite sex.

==== Dominican Republic ====
Consensual same-sex sexual acts between adults in private have been legal in the Dominican Republic since 1822 and the age of consent is set equally at 18 years of age.

In 2025, the Constitutional Court struck down provisions of the 1966 Police Justice Code and the Armed Forces Justice Code which prohibited same-sex sexual activity among servicemembers, with penalties up to six months.

==== Ecuador ====
Same-sex sexual activity has been legal in Ecuador since 1997 when the Constitutional Tribunal, in Case No. 111-97-TC, overturned the first paragraph of Article 516 of the Penal Code, which criminalized sexual activities between persons of the same sex. In 2014, a new Organic Integral Penal Code (2014) entered into force, which did not include the criminalizing provisions previously overturned.

==== El Salvador ====
There are no sodomy laws in El Salvador.

==== Estonia ====
Same-sex sexual activity between consenting males, which until 1917 had been illegal in the former Russian Empire, was formally legalised in the newly independent Republic of Estonia when the country's parliament approved changes in the criminal code in 1929. It came into force in 1935. Before the adoption of the new criminal law, the criminal and correctional penal code of Imperial Russia was observed.

In Soviet-occupied Estonia, same-sex sexual activity between males was a criminal offense under paragraph 118 of the penal code. At least 67 court cases and 155 men convicted under the law are known. After Estonia restored its independence on 20 August 1991, it was made legal again on 1 June 1992. This only removed the punishment for consensual same-sex sexual activity, with the paragraph itself being removed in 2001, with the adoption of a new penal code. This makes Estonia one of the few countries to have legalised same-sex sexual activity twice.

==== Equatorial Guinea ====
There are no laws against homosexuality in Equatorial Guinea.

==== Fiji ====
Since 1 February 2010, private, adult, consensual and non-commercial male and female homosexual conduct has been legal under the Crimes Decree 2009.

==== Finland ====
Homosexual sex has been legal in Finland since 1971.

==== France ====
In France, the Penal Code of 1791 decriminalized sodomy; this was followed by the Napoleon Penal Code in 1810, which decriminalized sodomy in the part of continental Europe that had been conquered by France, which was most of it.

A less known discriminative law was adopted in 1960, inserting into the Penal Code (article 330, 2nd alinea) a clause that doubled the penalty for indecent exposure for homosexual activity. This ordonnance was intended to repress pimping. The clause against homosexuality was adopted due to a wish of Parliament, as follows:

This ordonnance was adopted by the executive after it was authorised by Parliament to take legislative measures against national scourges such as alcoholism. Paul Mirguet, a Member of the National Assembly, felt that homosexuality was also a scourge, and thus proposed a sub-amendment, therefore known as the Mirguet amendment, tasking the Government to enact measures against homosexuality, which was adopted.

This Article 330 alinea 2 was repealed in 1980 as part of an act redefining several sexual offenses.

In 1982, under president François Mitterrand, the law from 1942 (Vichy France) making the age of consent for homosexual sex higher (18) than for heterosexual sex (15) was also repealed, despite the vocal opposition of Jean Foyer in the National Assembly.

==== Gabon ====
On 23 June 2020, the National Assembly of Gabon approved the government's bill to decriminalize same-sex sexual activity. It was approved by the Senate on 29 June, and signed by President Ali Bongo on 7 July 2020.

==== Georgia ====
In 2000, the country of Georgia decriminalized homosexuality.

==== Germany ====
Paragraph 175, which punished sex between men, was enacted in 1871 and repealed in 1994. In 1935, the Nazis broadened the law so that the courts could pursue any "lewd act" whatsoever, even one involving no physical contact, such as masturbating next to each other. Furthermore, the Gestapo could transport suspected offenders to concentration camps without any legal justification at all (even if they had been acquitted or already served their sentence in jail). Thus, over 10,000 homosexual men were forced into concentration camps, where they were identified by the pink triangle. The majority of them died there.

In 1945, after the concentration camps were liberated, some homosexual prisoners were recalled to custody to serve out their two-year sentence under Paragraph 175. In 1950, East Germany abolished Nazi amendments to Paragraph 175, whereas West Germany kept them and even had them confirmed by its Constitutional Court. In 1969, the government eased Paragraph 175 by providing for an age of consent of 21. The age of consent was lowered to 18 in 1973, and finally, in 1994, the paragraph was repealed and the age of consent lowered to 16, the same that is in force for heterosexual acts. East Germany had already reformed its more lenient version of the paragraph in 1968, and repealed it in 1988.

==== Greece ====
Following the country's independence from the Ottoman Empire, the penal code of 1834 stipulated that anyone guilty of sodomy would be punished with at least one year imprisonment and police surveillance. Male homosexual practice was decriminalized in 1951. Lesbians were not mentioned or acknowledged in the Greek Criminal Code. The Penal Code outlawed male prostitution and provided for a higher age of consent of 17 for male homosexual acts. However, this provision was abolished resulting in equalization of the age of consent at 15 and the legalization of male prostitution, subject to existing laws on the regulation of prostitution.

==== Guatemala ====
Homosexuality was legalized in Guatemala in 1871.

==== Guinea-Bissau ====
The Penal Code which remained in force after Guinea-Bissau’s independence from Portugal was repealed in 1993 with the enactment of a new Code (Law-decree No. 4/93) which contains no provisions criminalizing consensual same-sex sexual acts between adults.

==== Haiti ====
The French Penal Code of 1791, adopted between 25 September and 6 October 1791, extended to Saint-Domingue. When Haiti became independent from France in 1804, no law that criminalized consensual same-sex sexual acts was introduced, and no such law has come into the penal code since.

==== Honduras ====
Since 1899, homosexuality has been legal in Honduras.

==== Hungary ====
Homosexuality in Hungary was decriminalized in 1962, Paragraph 199 of the Hungarian Penal Code from then on threatened "only" adults over 20 who engaged themselves in a consensual same-sex relationship with an underaged person between 14 and 20. Then in 1978 the age was lowered to 18. Since 2002, the ruling of the Constitutional Court of Hungary has repealed Paragraph 199 – thus providing an equal age of consent of 14, regardless of sexual orientation or gender. Since 1996, the Unregistered Cohabitation Act 1995 was provided for any couple, regardless of gender or sexual orientation and from 1 July 2009 the Registered Partnership Act 2009 has become effective, and provides a registered partnership just for same-sex couples – since the opposite-sex already have marriage, to avoid duplication.

==== Iceland ====
Section 178 of the Penal Code of Iceland criminalized same-sex relations in Iceland between 1869 and 1940. In 1992, the age of consent was set at 14, and in 2007 it was raised to 15, regardless of gender and sexual orientation.

==== India ====
On 2 July 2009, in the case of Naz Foundation v National Capital Territory of Delhi, the High Court of Delhi struck down much of S. 377 of the IPC, which criminalized various sexual acts, as being unconstitutional. On 11 December 2013, the Supreme Court of India overturned the ruling in Naz Foundation v. National Capital Territory of Delhi, effectively re-criminalizing homosexual activity until action was taken by parliament. However, on 12 July 2018, a Constitution bench of the Supreme Court of India started hearing a review petition over its 2013 judgment. On 6 September 2018, in Navtej Singh Johar v. Union of India, the Supreme Court struck down the part of S. 377 criminalizing consensual homosexual activities. It upheld that other aspects of S. 377 criminalizing unnatural sex with minors and animals will remain in force.

==== Ireland ====
In the Republic of Ireland, the Criminal Law (Sexual Offences) Act 1993 abolished the offence of "buggery between persons". For some years prior to 1993, criminal prosecution had not been made for buggery between consenting adults. The 1993 Act created an offence of "buggery with a person under the age of 17 years", penalised similar to statutory rape, which also had 17 years as the age of consent. The Criminal Law (Sexual Offences) Act 2006 replaced this offence with "defilement of a child", encompassing both "sexual intercourse" and "buggery". Buggery with an animal is still unlawful under Section 69 of the Sexual Offences Act 2003. In 2012, a man was convicted of this offence for supplying a dog in 2008 to a woman who had intercourse with it and died; he received a suspended sentence and was required to sign the sex offender registry, ending his career as a bus driver.

==== Israel ====
The newly formed government of Israel continued in British tradition with enforcing their laws regarding the criminalization of homosexual relationships as well as other acts that the government deemed immoral or unnatural which included acts of gender fluidity.

In 1953, the Attorney General of Israel, Haim Cohn, issued a directive ordering the police to refrain from enforcing the law against homosexual acts between consenting adults. The Israeli Supreme Court likewise ruled in 1963 that the law should not be applied to acts between consenting adults in private. The ban on consensual same-sex sexual acts was formally repealed by the Knesset in 1988 by omitting it from the criminal code.

==== Italy ====
In 1786 Pietro Leopoldo of Tuscany became the first ruler in the world to end the death penalty, including for the crime of sodomy. Same-sex activity has been legal nationwide since 1890, with an equal age of consent;
previously it was made legal in Tuscany since 1853 (as the Grand Duchy of Tuscany), in Sicily since 1819 (as the Kingdom of the Two Sicilies), and in Naples since 1810 (as the Kingdom of Naples).

==== The Ivory Coast ====
Homosexuality is legal and has never been criminalized within the Ivory Coast.

==== Japan ====
Sodomy was first criminalized in Japan in 1873, in the early Meiji era. But this provision was repealed only seven years later by the Penal Code of 1880 in accordance with the Napoleonic Penal Code. Since June 2023, the age of consent has been set at 16 years.

==== Jordan ====
Jordan decriminalized homosexuality in 1951.

==== Kazakhstan ====
Both male and female same-sex sexual activity have been legal in Kazakhstan since late 1997, when under the revised criminal code same-sex relations between consenting adults was no longer a criminal offence.

==== Kosovo ====
In 1858, the Ottoman Empire, then in control of Kosovo, legalized same-sex intercourse. The Yugoslav Criminal Code of 1929, which included Kosovo, banned "lewdness against the order of nature" (anal intercourse). The Socialist Federal Republic of Yugoslavia, which included Kosovo, also restricted the offense to same-sex anal intercourse, with the maximum sentence reduced to 1 to 2 years' imprisonment in 1959. In 1994, male same-sex sexual intercourse became legal in the Autonomous Province of Kosovo and Metohija when it was a part of the Federal Republic of Yugoslavia, and since Kosovo became independent in 2008 same-sex sexual intercourse is legal there.

==== Kyrgyzstan ====
Same-sex sexual activity was decriminalized in Kyrgyzstan in 1998.

==== Laos ====
Same-sex sexual activity is legal in Laos, and has not ever been criminalized.

==== Latvia ====
In 1992, male homosexuality was decriminalized in Latvia; female homosexuality was never criminalized there.

==== Lesotho ====
In 2012, male same-sex activity was legalized in Lesotho. Female homosexuality was already not illegal in Lesotho.

==== Liechtenstein ====
Liechtenstein decriminalized homosexuality in 1989.

==== Lithuania ====
Lithuania decriminalized homosexuality in 1993.

==== Luxembourg ====
Same-sex sexual activity was decriminalised in 1794, when the country was a French possession. Article 372 of the Penal Code sets the age of consent to 16, regardless of sexual orientation or gender. This was increased to 18 for same-sex sexual activity in 1971 by the addition of article 372 to the Penal Code, which was repealed in 1992.

==== Macau ====
Same-sex sexual activity was legalized in Macau in 1996.

==== Madagascar ====
Homosexuality is legal in Madagascar.

==== Malta ====
Same-sex sexual activity has been legal in Malta since January 1973. The age of consent is equal regardless of sexual orientation or gender at 16 years of age.

==== The Marshall Islands ====
Homosexuality was decriminalized in the Marshall Islands in 2005.

==== Mauritius ====
Consensual sodomy was decriminalized by the Supreme Court of Mauritius in a decision dated 4 October 2023.

Previously, Section 250(1) of the Mauritius Criminal Code of 1838 held that "Any person who is guilty of the crime of sodomy ... shall be liable to penal servitude for a term not exceeding 5 years." Under the Supreme Court's 2023 judgement, the section should "be read so as to exclude such consensual acts from [its] ambit."

==== Mexico ====
Mexico decriminalized same-sex sexual acts in 1871.

==== Micronesia ====
Homosexuality was decriminalized in Micronesia in 1982.

==== Moldova ====
Moldova decriminalized homosexuality in 1995.

==== Monaco ====
Same-sex sexual activity is legal. Criminal penalties for homosexual acts were eliminated in 1793 due to the adoption of French laws.

==== Mongolia ====
All mentions of homosexuality were removed from the Mongolian Criminal Code in 1993, effectively legalizing private and consensual same-sex sexual activity. The age of consent is 16, regardless of sexual orientation.

==== Montenegro ====
Montenegro decriminalized same-sex sexual activity in 1977.

==== Mozambique ====
Mozambique decriminalized homosexuality in 2015.

==== Namibia ====
The High Court of Namibia in Windhoek ruled that Namibia's common law crimes of “sodomy” and “unnatural sexual offences” were unconstitutional and invalid on 21 June 2024. The court also ruled on the same day that the inclusion of references to the crime of sodomy in the Criminal Procedure Act, Immigration Act, and Defense Act were similarly unconstitutional and invalid.

==== Nauru ====
Nauru decriminalized homosexuality in 2016.

==== Nepal ====
Before the transition from the Kingdom of Nepal to the Federal Democratic Republic of Nepal in 2007, private homosexual relations between consenting adults was a crime. Article 1 of Chapter 16 of the National Code (1963), locally referred to as "Muluki Ain", criminalized “unnatural sexual intercourse”. But in 2007, the Supreme Court of Nepal ruled that same-sex sexual intercourse was not to be construed as “unnatural”. While the new Criminal Codes Act (2008), which replaced the Muluki Ain, appears to continue to criminalize “unnatural sex”, it should be read in light of this case.

The age of consent in Nepal is 18, regardless of gender and sexual orientation.

==== The Netherlands ====
Homosexuality is legal in the Netherlands.

==== New Zealand ====
Male homosexual intercourse was first criminalized in New Zealand when New Zealand adopted England's law with the English Law Act 1858 and adopted British law making "buggery" a crime with a maximum sentence of death. (In practice, New Zealand used the death penalty only for offences of murder and once for treason before abolishment in 1961). In 1861, Britain replaced the death penalty for buggery with life imprisonment and New Zealand enacted similar legislation six years later. In 1893, the law in New Zealand was broadened to outlaw any sexual activity between men. Penalties included life imprisonment, hard labour and flogging. Sex between women was never criminalised in New Zealand.

In 1986 homosexual sexual activity between men was legalized in New Zealand, with the age of consent set at 16, the same as for heterosexuals.

==== Nicaragua ====
Homosexuality was decriminalized in Nicaragua in 2008.

==== North Korea ====
The 1950 criminal code (amended 2009) does not explicitly criminalize same-sex sexual activity. However, articles 193 and 262 of the amended criminal code outlaw the creation, distribution and possession of "decadent" culture and sexually explicit media as well as engaging in "obscene" activities.

In 2011, The Korea Times, a South Korean publication, reported that North Korea had executed a lesbian couple, a North Korean woman and Japanese woman, for being influenced by capitalism and "bringing corruption of public morals". In the article, the source was Free North Korea Radio, itself a project of the Defense Forum Foundation, a U.S. government sponsored nonprofit organization. In 2023, the South Korean Ministry of Unification published a 584-page report "North Korean Human Rights Report". According to the report, defector testimony alleged that at least one male detainee in a detention camp was secretly executed for homosexuality in 2014.

==== North Macedonia ====
Homosexuality was outlawed in North Macedonia until 1996, when the country decriminalized sex between people of the same sex as a condition for becoming a member of the Council of Europe.

==== Norway ====
Same-sex sexual intercourse between men has been legal in Norway since 1972.

==== Palau ====
In April 2014, the President signed into law the new Penal Code, which does not contain provisions outlawing consensual sexual activity between people of the same sex.

==== Panama ====
Homosexuality was decriminalized in Panama in 2008.

==== Paraguay ====
Homosexuality is legal in Paraguay.

==== Peru ====
Peru decriminalized homosexuality in 1924.

==== The Philippines ====
Non-commercial, private, consensual sexual activity between people of the same-sex is legal in the Philippines. The age of consent law is set at the legally and equally restricted permissible minimum age of 16 years for all individuals from that age and others above that age as well, regardless of sexual orientation and gender identity. However, any form of sexual conduct or affection that occurs in public may be subject to the "grave scandal" prohibition in Article 200 of the Revised Penal Code, which states: "ARTICLE 200. Grave Scandal.—The penalties of arresto mayor and public censure shall be imposed upon any person who shall offend against decency or good customs by any highly scandalous conduct not expressly falling within any other article of this Code."

==== Poland ====
During the Partitions of Poland (1795–1918) and the German occupation of Poland (1939–1945), laws prohibiting homosexuality were imposed on some territories that make up the modern Polish state. A notable exception was the Napoleonic Code, which was introduced in 1808 and decriminalized homosexuality in parts of Poland until it was overturned by a Tsarist decree in 1835.

Following World War I, same-sex activity continued to be formally criminalized in now-independent Poland, because the penal codes of the Russian Empire, the Kingdom of Prussia and the Austria-Hungarian Empire remained in power. They mostly criminalized male same-sex acts, though the Austrian code included broader provisions against so-called "same-sex fornication" and was also used against women.

The new Polish Penal Code of 1932 (Kodeks karny) decriminalized consensual same-sex acts.

In 1948 during the Polish People's Republic, age of consent was set to 15, equal to that of heterosexual partners.

==== Portugal ====
During the period of the Portuguese Inquisition, female homosexual activity was not actively prosecuted due to a 1645 ruling; one of the few cases of prosecuting a woman (Maria Duran) for same-sex sexual activity came in 1741, but she was prosecuted for causing distress to her sexual partners, not for her activity. Same-sex sexual activity was first decriminalised in 1852, under Mary II and Ferdinand II of the Kingdom of Portugal, but it was made a crime again in 1886, under Louis I, and Portugal gradually became more oppressive of homosexuals until and throughout the dictatorship years. It was not until 1982 that same-sex sexual activity was decriminalised again, and the age of consent was equalized with heterosexual activity in 2007.

==== Republic of the Congo ====
Same-sex relationships have been legal in the Republic of the Congo since 1940. The text of the 1940 Penal Code, as amended in 2006, only prohibits same-sex sexual behavior with a person younger than 21 years. There is an unequal age of consent however, with it being 18 for opposite-sex sexual activity.

==== Romania ====
Homosexual sex was legalized in Romania in 2002.

==== Russia ====
Same-sex sexual activity has been legal since 1993 for consenting men and was not criminalized for women.

==== Rwanda ====
Homosexual sex is legal in Rwanda.

==== Saint Kitts and Nevis ====
Following a ruling of the Eastern Caribbean Supreme Court on August 29, 2022, consensual same-sex intercourse between adults in private is no longer illegal in Saint Kitts and Nevis.

Previously, Sections 56 and 57 of the "Offences Against the Person Act" criminalized same-sex sexual activity. The Court ruled that the sections violated the Saint Kitts and Nevis constitutional provisions guaranteeing a right to privacy and freedom of expression. The ruling had immediate effect.

In 2011, the government of St. Kitts and Nevis said it had no mandate from the people to abolish the criminalization of homosexuality among consenting adults. However, despite the existence of the law on the books, there had been no known prosecution of same-sex sexual activity, according to the government.

==== Saint Lucia ====
Same-sex sexual activity was illegal for males in Saint Lucia until July 29, 2025, when the Eastern Caribbean Supreme Court struck down colonial-era laws against buggery and gross indecency as unconstitutional.

==== San Marino ====
San Marino decriminalized homosexuality in 2004.

==== São Tomé and Príncipe ====
São Tomé and Príncipe decriminalized homosexuality in 2012.

==== Serbia ====
Homosexuality in Serbia was first criminalized from 1860 and remained so through various regimes, until its first decriminalization in the Socialist Autonomous Province of Vojvodina in 1977. When Vojvodina was reintroduced fully into the Republic of Serbia legal system during the breakout of Yugoslavia, it was recriminalized again, until 1994, when it was decriminalized in the entire Serbia.

==== Seychelles ====
Seychelles decriminalized homosexuality in 2016.

==== Singapore ====
Section 377A of the Singapore Penal Code, introduced during British colonial rule, criminalized "outrage of decency" and additionally punished commission, solicitation, or attempted male same-sex "gross indecency" with "imprisonment of up to two years".

Section 377 was added by the British in 1858 for its colonies. The law was inherited into Singapore in 1871, with 377A introduced into the Penal Code in 1938. In October 2007, during a Penal Code review, Singapore repealed Section 377 of the Penal Code, but 377A remained on the books as an unenforced law. On 29 November 2022, the Parliament of Singapore voted to repeal Section 377A in its entirety. It was officially repealed on 3 January 2023 and struck off the books.

==== Slovakia ====
Slovakia decriminalized homosexuality in 1962.

==== Slovenia ====
Slovenia decriminalized homosexuality in 1977.

==== South Africa ====
The common-law crimes of sodomy and "commission of an unnatural sexual act" in South Africa's Roman-Dutch law were declared to be unconstitutional (and therefore invalid) by the Witwatersrand Local Division of the High Court on 8 May 1998 in the case of National Coalition for Gay and Lesbian Equality v Minister of Justice, and this judgment was confirmed by the Constitutional Court on 9 October of the same year. The ruling applied retroactively to acts committed since the adoption of the Interim Constitution on 27 April 1994.

Despite the abolition of sodomy as a crime, the Sexual Offences Act, 1957 set the age of consent for same-sex activities at 19, whereas for opposite-sex activities it was 16. This was rectified by the Criminal Law (Sexual Offences and Related Matters) Amendment Act, 2007, which comprehensively reformed the law on sex offences to make it gender- and orientation-neutral, and set 16 as the uniform age of consent. In 2008, even though the new law had come into effect, the former inequality was retrospectively declared to be unconstitutional in the case of Geldenhuys v National Director of Public Prosecutions.

==== Spain ====
Homosexuality is legal in Spain.

==== Suriname ====
Same-sex sexual activity has been legal in Suriname since 1869.

==== Sweden ====
Sweden legalised same-sex sexual activity in 1867, with the age of consent set at 18. In 1987, in order to combat the spread of HIV, the Riksdag passed a law against sex in gay saunas and against prostitution, but it was repealed in 2004. Bestiality was legalized in 1944, but it was again criminalized in 2014. The relevant legal provision is today found in Chapter 2, 10 § of the Swedish Animal Welfare Act of 2018: "It is forbidden to perform sexual acts with animals. The prohibition does not cover acts performed for veterinary reasons or in connection with breeding or for similar legitimate reasons." Violations of this provision are punishable with a fine or with imprisonment for a maximum of two years (Chapter 10, 2 § of the above Act).

==== Switzerland ====
Homosexuality was decriminalized in some places within Switzerland before 1942, but not in all Switzerland until 1942.

==== Taiwan ====
Explicit prohibitions of "consenting ji jian (雞姦; sodomy)" were abolished around 1912, when the Republic of China was established. The criminal code contained no provisions prohibiting consensual same-sex sexual activity between adults. Despite the decriminalization, LGBT people were often harassed and detained under general public order laws. These laws were repealed during the transition to democracy in 1991.

==== Tajikistan ====
Same-sex sexual activity has been legal in Tajikistan since May 1998.

The age of consent in Tajikistan is 16, regardless of gender or sexual orientation.

==== Thailand ====
Anti-sodomy legislation was repealed in Thailand in 1956.

==== Timor-Leste ====
Timor-Leste decriminalized homosexuality in 1975.

==== Trinidad and Tobago ====
Prior to 2018, when these provisions were struck down by a court, Section 13 of the Sexual Offences Act 1986 (strengthened in 2000) criminalised "buggery", with 25 years imprisonment. The law punished oral and anal sex between heterosexuals as well.

In March 2025, the Court of Appeal overturned the ruling that decriminalized buggery, but replaced its penalty with a maximum 5-year sentence. In the same judgement, the court reinstated section 61 of the Offences Against the Person Act 1925, maintaining legal prohibitions against acts of gross indecency with a penalty of up to two years of imprisonment. In November 2026, the Judicial Committee of the Privy Council, which acts as the 'supreme' court for Trinidad and Tobago, overturned the 2025 ruling. This means that same-sex sexual activity is now fully legalised.

==== Turkey ====
In Turkey, homosexual acts had already been decriminalized by its predecessor state, the Ottoman Empire, in 1858.

==== Ukraine ====
Male homosexual sex was legalized in Ukraine in 1991; female homosexual sex was never a crime there.

==== United Kingdom ====
In England, Henry VIII introduced the first legislation under English civil law against sodomy with the Buggery Act 1533 in 1533, making buggery punishable by death. The Act was the country's first civil sodomy law because such offenses had previously been dealt with by the ecclesiastical courts. While it was repealed in 1553 on the accession of Mary I, it was re-enacted in 1563 under Elizabeth I. James Pratt and John Smith were the last two to be executed for sodomy in the United Kingdom in 1835.

The official punishment for those convicted remained the death penalty until 1861 in England and Wales, and 1887 in Scotland, though it was not used for sodomy in England after 1835, or for sodomy between adults during the 1800s in Scotland.

Section 11 of the Criminal Law Amendment Act 1885 of the United Kingdom stated, "Any male person who, in public or private, commits, or is a party to the commission of, or procures or attempts to procure the commission by any male person of, any act of gross indecency with another male person, shall be guilty of a misdemeanor, and being convicted thereof shall be liable at the discretion of the court to be imprisoned for any term not exceeding two years, with or without hard labour."

The Sexual Offences Act 1967 (c. 60) is an act of Parliament in the United Kingdom. It legalized homosexual acts in England and Wales, on the condition that they were consensual, in private and between two men who had attained the age of 21.

Same-sex sexual activities were legalized in Scotland on the same basis as in the 1967 Act, by section 80 of the Criminal Justice (Scotland) Act 1980, which came into force on 1 February 1981.

Dudgeon v United Kingdom (1981) was a European Court of Human Rights (ECtHR) case, which held that Section 11 of the Criminal Law Amendment Act 1885, which criminalized male homosexual acts in England, Wales and Northern Ireland, breached the defendant's rights under Article 8 of the European Convention on Human Rights. The relevant decriminalizing legislation was an Order in Council, the Homosexual Offences (Northern Ireland) Order 1982.

==== United States ====
Sodomy laws in the United States were largely a matter of state rather than federal jurisdiction, except for laws governing the US Armed Forces. Illinois became the first American jurisdiction to repeal its law against consensual sodomy in 1961; in 1962, the Model Penal Code recommended all states do so.

Bowers v. Hardwick, 478 U.S. 186 (1986), was a landmark decision of the U.S. Supreme Court that upheld, in a 5–4 ruling, the constitutionality of a Georgia sodomy law criminalizing oral and anal sex in private between consenting adults, in this case with respect to homosexual sodomy, though the law did not differentiate between homosexual and heterosexual sodomy. Lawrence v. Texas, 539 U.S. 558 (2003), is a landmark decision of the United States Supreme Court in which the Court ruled that U.S. state laws criminalizing sodomy between consenting adults are unconstitutional. (Note: The judgment does not recognize a constitutional right to certain sexual activities such as prostitution, bestiality, and incest, due to other metrics, such as the perceived inherent harm that these activities carry.) At the time of the Lawrence decision, ten states—Alabama, Florida, Idaho, Louisiana, Mississippi, North Carolina, South Carolina, Michigan, Utah, and Virginia—still banned consensual sodomy without respect to the sex of those involved, and four—Texas, Kansas, Oklahoma, and Missouri (partially)—prohibited same-sex couples from engaging in anal and oral sex.

The Court of Appeals for the Armed Forces has ruled that the Lawrence v. Texas decision applies to Article 125 of the Uniform Code of Military Justice, which is a ban on sodomy in the US Armed Forces. In both United States v. Stirewalt and United States v. Marcum, the court ruled that the "conduct falls within the liberty interest identified by the Supreme Court", but went on to say that despite the application of Lawrence to the military, Article 125 can still be upheld in cases where there are "factors unique to the military environment" that would place the conduct "outside any protected liberty interest recognized in Lawrence." Examples of such factors could be fraternization, public sexual behavior, or any other factors that would adversely affect good order and discipline. Convictions for consensual sodomy have been overturned in military courts under the Lawrence precedent in both United States v. Meno. and United States v. Bullock. As of 2024, 12 states still had laws against consensual sodomy; in 2013, police in East Baton Rouge Parish, Louisiana, arrested gay men for "attempted crimes against nature" despite the law having been ruled unconstitutional and unenforceable.

==== Uruguay ====
Same-sex sexual activity was decriminalized in Uruguay in 1934.

==== Vanuatu ====
Same-sex sexual activity is legal in Vanuatu. Since the Penal Code (Amendment) Act 2006 commenced in 2007, the age of consensual sex in Vanuatu has been 15 years regardless of sex or sexual orientation.

==== Vatican City ====
Since 1890, the territory of what is now Vatican City has had no criminal laws against non-commercial, private, adult and consensual same-sex sexual activity.

==== Venezuela ====
Homosexuality has never been punishable since Venezuelan independence, Venezuela being together with Bolivia the only two countries in South America that have not criminalized homosexuality since their formation as sovereign states. However, within the framework of the "law on lazy people and thugs" (pre-criminal behavior laws as in Europe and Latin America during the 20th century) the situation changed slightly. In Venezuela, unlike Spain, this law did not expressly refer to homosexuals, although it was occasionally applied to homosexuals, transgender and/or transsexuals who practiced prostitution, as well as to sex workers in general, as reported by Amnesty International. People subjected to this legislation by "administrative acts" could be placed under "reeducation programs" in "special places of confinement" without trial, as also happened in many other countries, including Spain. This law was declared unconstitutional by the Supreme Court of Justice in 1997.

The age of consent is equal regardless of gender or sexual orientation at 16.

==== Vietnam ====
Both female and male same-sex sexual activities between consenting adults are legal and never have been criminalized in Vietnamese history.

=== Countries where same-sex sex is illegal ===
==== Afghanistan ====
Homosexuality is illegal in Afghanistan for both women and men, with the maximum penalty being death.

==== Algeria ====
Article 338 of Algerian law (English translation) reads:

"Anyone guilty of a homosexual act is punishable with imprisonment of between 2 months and two years, and with a fine of 500 to 2000 Algerian Dinars. If one of the participants is below 18 years old, the punishment for the older person can be raised to 3 years' imprisonment and a fine of 10,000 dinars"

Article 333 of the Algerian law (English translation) reads:

"When the outrage to public decency has consisted of an act against nature with an individual of the same sex, the penalty is imprisonment of between 6 months and 3 years, and a fine of between 1,000 and 10,000 Algerian Dinars."

— Article 333, ILGA May 2008 world laws report

==== Bangladesh ====
Formal laws against homosexuality were imposed by the British when Bangladesh was a part of British India; they were enacted in 1860 through the Indian Penal Code and went into effect in 1862. These laws were carried over into the Pakistan Penal Code following the partition of India in 1947, and continue to be part of Bangladesh's legal code since its independence from Pakistan in 1971.

==== Brunei ====
Same-sex sexual activity became illegal in Brunei in 1906 when the sultanate became a British Protectorate.

==== Burkina Faso ====
Prior to 2025, male and female types of same-sex sexual activity had always been legal in Burkina Faso, with an equal age of consent implemented in 1996. In July 2024, the military junta, led by Ibrahim Traoré, in power since the September 2022 Burkina Faso coup d'état, adopted an amended family code draft which would make consensual same-sex relations and the promotion of such a criminal offense.

Since 1 September 2025, the new criminal code has come into force banning any homosexual acts and promotion of homosexuality or "similar" behaviour (i.e. LGBTQ activities) with 2 to 5 years in prison and a fine as punishment. Foreign nationals who violate the law will be deported. The legislation was passed unanimously by the unelected 71-member transitional parliament. The legislation took effect immediately.

==== Burundi ====
Homosexuality is illegal in Burundi for women and men.

According to an unofficial English translation of Article 567 of the Burundi Penal Code, a person who has sexual relations with someone of the same sex may be punished with imprisonment for three months to two years and a fine of 50,000 to 100,000 francs.

==== Cameroon ====
Homosexuality is illegal in Cameroon.

==== Chad ====
Same-sex sexual activity is illegal in Chad since 2017. Previous to that there were no restrictions.

==== The Comoros ====
Both male and female same-sex sexual acts are illegal in Comoros. Article 300 of the new 2020 Penal Code establishes that "Any act of a sexual nature contrary to morality or unnatural shall be punished with a sentence of six months to two years and a fine of 100,000 to 300,000 francs."

Previously, the 1982 Penal Code established that such acts were punished with up to five years imprisonment and a fine of 50,000 to 1,000,000 francs.

==== Egypt ====
For men, “habitual” same-sex activity is illegal with punishment of up to 3 years imprisonment with fines.

==== Eritrea ====
Same-sex sexual activity is prohibited in Eritrea due to the penal code of 1957.

==== Eswatini ====
Male homosexuality is illegal in Eswatini, though this law is in practice unenforced. According to the 2021 Human Rights Practices Report from the US Department of State, "there has never been an arrest or prosecution for consensual same-sex conduct."

==== Ethiopia ====
The previous Penal Code of the country, enacted in 1957, encompassed a dedicated chapter addressing "sexual deviations." Contained within this chapter, Article 600 prescribed punitive measures for engaging in sexual acts or any other conduct deemed "indecent" with a person of the same sex. The prescribed penalties ranged from imprisonment for a period of 10 days to three years. The current Penal Code, enacted in 2004, continues to proscribe same-sex sexual activity as a criminal offense. As per the provisions outlined in Article 629, individuals found involved in such activities may face imprisonment, with a minimum sentence of one year, as explicitly delineated in Article 630. Additionally, under Article 630(1)(b), “making a profession” of such acts aggravates the penalty to up to 10 years.

In Ethiopian law, the wording of the penal code treats a homosexual act as an act of an aggressor against a victim. Consequently, the offense of the aggressor is considered aggravated, when it results in the suicide of the victim for reasons of "shame, distress or despair".

==== The Gambia ====
Homosexuality is illegal in the Gambia for both women and men.

==== Ghana ====
Male homosexuality has been illegal in Ghana since 1892 (when Ghana was known as the Gold Coast). Female homosexuality is de facto legal.

==== Grenada ====
Under the Grenada Criminal Code, Section 431, the offense of “unnatural crime” is committed by way of sexual intercourse per anum, i.e., anal penetration. Such an offense is punishable by imprisonment for ten years. As well, female homosexuality is illegal under public indecency laws.

==== Guinea ====
Female and male homosexuality is illegal in Guinea.

==== Guyana ====
In common with other former British colonies, Guyana had criminal codes imposed by its colonial rulers. Prohibitions against "buggery", "gross indecency", and "indecent behavior" were widely enacted across the British Empire in the nineteenth century. Although the terms are not explicitly defined in law, their English common law interpretation was well established by the time the Criminal Law (Offences) Act (1893) was introduced in Guyana. The country inherited the Act itself and the common law understanding of its provisions; these were retained following independence, long after the repeal of such offences in Britain.

The criminalization of same-sex activity under the Act is contained in the following provisions:'

Section 351 Any male person who, in public or private, commits, or is a party to the commission, or procures or attempts to procure the commission, by any male person, of any act of gross indecency with any other male person shall be guilty of a misdemeanour and liable to imprisonment for two years.

Section 352 (Note: Clauses (b) and (c) of §352 deal with sexual assaults, so are intentionally omitted from the quotation, as provisions of the Act not relevant to LGBT rights. Those provisions are: " ... or (b) assaults any person with intent to commit buggery; (c) or being a male, indecently assaults any other male person ...") Everyone who–
(a) attempts to commit buggery;
[...]
shall be guilty of felony and liable to imprisonment for ten years.

Section 353 Everyone who commits buggery ... shall be guilty of felony and liable to imprisonment for life.

Section 354 Everyone who–
(a) does any indecent act in any place to which the public have or are permitted to have access; or
(b) does any indecent act in any place, intending thereby to insult or offend any person, shall be guilty of a misdemeanour and liable to imprisonment for two years.

==== Indonesia ====
There is substantial evidence of a 2008 federal pornography law being used to arrest and prosecute LGBT people in Indonesia.

In 2022, the Indonesian government amended its penal code to prohibit sexual activity outside of marriage, a provision set to take in force on 2 January 2026. Unmarried partners who engage in sex can face up to one year in prison. Although the national penal code does not explicitly criminalize same-sex relationships, same-sex marriage is not legally recognized, effectively making all sexual activity between same-sex partners illegal.

As well, Aceh and South Sumatra are the two provinces of Indonesia which ban homosexuality, and there are some district and city level ordinances that make homosexuality illegal there (such as in Padang Panjang).

==== Iran ====
Homosexual sex is illegal in Iran and is punishable by execution, imprisonment, lashings, and fines.

==== Iraq ====
In 2024, there were plans to make homosexual relations in Iraq punishable by up to death, but the law was revised before being quietly passed later that year to lower the punishment to 15 years in jail with fines and deportation.

==== Jamaica ====
In Jamaica, homosexuality is illegal. Consensual sexual intercourse between same-sex partners is legally punishable by up to 10 years of imprisonment with hard labour.

==== Kenya ====
Expressions of homosexuality are illegal under Kenyan statutes and carry a maximum penalty of 14 years' imprisonment, or 21 years under certain aggravating circumstances. Sex acts between women are mentioned under the gender-neutral term "person" in Section 162 of the Penal Code and are enforced equally. On 28 November 2010, Prime Minister Raila Odinga called for women or men engaging in same-sex activity to be arrested.

==== Kiribati ====
Male homosexuality is illegal in Kiribati, although the law has long not been enforced; it carries a penalty of up to fourteen years in prison.

==== Kuwait ====
Consensual sexual activity between males is illegal under Kuwait's penal code. No laws specifically criminalise same-sex sexual activity between women. The relevant law states:

193 المادة رقم

اذا واقع رجل رجلا آخر بلغ الحادية والعشرين وكان ذلك برضائه ، عوقب كل منهما بالحبس مدة لا تجاوز سبع سنوات.

Translation:
Article No. 193

If a man has sexual intercourse with another man who has reached the age of twenty-one and this is with his consent, each of them shall be punished with imprisonment for a period not exceeding seven years.

The penal code also covers "public indecency":

المادة رقم 198

من اتى اشارة او فعلا فاضحا مخلا بالحياء في مكان عام او بحيث يراه او يسمعه من كان في مكان عام ، يعاقب بالحبس مدة لا تجاوز سنة واحدة وبغرامة لا تجاوز الف روبية او باحدى هاتين العقوبتين.

Translation:
Article No. 198

Whoever makes an indecent gesture or act in a public place or in such a way that it can be seen or heard by anyone in a public place, shall be punished with imprisonment for a period not exceeding one year and with a fine not exceeding one thousand rupees or with one of these two penalties.

==== Lebanon ====
Various courts have ruled that Article 534 of the Lebanese Penal Code, which prohibits having sexual relations that "contradict the laws of nature", should not be used to arrest LGBT people. Nonetheless, the law is still being used to harass and persecute LGBT people through occasional police arrests, in which detainees are sometimes subject to intrusive physical examinations.

==== Liberia ====
Same-sex sexual activity is criminalized in Liberia. Sections 14.74 and 14.79 of Liberia's penal code define consensual same-sex sexual activity as "voluntary sodomy," a first-degree misdemeanor punishable by up to one year in prison or a fine of up to L$1000, or both. The law applies to all individuals engaging in oral or anal sexual activity who "are not husband and wife or living together as man and wife though not legally married."

==== Libya ====
Homosexuality between women and between men is criminalized in Libya.

==== Malawi ====
The Malawi Penal Code provides:

Any female person who, whether in public or private, commits any act of gross indecency with another female person, or procures another female person to commit any act of gross indecency with her, or attempts to procure the commission of any such act by any female person with herself or with another female person, whether in public or private, shall be guilty of an offence and shall be liable to imprisonment for five years.

— Section 137A: Indecent practices between females

Any person who—

- (a) has carnal knowledge of any person against the order of nature; or ...
- (c) permits a male person to have carnal knowledge of him or her against the order of nature,

shall be guilty of a felony and shall be liable to imprisonment for fourteen years, with or without corporal punishment.

— Section 153. Unnatural offences

Any person who attempts to commit any of the offences specified in the last preceding section shall be guilty of a felony and shall be liable to imprisonment for seven years, with or without corporal punishment.

— Section 154: Attempt to commit unnatural offences

Any male person who, whether in public or private, commits any act of gross indecency with another male person, or procures another male person to commit any act of gross indecency with him, or attempts to procure the commission of any such act by any male person with himself or with another male person, whether in public or private, shall be guilty of a felony and shall be liable to imprisonment for five years, with or without corporal punishment [under Section 28 of the Penal Code].

— Section 156: Indecent practices between males

==== Malaysia ====
Section 377 of the Malaysian Penal Code prohibits carnal intercourse "against the order of nature", with Section 377A stating, "Any person who has sexual connection with another person by the introduction of the penis into the anus or mouth of the other person is said to commit carnal intercourse against the order of nature."

Section 377B of the code reads, "Whoever voluntarily commits carnal intercourse against the order of nature shall be punished with imprisonment for a term which may extend to twenty years, and shall also be liable to whipping."

==== The Maldives ====
Homosexuality is criminalized in the Maldives for women as well as men.

==== Mali ====
Homosexuality has been illegal in Mali since December 2024.

Although same-sex sexual conduct was not explicitly illegal in Mali prior to the law being passed, vague provisions in the penal code, such as Article 225, which penalizes “public indecency,” were frequently used to target LGBTQ individuals and those with nonconforming gender expressions.

==== Mauritania ====
Homosexuality is illegal for both women and men in Mauritania, with a maximum penalty of death, although that penalty is not given because it is under moratorium.

==== Morocco ====
Article 489 of the Penal Code of Morocco criminalizes "lewd or unnatural acts with an individual of the same sex". Same-sex sexual activity in Morocco is punished with anything from six months to three years' imprisonment and a fine of 120 to 1,000 dirhams.

==== Myanmar ====
Section 377 of the Myanmar Penal Code prohibits sodomy, whether heterosexual or homosexual. Alongside fines, the prescribed punishment is up to 10 years, although the law has not been strictly enforced.

==== Niger ====
All "lesbian, gay, bisexual, transgender, queer, intersex, asexual (LGBTQIA+)" acts or practices ("pratiques") are currently criminalized based on Article 25 of Niger's "Charte de la Refondation" ("Refoundation Charter"), adopted in March 2025 by the country's ruling military junta.

==== Nigeria ====
In Nigeria both lesbianism and male homosexuality are illegal, with a penalty of death in some parts of the country.

==== Oman ====
Homosexual sex is illegal for both women and men in Oman.

==== Pakistan ====
Section 377 of the Pakistan Penal Code states that "Whoever voluntarily has carnal intercourse against the order of nature with any man, woman or animal, shall be punished with imprisonment for life, or with imprisonment of either description for a term which shall not be less than two years nor more than ten years, and shall also be liable to fine."

The Offence of Zina in the Enforcement Of Hudood Ordinance criminalizes any form of penetration in a sexual act outside of marriage. Sharia law carries heavy penalties for homosexuality from imprisonment for 2–10 years or for life, or of 100 lashes or stoning to death if the person is married.

==== Palestine ====
On 18 September 1936, the criminal code of Mandatory Palestine, British Mandate Criminal Code, which drew from Ottoman law or English law, was enacted. Section 152(1)(b)(c) of the code states that any person who "commits an act of sodomy with any person against his will by the use of force or threats" or "commits an act of sodomy with a child under the age of sixteen years" is liable for imprisonment up to 14 years, while Section 152(2)(b) states that anyone who has "carnal knowledge" of anyone acting "against the law of nature" is liable for a prison term up to 10 years. Palestinian academic Sa'ed Atshan argued that this criminal code was an example of British export of homophobia to the Global South. The present applicability of this law is disputed. The Human Dignity Trust states that the criminal code is still "in operation" in Gaza albeit with scarce evidence of its enforcement, and Human Rights Watch states that the criminal code is still "in force" in Gaza. Amnesty International does not report same-sex sexual activity as being illegal in any Palestinian territory but emphasizes that Palestinian authorities do not stop, prevent or investigate homophobic and transphobic threats and attacks. The editor-in-chief of the Palestinian Yearbook of International Law, Anis. F. Kassim argued that the criminal code could be "interpreted as allowing homosexuality."

The decriminalization of homosexuality in Palestine is a patchwork. On the one hand, the British Mandate Criminal Code was in force in Jordan until 1951, with the Jordanian Penal Code having "no prohibition on sexual acts between persons of the same sex," which applied to the West Bank, while Israel stopped using the code in 1977. On the other, the Palestinian Authority has not legislated either for or against homosexuality. Legalistically, the confused legal legacy of foreign occupation – Ottoman, British, Jordanian, Egyptian and Israeli – continues to determine the erratic application or non-application of the criminal law to same-sex activity and gender variance in each of the territories. A correction issued by the Associated Press in August 2015 stated that homosexuality is not banned by law in the Gaza Strip or West Bank, but is "largely taboo," and added "there are no laws specifically banning homosexual acts."

In 2018, Human Rights Watch noted that laws in the West Bank and the Gaza Strip include a combination of unified laws passed by the Palestinian Legislative Council and ratified by the President of Palestine, and stated that laws from the former British Mandate, Egypt, and Jordan still apply when unified laws have not been issued. However, HRW added that Hamas has issued separate decrees and has not applied presidential decrees by the President of Palestine. Also, the organization reported that articles 258 and 263 of the draft penal code, in 2003, for Palestine, contained "provisions that criminalize adult consensual same sex conduct". However, it is not known whether this code, which prohibited sexual intercourse with women who are over 18 in an "illicit manner" with imprisonment, a prison term of up to five years if they are related to the said woman or up to ten years for those who engage in rape, and up to five years in prison for a male who "commits the act of sodomy with another male", was implemented.

==== Papua New Guinea ====
Male same-sex sexual activity is prohibited by Section 210 of the Papua New Guinea Penal Code. Anal sex and oral sex between persons of the opposite sex is also illegal. Those caught engaging in anal sex or oral sex (whether heterosexual or homosexual) can be punished with up to fourteen years' imprisonment. Other same-sex sexual acts can be punished with up to three years' imprisonment.

==== Qatar ====
Homosexuality was made illegal in British-controlled Qatar via the Indian Penal Code through the Order in Council 1938. This was replaced by Article 171 in 1956, and then after independence, Article 171 was replaced by Article 201 of Qatar's 1971 Penal Code. Since 2004, Article 296 of the current Penal Code (Law 11/2004) stipulates imprisonment between one and three years for sodomy. This is less severe than the 1971 law that stipulated up to five years' imprisonment for men and women found to be homosexual (punishment of sexual acts instead of punishment for sexual orientation). The local death penalty for same-gender sex is applicable only to Muslims because extramarital sex regardless of the gender of the participants is punishable by death and because same-gender couples cannot get married. However, there is no evidence that the death penalty has been applied for consensual same-sex relations taking place between adults outside the spaces policed by authorities.

==== Samoa ====
Male homosexuality is illegal in Samoa, but the law has not been enforced recently.

==== Saint Vincent and the Grenadines ====
Homosexuality is illegal in Saint Vincent and the Grenadines. Section 148 of the Criminal Code states that:

"Any person, who in public or private, commits an act of gross indecency with another person of the same sex, or procures or attempts to procure another person of the same sex to commit an act of gross indecency with him or her, is guilty of an offence and liable to imprisonment for five years."

— Section 148 of the Criminal Code

Section 146 of the 1990 Criminal Code states that:

"Any person who commits buggery with any other person; commits buggery with an animal; or permits any person to commit buggery with him or her; is guilty of an offence and liable to imprisonment for ten years".

— Section 146 of the 1990 Criminal Code

Being gender-neutral, the "buggery" law applies universally to both heterosexual and homosexual conduct. However, reports state that these laws are unenforced.

==== Saudi Arabia ====
In Saudi Arabia both male and female homosexuality are illegal, with the maximum penalty being death.

==== Senegal ====
In Senegal both male and female homosexuality are illegal, with the maximum penalty being ten years imprisonment and a fine.

==== Sierra Leone ====
Male homosexuality is illegal in Sierra Leone.

==== Solomon Islands ====
Same-sex sexual activity has been illegal in the Solomon Islands since its criminalization in the 1880s.

==== Somalia ====
Homosexuality is illegal in all of Somalia for women and men. It is punishable by death in some parts of Somalia.

==== South Korea ====
Same-sex sex is legal in South Korea outside of the military.

However, same-sex sexual acts are illegal in the military since 1962, punishable by up to two years imprisonment.

==== South Sudan ====
Male homosexuality is illegal in South Sudan.

==== Sri Lanka ====
Homosexuality is illegal for both women and men; however, the Supreme Court has ruled that consenting adults should not be imprisoned for it.

==== Sudan ====
Homosexuality in Sudan is illegal for both men and women.

As well, sodomy, defined as anal sex whether the couple is same-sex or opposite-sex, is illegal in Sudan. The Offence is defined in Article 148 of the Criminal Act of 1991. The original wording (translated) of the sodomy law, as amended in 2009, follows:

(1)There shall be deemed to commit sodomy, every man who penetrates his glans, or the equivalent thereof, in the anus of a woman, or another man's, or permits another man to penetrate his glans, or its equivalent in his anus.
(2) (a) whoever commits the offence of sodomy, shall be punished, with shipping a hundred lashes, and he may also be punished, with imprisonment, for a term not exceeding five years;
(b) where the offender is convicted for the second time, he shall be punished, with whipping a hundred lashes, and with imprisonment, for a term, not exceeding five years;
(c) where the offender is convicted for the third time he shall be punished, with death, or with life imprisonment.

— Article 148: Offence of sodomy, 1991 Criminal Act as Amended in 2009

On 9 July 2020, Sudan abolished the death penalty as a punishment for anal sex. The Transitional Sovereignty Council also eliminated the imposition of 100 lashes and added two years to the sentence for a second offence. The penalty for a third offence was changed from death or life imprisonment to life imprisonment. A first offence is now punished with up to five years and a second offence with up to seven years.

==== Syria ====
Article 520 of the penal code of 1949 prohibits "carnal relations” that are “against the order of nature," punishable with a prison sentence of up to three years.

==== Tanzania ====
Female and male homosexuality are both illegal in Tanzania.

==== Togo ====
Homosexuality is illegal for both men and women in Togo.

==== Tonga ====
Male same-sex sexual activity, as well as heterosexual sodomy, is illegal in Tonga under the Criminal Offences Act (Tongan: Lao ki he Ngaahi Hia) with a maximum penalty of 10 years imprisonment. The offenders may also be whipped as a punishment if convicted.

==== Tunisia ====
Article 230 of the Penal Code of 1913 (largely modified in 1964) decrees imprisonment of up to three years for private acts of sodomy between consenting adults. (The official text of Article 230 in French is "La sodomie, si elle ne rentre dans aucun des cas prévus aux articles précédents, est punie de l'emprisonnement pendant trois ans."). Gay people are also often accused of violating Article 226 of the national Penal Code which outlaws "outrages against public decency".

==== Turkmenistan ====
Male homosexuality is illegal in Turkmenistan.

==== Tuvalu ====
The Penal Code prohibits male homosexual and heterosexual anal intercourse. However, according to the United States Department of State, as of 2013 there were no reports of prosecution of consenting adults under these provisions.

==== Uganda ====
The Anti-Homosexuality Act, 2023 prescribes up to twenty years in prison for "promotion of homosexuality", life imprisonment for "homosexual acts", and the death penalty for "aggravated homosexuality". The latter offence includes "serial offenders", same-sex rape, sex in a position of authority or procured by intimidation, sex with persons older than seventy-five, sex with the disabled and mentally ill, and homosexual acts committed by a person with a previous conviction of homosexuality. Further, under its provisions, the promotion (including normalisation) of homosexuality is punishable by imprisonment for up to 20 years and fines. This Act came into force in 2023, (Note: A draft version of the Act, the Anti-Homosexuality Bill (Bill no. 3 of 2023), generated international news coverage upon its first successful passage through the parliament. Had it been enacted unamended, it would have criminalised merely identifying as gay, lesbian or bisexual, transgender or non-binary, stipulating that "hold[ing] out as a lesbian, gay, transgender, a queer or any other sexual or gender identity that is contrary to the binary categories of male and female" was committing "an offence of homosexuality" and thus liable to the penalty of ten years in prison. This provision, 2(1)(d), was excluded from the Act that was finally passed and signed into law. Coverage on this earlier bill included: "Uganda passes a law making it a crime to identify as LGBTQ". Reuters. 22 March 2023.; "'Deeply troubling': UN rights chief on Uganda anti-gay bill" The Independent; "Uganda Anti-Homosexuality bill: Life in prison for saying you're gay". BBC News; "Cheers and applause as Uganda passes new bill banning identifying as LGBT" BBC News; "Ugandan MPs pass bill imposing death penalty for homosexuality" The Guardian; "Uganda's new anti-homosexuality law bans identification as LGBTQ" Aljazeera; "Uganda passes harsh new bill targeting LGBT+ community" ITV News; "UN rights chief calls Uganda anti-gay bill 'deeply troubling'" PBS News) making Uganda the only Christian-majority country to punish some types of consensual same-sex acts with the death penalty. A similar law had been passed in 2013, but was later struck down in 2014 as unconstitutional by the Constitutional Court of Uganda on legal technicalities.

==== United Arab Emirates ====
Same-sex sexual activity is illegal in the United Arab Emirates; however, prosecution is brought only on complaint of a husband or (male) legal guardian. There is no maximum punishment for this in the United Arab Emirates, with the sentence at courts' discretion (10 years imprisonment in Dubai, 14 years imprisonment in Abu Dhabi), and the minimum punishment is 6 months' imprisonment.

==== Uzbekistan ====
Laws criminalizing consensual same-sex sexual activity between men were enacted in the Uzbek SSR in 1926. Consensual same-sex sexual activity between men is criminalized in present-day Uzbekistan by Article 120 of Uzbek's criminal code (1994):

Besoqolbozlik, that is, voluntary sexual intercourse of two male individuals – shall be punished with imprisonment up to three years.

— § 120, Uzbek Penal Code 1994 (revised 2001)

==== Yemen ====
Article 264 of the national penal code prohibits private consensual homosexual acts between adult men. The stipulated punishment in the law for unmarried men is 100 lashes and up to a year in prison. The law stipulates that married men convicted of homosexuality are to be put to death.

Article 268 of the national penal code prohibits private consensual homosexual acts between adult women. The law stipulates that premeditated acts of lesbianism are punished with up to three years in prison.

==== Zambia ====
Same-sex sexual activity is proscribed by Zambia's penal code. The law criminalizes consensual same-sex sexual conduct, with penalties upon conviction for engaging in "acts against the order of nature" of fifteen years' to life imprisonment. Conviction under the lesser charge of "gross indecency" carries a penalty of up to fourteen years' imprisonment.

==== Zimbabwe ====
Male homosexual sex has been illegal in Zimbabwe since 1891 (as Rhodesia), and female homosexual sex has been illegal there since 2006.

== See also ==
- Ayoni
- Homophobia
- LGBT rights by country
- Sexual consent in law
- Societal attitudes towards homosexuality
- Timeline of LGBT history in Britain
- Utrecht sodomy trials

== Sources ==
- David Bianco, First Sodomy Laws in the American Colonies
- International Lesbian and Gay Association, "World Legal Wrap-Up" (Nov. 2006)
- Daniel Ottosson, International Lesbian and Gay Association, "With the Government in Our Bedrooms: A Survey on the Laws Over the World Prohibiting Consenting Adult Sexual Same-Sex Acts" (Nov. 2006)
