= Landers Peak =

Landers Peak or Lander's Peak may refer to:

- Lander Peak, in the Rocky Mountains of North America
- The Rocky Mountains, Lander's Peak, 1863 painting by Albert Bierstadt
- Landers Peaks, a group of peaks in Antarctica

== See also ==
- Landers (disambiguation)
- Lander (disambiguation)
