= Landers =

Landers may refer to:

== Places ==
- Landers, California, United States
- Landers Peaks, group of peaks in the northern portion of Alexander Island, Antarctica
- Landers Shoot, Queensland, Australia

== Other uses ==
- Lander's Horseshoe Bat (Rhinolophus landeri), a species of bat in the family Rhinolophidae
- Ask Ann Landers, a popular advice column in the Chicago Sun-Times
- 1992 Landers earthquake, an earthquake centered in California
- Lander's Center, a multipurpose arena in Southaven, Mississippi
- Landers, Frary & Clark, a housewares company based in New Britain, Connecticut
- Landers Superstore, a retail warehouse club in the Philippines
- Landers Theatre, a civic theater in Springfield, Missouri
- Little Landers, a term that refers to early settlers in parts of California
- SSG Landers, a South Korean baseball team
- Landers (surname), a list of people surnamed Landers (including fictional people)

== See also ==
- Lander (disambiguation)
- Länder
- Flatlander (disambiguation)
- Outlander (disambiguation)
