= German reunification =

1989–1991 unification process of Germany

- Part of the revolutions of 1989 and the end of the Cold War
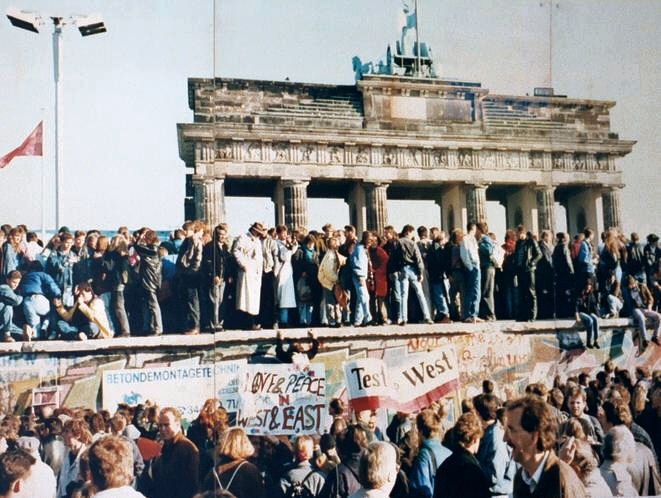
- Germans stand on top of the Berlin Wall in front of the Brandenburg Gate in the days before the wall was torn down
- Native name: Deutsche Wiedervereinigung; Die Wende
- Date: 9 November 1989 – 3 October 1990 (Final agreement effective from 15 March 1991)
- Location: East Germany; West Germany; ↓; Germany
- Cause: Revolutions of 1989: Peaceful Revolution; Fall of the Berlin Wall
- Outcome: Reunification of Germany under the Federal Republic: Berlin Wall opened on 9 November 1989; Free elections in East Germany return a pro-unification government (18 March 1990); East and West Germany establish a monetary union from a treaty signed 18 May 1990, effective 1 July 1990; East Germany dissolves itself effective 3 October 1990; East German Länder of Brandenburg, Mecklenburg-Western Pomerania, Saxony, Saxony-Anhalt, and Thuringia reestablished to become states of the reunified Germany; East German Länder join West Germany on 3 October 1990 under the Unification Treaty signed 31 August 1990; East German territories reunify within the European Economic Community and NATO; Two Plus Four Agreement signed 12 September 1990 restores full sovereignty to Germany, effective 15 March 1991; East Berlin merges with West Berlin to form a reunited Berlin as the capital of Germany; Reunited Germany legally recognises the Germany–Poland border in the German–Polish Border Treaty of 1990; Withdrawal of Soviet, then Russian troops completed 31 August 1994; Relocation of the federal government to Berlin completed 2000; The country becomes one of the great powers again

West Germany and East Germany (1949 (Note: The Saarland was de facto separated from occupied Germany to become a protectorate in 1947; it became part of West Germany in 1957.)–1990)

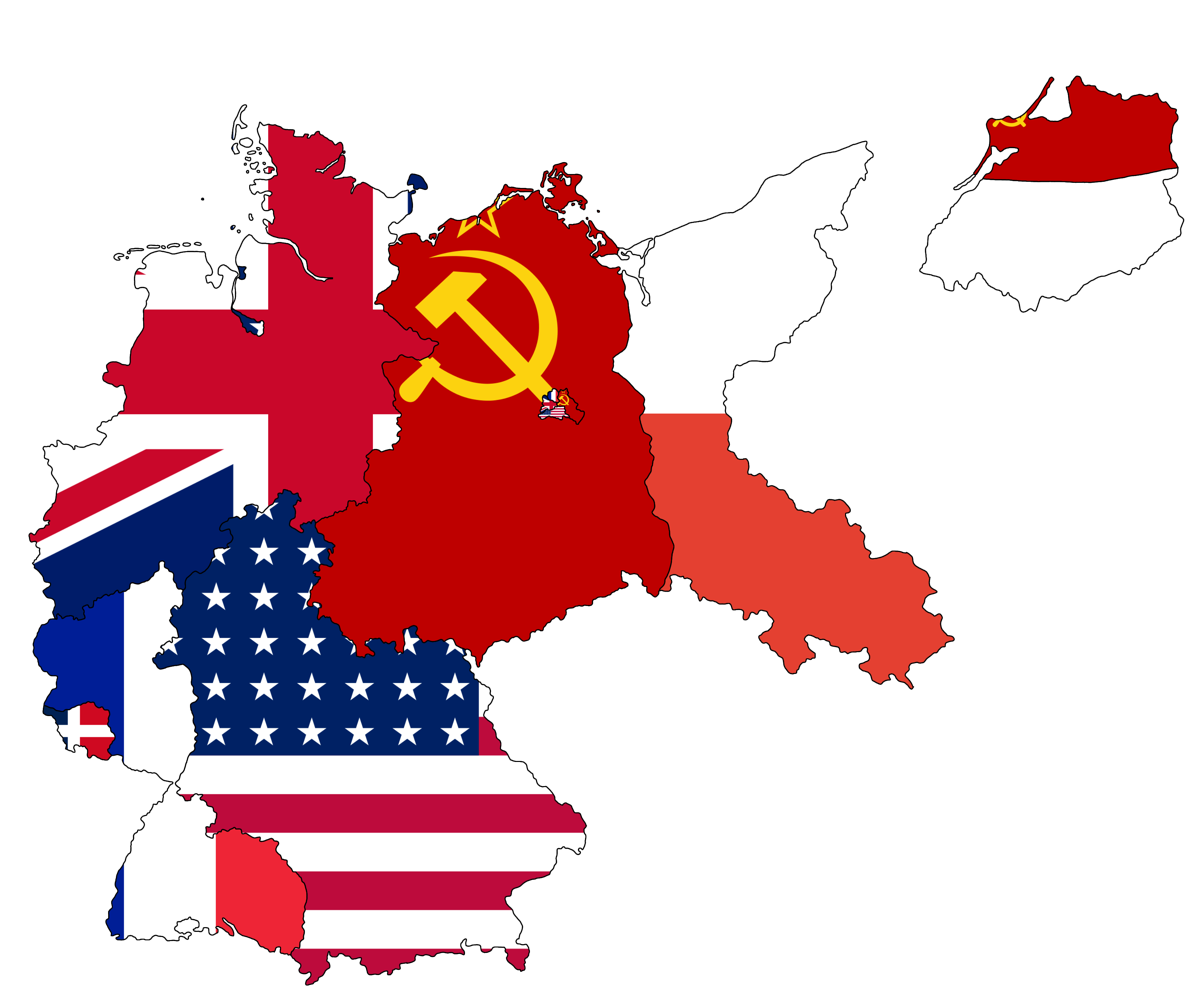
Allied-occupied Germany and Saar Protectorate

Both become a Sovereign State during the Cold War in 1945 to 1991

Germany (1990–present)

German reunification (German: Deutsche Wiedervereinigung), also known as the expansion of the Federal Republic of Germany (BRD), was the process of re-establishing Germany as a single sovereign state, which began on 9 November 1989 and culminated on 3 October 1990 with the dissolution of the German Democratic Republic and the integration of its re-established constituent federated states into the Federal Republic of Germany to form present-day Germany. This date was chosen as the customary German Unity Day, and has thereafter been celebrated each year as a national holiday. On the same date, East and West Berlin were also reunified into a single city, which eventually became the capital of Germany.

The East German government, controlled by the Socialist Unity Party of Germany (SED), started to falter on 2 May 1989, when the removal of Hungary's border fence with Austria opened a hole in the Iron Curtain. The border was still closely guarded, but the Pan-European Picnic and the indecisive reaction of the rulers of the Eastern Bloc started off an irreversible movement. It allowed an exodus of thousands of East Germans fleeing to West Germany via Hungary. The Peaceful Revolution, part of the international revolutions of 1989 including a series of protests by East German citizens, led to the fall of the Berlin Wall on 9 November 1989 and the GDR's first free elections on 18 March 1990, and then to negotiations between the two countries that culminated in a Unification Treaty. Other negotiations between the two Germanies and the four occupying powers in Germany produced the Treaty on the Final Settlement with Respect to Germany, which granted on 15 March 1991 full sovereignty to a reunified German state, whose two parts had previously been bound by a number of limitations stemming from their post-World War II status as occupation zones, though it was not until 31 August 1994 that the last Russian occupation troops left Germany.

After the end of World War II in Europe, the old German Reich, consequent on the unconditional surrender of all German armed forces and the total absence of any German central government authority, had effectively ceased to exist, and Germany was occupied and divided by the four Allied countries. There was no peace treaty. Two countries emerged. The American-occupied, British-occupied, and French-occupied zones combined to form the FRG, i.e., West Germany, on 23 May 1949. The Soviet-occupied zone formed the GDR, i.e., East Germany, in October 1949. The West German state joined NATO in 1955. In 1990, a range of opinions continued to be maintained over whether a reunited Germany could be said to represent "Germany as a whole" (Note: The sentence "Germany as a whole" was recorded in the Potsdam Agreement to mention Germany.) for this purpose. In the context of the revolutions of 1989; on 12 September 1990, under the Two Plus Four Treaty with the four Allies, both East and West Germany committed to the principle that their joint pre-1990 boundary constituted the entire territory that could be claimed by a government of Germany.

The reunited state is not a successor state, but an enlarged continuation of the 1949–1990 West German state. The enlarged Federal Republic of Germany retained the West German seats in the governing bodies of the European Economic Community (EEC) (later the European Union) and in international organizations including the North Atlantic Treaty Organization (NATO) and the United Nations (UN), while relinquishing membership in the Warsaw Pact (WP) and other international organizations to which only East Germany belonged.

== Naming ==
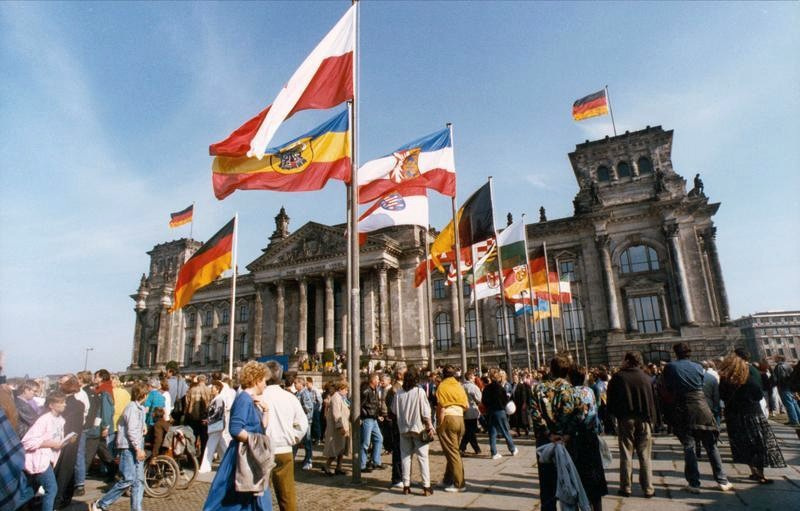
1990 German Unity Day, with flags of all German states at the Reichstag building in Berlin, Germany

The term "German reunification" was given to the process of the German Democratic Republic joining the Federal Republic of Germany with full German sovereignty from the four Allied-occupied countries to distinguish it from the process of unification of most of the German states into the German Empire (German Reich) led by the Kingdom of Prussia that took place from 18 August 1866 to 18 January 1871, 3 October 1990 was the day when Germany again became a single nation-state. However, for political and diplomatic reasons, West German politicians carefully avoided the term "reunification" during the runup to what Germans frequently refer to as Die Wende (roughly: "the turning point"). The 1990 treaty defines the official term as Deutsche Einheit ("German unity"); this is commonly used in Germany.

After 1990, the term die Wende became more common. The term generally refers to the events (mostly in Eastern Europe) that led up to the actual reunification, and loosely translates to "the turning point". Anti-communist activists from Eastern Germany rejected the term Wende as it had been introduced by the SED Secretary General Egon Krenz.

Some people have stated that the reunification can be classified as an annexation of the GDR by the FRG. Scholar Ned Richardson-Little from the University of Erfurt noted that the terminology of an annexation can be interpreted from backgrounds across the political spectrum. In 2015, a Russian proposal was made that classified it as an annexation. Mikhail Gorbachev named the proposal 'nonsense'. In 2010, Matthias Platzeck referred to the reunification as an 'anschluss'.

== Precursors to reunification ==
One map about Germany which shows the four Allied occupation zones (de facto not including Saarland) in Germany (1947–1949)

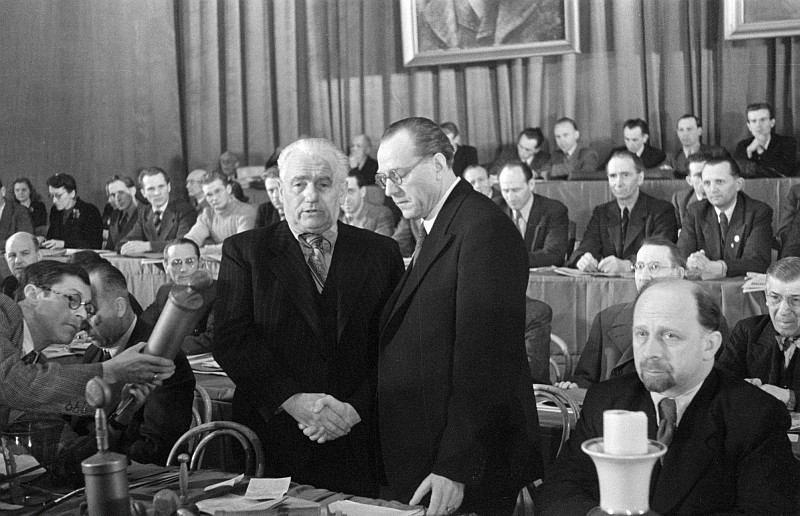
An East German political event on 21 April 1946: Otto Grotewohl (right) and Wilhelm Pieck (left) seal the merger of two parties, SPD and KPD, to form the SED, a communist party that would dominate the future East German state, with a symbolic handshake. Walter Ulbricht is seated in the foreground to the right of Grotewohl. Avraham Pisarek

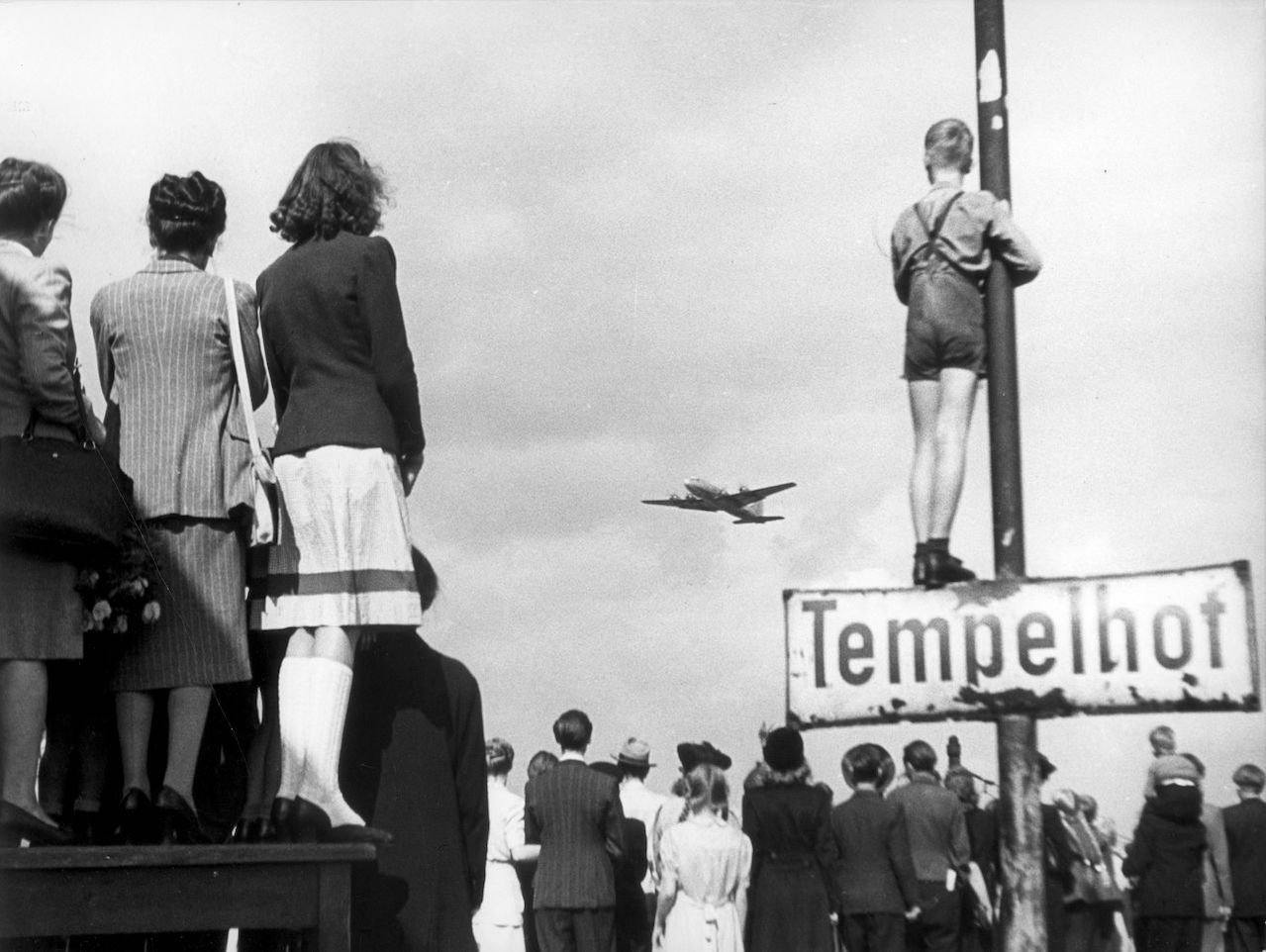
Berlin Blockade (1948–1949)

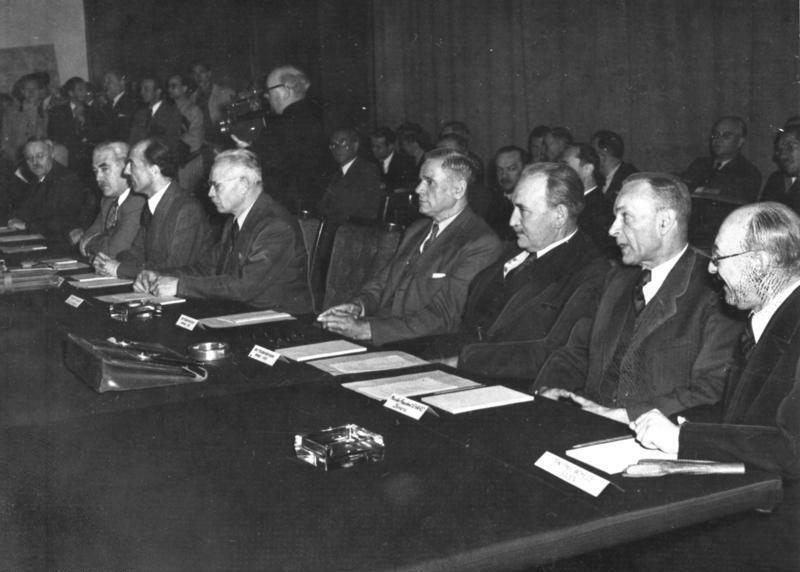
West German prime ministers and mayors received the British, American, and French occupiers' Frankfurt Documents which contained recommendations for the establishment new state and formed a working basis for the Basic Law for the Federal Republic of Germany; 1 July 1948

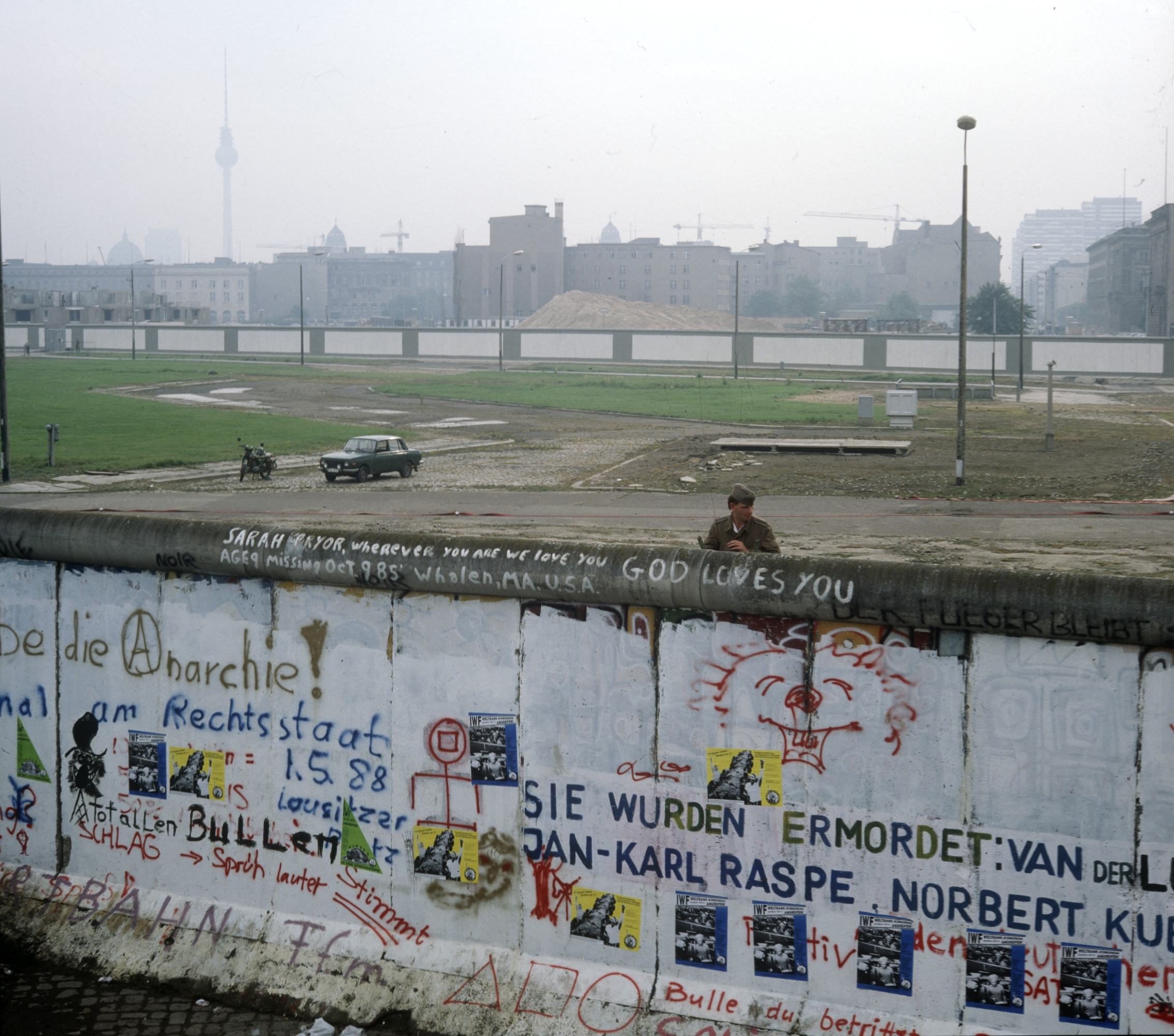
Berlin Wall (1961–1989)

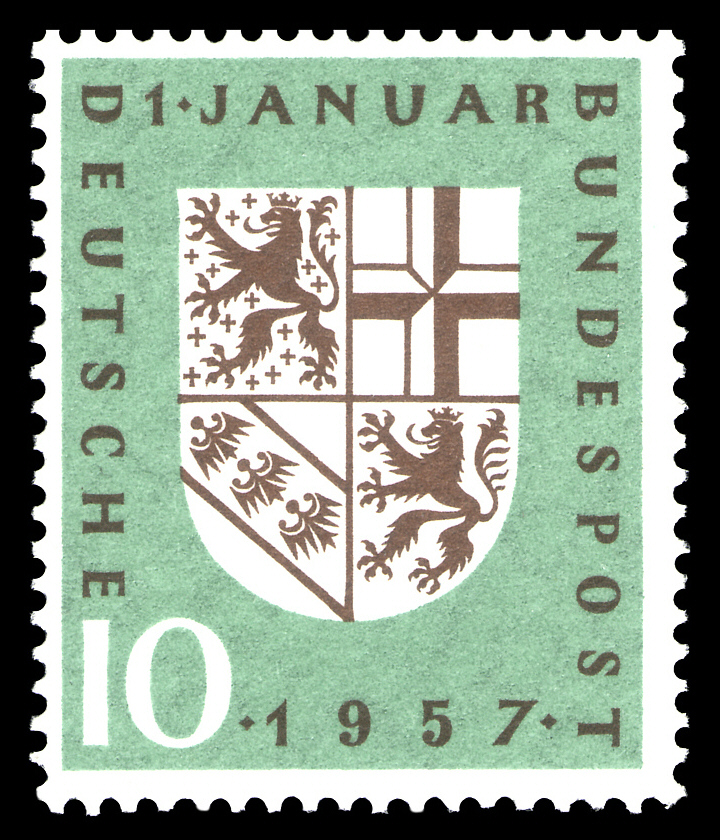
Stamp of the Deutsche Bundespost (1957) for the political incorporation of the Saarland into the Federal Republic of Germany on 1 January 1957 with the new state coat of arms of the Saarland

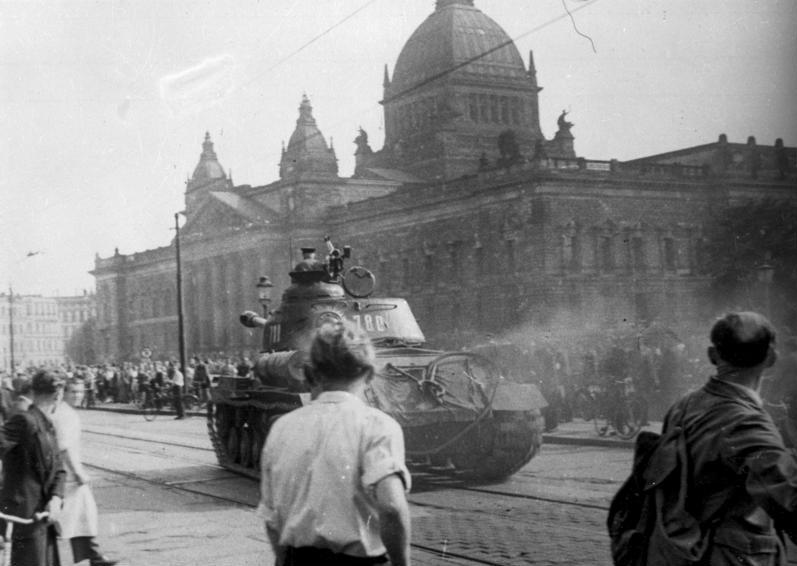
Soviet IS-2 tank in Leipzig in the East German uprising of 1953 on 17 June

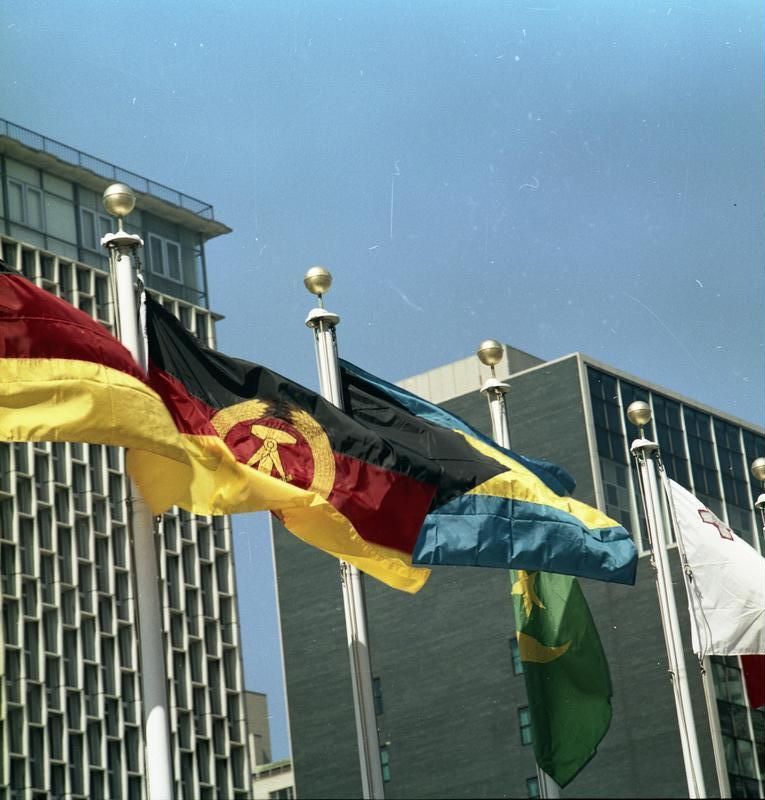
Flags of the two Germanies in front of the United Nations headquarters, September 1973

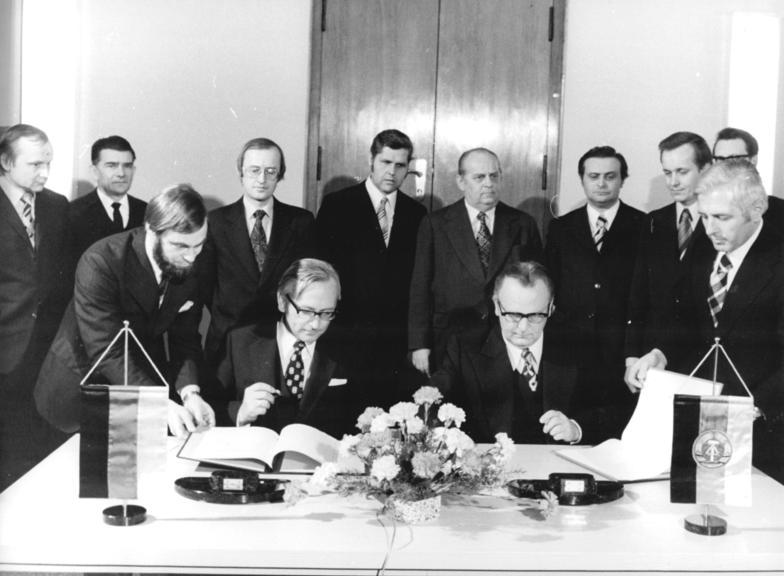
On 19 December 1975, the permanent representative Günter Gaus signed an agreement on transit fees with the head of department in the East German Ministry of Finance, Hans Nimmerich, in the House of Ministries

After the suicide of Adolf Hitler on 30 April 1945, Karl Dönitz assumed the title of Reichspräsident in accordance with Hitler's last political testament. As such, he authorised the signing of the unconditional surrender of all German armed forces, which took effect on 8 May 1945. He tried to establish a government under Ludwig Graf Schwerin von Krosigk in Flensburg. This government, however, was not recognised by the Allies; and Dönitz and all its other members were arrested on 23 May by British forces. On 5 June 1945, in Berlin, the supreme commanders of the four occupying powers signed a common Berlin Declaration, which formally confirmed the defeat of Nazi Germany in World War II, as well as the complete legal extinction of the German Reich with the death of Adolf Hitler on 30 April 1945 Germany was occupied by four countries representing the victorious Allies signing the agreement (US, UK, France, and the USSR). The declaration also formed the Allied Control Council (ACC) of these four countries ruling Germany, and confirmed the German borders which had been in force before the annexation of Austria. With the Potsdam Agreement at the Potsdam Conference between the three main Allies defeating the European Axis (US, UK, and the USSR) on 2 August 1945, Germany was divided by the Allies into occupation zones, each under the military government of one of these four countries. The agreement also modified Germany's border, with the country de facto losing its former territories east of the Oder–Neisse line to Poland and the Soviet Union (most for Poland because the eastern territories of former Poland were annexed by the USSR). Germany's border decision came under pressure from Stalin, the dictator of the Soviet Union. During and after the war, many ethnic Germans who had lived in the historically German lands in Central and Eastern Europe, including territories east of the Oder–Neisse line, fled and were expelled to post-war German and Austrian territory. Saarland, an area in the French occupation zone, was separated from Germany when its own constitution took effect, to become a French protectorate on 17 December 1947.

=== Developments from 1948 ===
Among the Allies, geo-political tension between the Soviet Union and Western Allies in occupied Germany as part of their tension in the world led the Soviets to de facto withdraw from the ACC on 20 March 1948 (four occupying countries restored the act of the ACC in 1971) and blockade West Berlin (after the introduction of a new currency in West Germany on 20 June of the same year) from 20 June 1948 to 12 May 1949, but the USSR could not force the three Western Allies to withdraw from West Berlin as they wanted; consequently, the foundation of a new German state became impossible. The Federal Republic of Germany, or "West Germany", a liberal democracy, was established in the US, UK, and French zones on 23 May 1949. West Germany was de jure established in the Trizone occupied by three Western Allies and established on 1 August 1948. Its forerunner was the Bizone formed by the US and UK zones on 1 January 1947 before the inclusion of the French zone. The Trizone did not include West Berlin, which was also occupied by three Western Allies, although the city was de facto part of the West German state; the German Democratic Republic or "East Germany", a communist state with a planned and public economy which declared itself as the new state and the successor of the German Reich, a legal-former German state (in contrast to the Federal Republic of Germany, which considered itself a state partially identical with the German Reich and not merely its successor, with the "partial identity" limited to apply only within its current de facto territory), was established in the Soviet zone on 7 October 1949. It de jure did not include East Berlin, occupied by the Soviets, although the city was de facto its capital: the severe ideological conflict between German politicians and sociologists in their self-governing east–west society was preceded by the influence of higher foreign occupiers; however this only really rose to become official with the birth of the two countries of Germany in the context of the period of international tension during the Cold War. The capital of West Germany was Bonn; however it was only considered provisional due to the West German aspiration to establish Berlin as its capital, although at the time Berlin was divided, with the eastern part de facto managed by East Germany. East Germany originally also wanted to gain West Berlin and make the unified Berlin its capital.

=== 1952 onwards ===
The Western Allies and West Germany rejected the Soviet Union's idea of neutral reunification in 1952, resulting in the two German governments continuing to exist side-by-side. Most of the border between two Germanies, and later the border in Berlin, were physically fortified and tightly controlled by East Germany from 1952 and 1961, respectively. The flags of the two German countries were originally the same, but in 1959 East Germany changed its flag. The West German government initially did not recognize the new and de facto German–Polish border, nor East Germany, but later eventually recognized the border in 1972 (with the 1970 Treaty of Warsaw) and East Germany in 1973 (with the 1972 Basic Treaty) when applying a common policy to reconcile with the communist countries in the East. The East German government also had encouraged two-state status after initially denying the existence of the West German state, influenced by the Soviet policy of "peaceful coexistence". The mutual recognition of the two Germanies paved the way for both countries to be widely recognized internationally. (Note: In addition, prior to 1965 the IOC only recognized the Olympic committee for Germany, so the separate Olympic committees of Saarland, the Federal Republic of Germany, and the German Democratic Republic were not recognized by the IOC, and Germany was represented by a single team in the Winter and Summer Olympics until 1968.) The two Germanies joined the United Nations as two separate country members in 1973 and East Germany abandoned its goal of reunification with their compatriots in the West in a constitutional amendment the following year.

The principle is written in our Constitution – that no one has the right to give up a policy whose goal is the eventual reunification of Germany. But in a realistic view of the world, this is a goal that could take generations beyond my own to achieve.

— CDU Leader Helmut Kohl for The New York Times, 1976

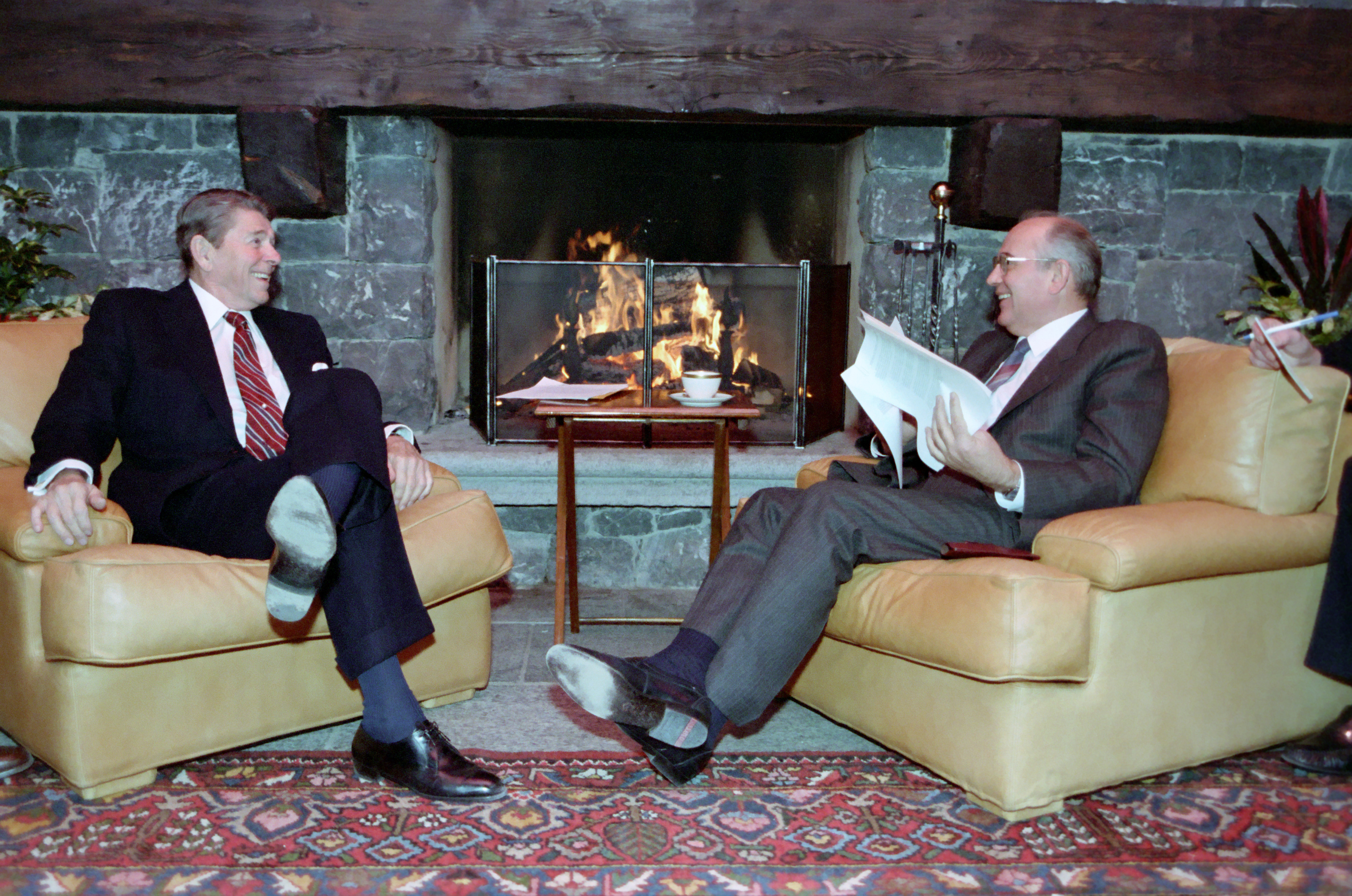
Ronald Reagan (United States) and Mikhail Gorbachev (Soviet Union) at the first summit in Geneva, Switzerland on 19 November 1985

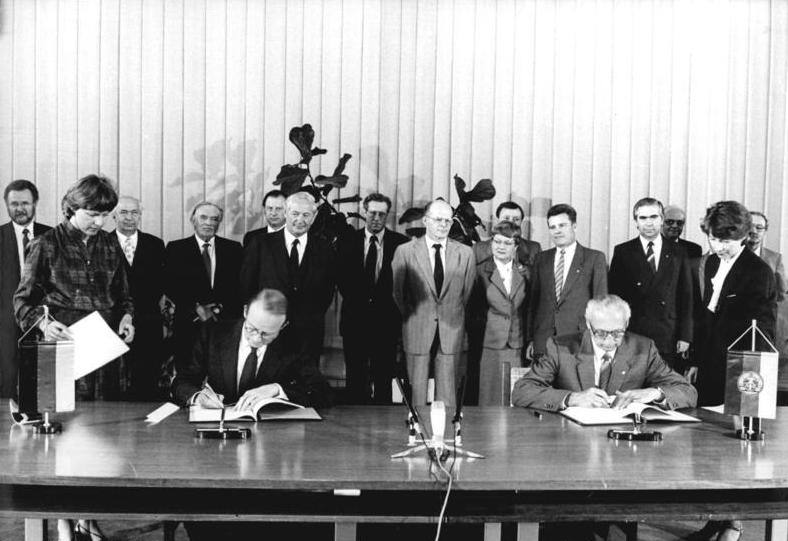
Signing the German-German Cultural Agreement between the two countries, East Germany and West Germany on 6 May 1986

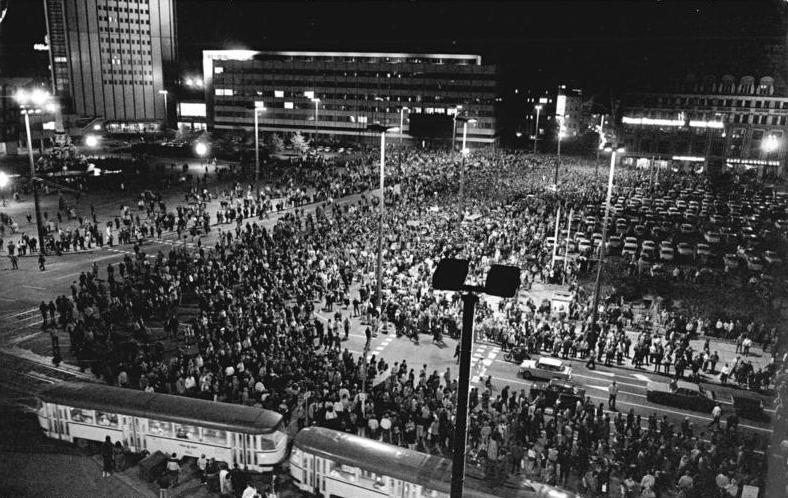
East German Monday demonstration against the government in Leipzig, 16 October 1989

Mikhail Gorbachev had led the country as General Secretary of the Communist Party of the Soviet Union since 1985. During this time, the Soviet Union experienced a period of economic and political stagnation, and correspondingly decreased intervention in Eastern Bloc politics. In 1987, the United States President Ronald Reagan gave a famous speech at the Brandenburg Gate, challenging Soviet General Secretary Mikhail Gorbachev to "tear down this wall" which prevented freedom of movement in Berlin. The wall had stood as an icon for the political and economic division between East and West, a division that Churchill had referred to as the "Iron Curtain". Gorbachev announced in 1988 that the Soviet Union would abandon the Brezhnev Doctrine and allow the Eastern European countries to freely determine their own internal affairs. In early 1989, under a new era of Soviet policies of glasnost (openness) and perestroika (economic restructuring), and taken further by Gorbachev, the Solidarity movement took hold in Poland. Further inspired by other images of brave defiance, a wave of revolutions swept throughout the Eastern Bloc that year. In May 1989, Hungary removed their border fence. However, the dismantling of the old Hungarian border facilities did not open the borders nor were the previous strict controls removed, and the isolation by the Iron Curtain was still intact over its entire length. The opening of a border gate between Austria and Hungary at the Pan-European Picnic on 19 August 1989 then set in motion a peaceful chain reaction, at the end of which there was no longer a GDR and the Eastern Bloc had disintegrated. Extensive advertising for the planned picnic was made by posters and flyers among the GDR holidaymakers in Hungary. The Austrian branch of the Paneuropean Union, which was then headed by Karl von Habsburg, distributed thousands of brochures inviting them to a picnic near the border at Sopron. It was the largest escape movement from East Germany since the Berlin Wall had been built in 1961. After the picnic, which was based on an idea of Karl's father Otto von Habsburg to test the reaction of the USSR and Mikhail Gorbachev to an opening of the border, tens of thousands of media-informed East Germans set off for Hungary. The media reaction of Erich Honecker in the Daily Mirror of 19 August 1989 showed the public in East and West that the Eastern European communist rulers had suffered a loss of power in their own sphere, and that they were no longer in control of events: "Habsburg distributed leaflets far into Poland, in which the East German holidaymakers were invited to a picnic. When they came to the picnic, they were given gifts, food and Deutsche Marks, and then they were persuaded to come to the West." In particular, Habsburg and the Hungarian Minister of State Imre Pozsgay considered whether Moscow would command the Soviet troops stationed in Hungary to intervene. But, with the mass exodus at the Pan-European Picnic, the subsequent hesitant behavior of the Socialist Unity Party of East Germany and the nonintervention of the Soviet Union broke the dams. Thus, the bracket of the Eastern Bloc was broken.

Hungary was no longer ready to keep its borders completely closed or to oblige its border troops to use force of arms. By the end of September 1989, more than 30,000 East German citizens had escaped to the West before the GDR denied travel to Hungary, leaving Czechoslovakia as the only neighboring state to which East Germans could escape.

Even then, many people within and outside Germany still believed that real reunification between the two countries would not happen in the foreseeable future. The turning point in Germany, called Die Wende, was marked by the "Peaceful Revolution" leading to the fall of the Berlin Wall on the night of 9 November 1989, with East and West Germany subsequently entering into negotiations toward eliminating the division that had been imposed upon Germans more than four decades earlier.

== Process of reunification ==
=== Cooperation ===
Flag of East Germany with cut-out emblem, prominently visible during protests against the Communist Regime

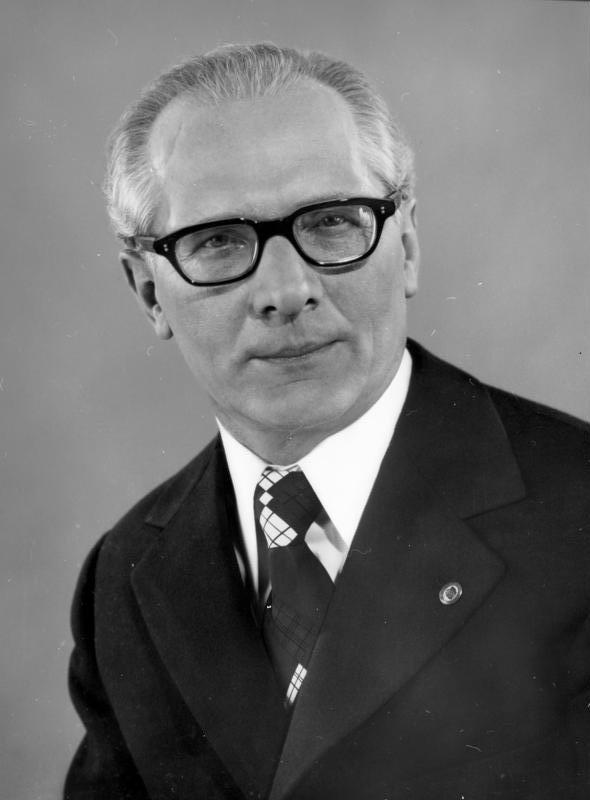
The end of East Germany became clear after the resignation of Erich Honecker

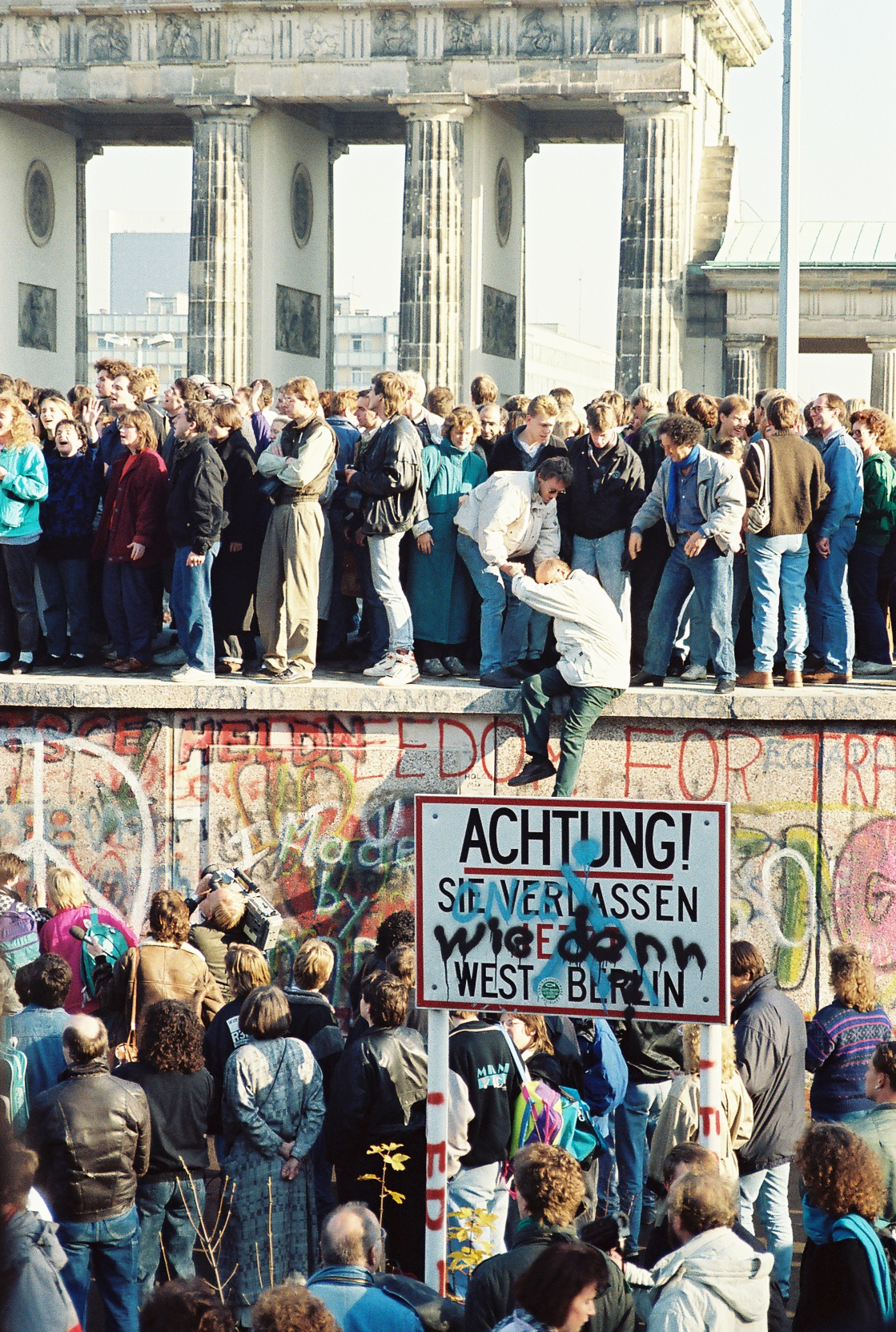
Berlin Wall at the Brandenburg Gate on 10 November 1989 showing the graffiti Wie denn ("How now") over the sign warning the public that they are leaving West Berlin

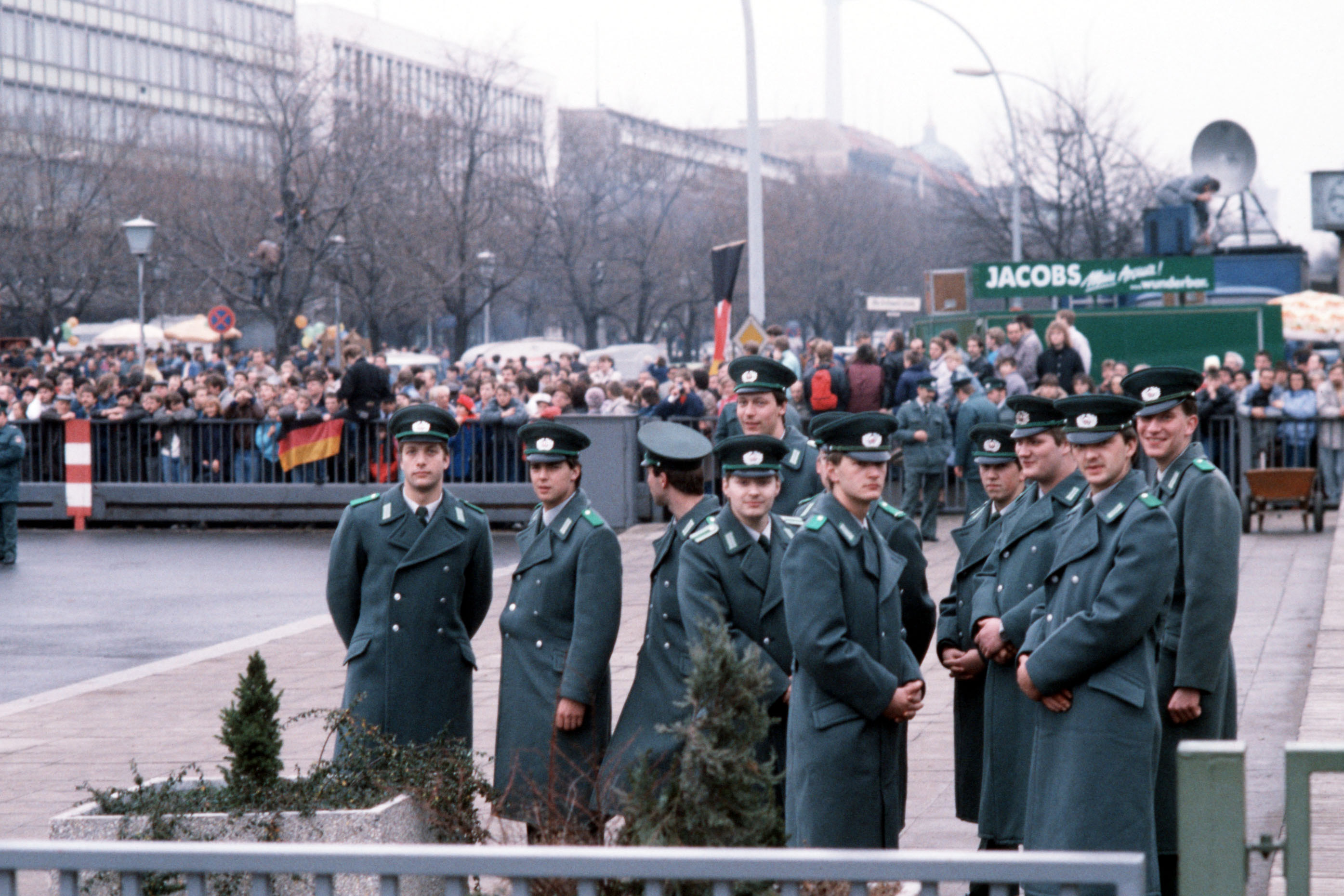
Police officers of the East German Volkspolizei wait for the official opening of the Brandenburg Gate of the Berlin Wall on 22 December 1989.

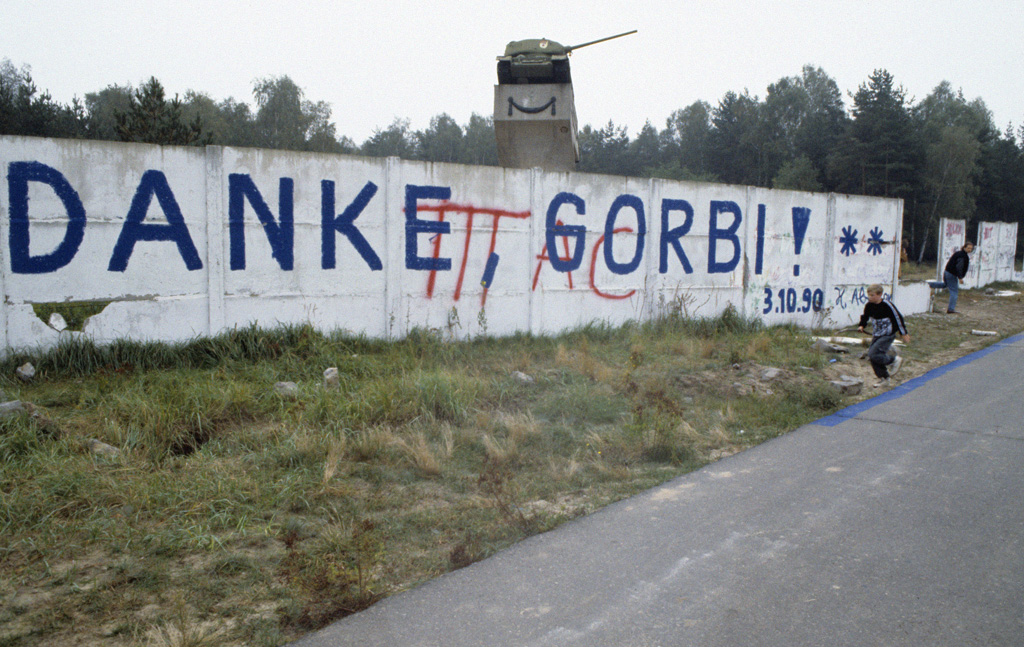
Berlin Wall, October 1990, saying "Thank you, Gorbi!"

On 28 November 1989—two weeks after the fall of the Berlin Wall—West German Chancellor Helmut Kohl announced a 10-point program calling for the two Germanies to expand their cooperation with a view toward eventual reunification.

Initially, no timetable was proposed. However, events rapidly came to a head in early 1990. First, in March, the Party of Democratic Socialism—the former Socialist Unity Party of Germany—was heavily defeated in East Germany's first free elections. A grand coalition was formed under Lothar de Maizière, leader of the East German wing of Kohl's Christian Democratic Union, on a platform of speedy reunification. Second, East Germany's economy and infrastructure underwent a swift and near-total collapse. Although East Germany was long reckoned as having the most robust economy in the Soviet bloc, the removal of Communist hegemony revealed the ramshackle foundations of that system. The East German mark had been almost worthless outside East Germany for some time before the events of 1989–1990, and the collapse of the East German economy further magnified the problem.

=== Economic merger ===
Discussions immediately began on an emergency merger of the German economies. On 18 May 1990, the two German states signed a treaty agreeing on monetary, economic, and social union. This treaty is called Vertrag über die Schaffung einer Währungs-, Wirtschafts- und Sozialunion zwischen der Deutschen Demokratischen Republik und der Bundesrepublik Deutschland ("Treaty Establishing a Monetary, Economic and Social Union between the German Democratic Republic and the Federal Republic of Germany"); it came into force on 1 July 1990, with the West German Deutsche Mark replacing the East German mark as the official currency of East Germany. The Deutsche Mark had a very high reputation among the East Germans and was considered stable. While the GDR transferred its financial policy sovereignty to West Germany, the West started granting subsidies for the GDR budget and social security system. At the same time, many West German laws came into force in the GDR. This created a suitable framework for a political union by diminishing the huge gap between the two existing political, social, and economic systems.

=== German Reunification Treaty ===
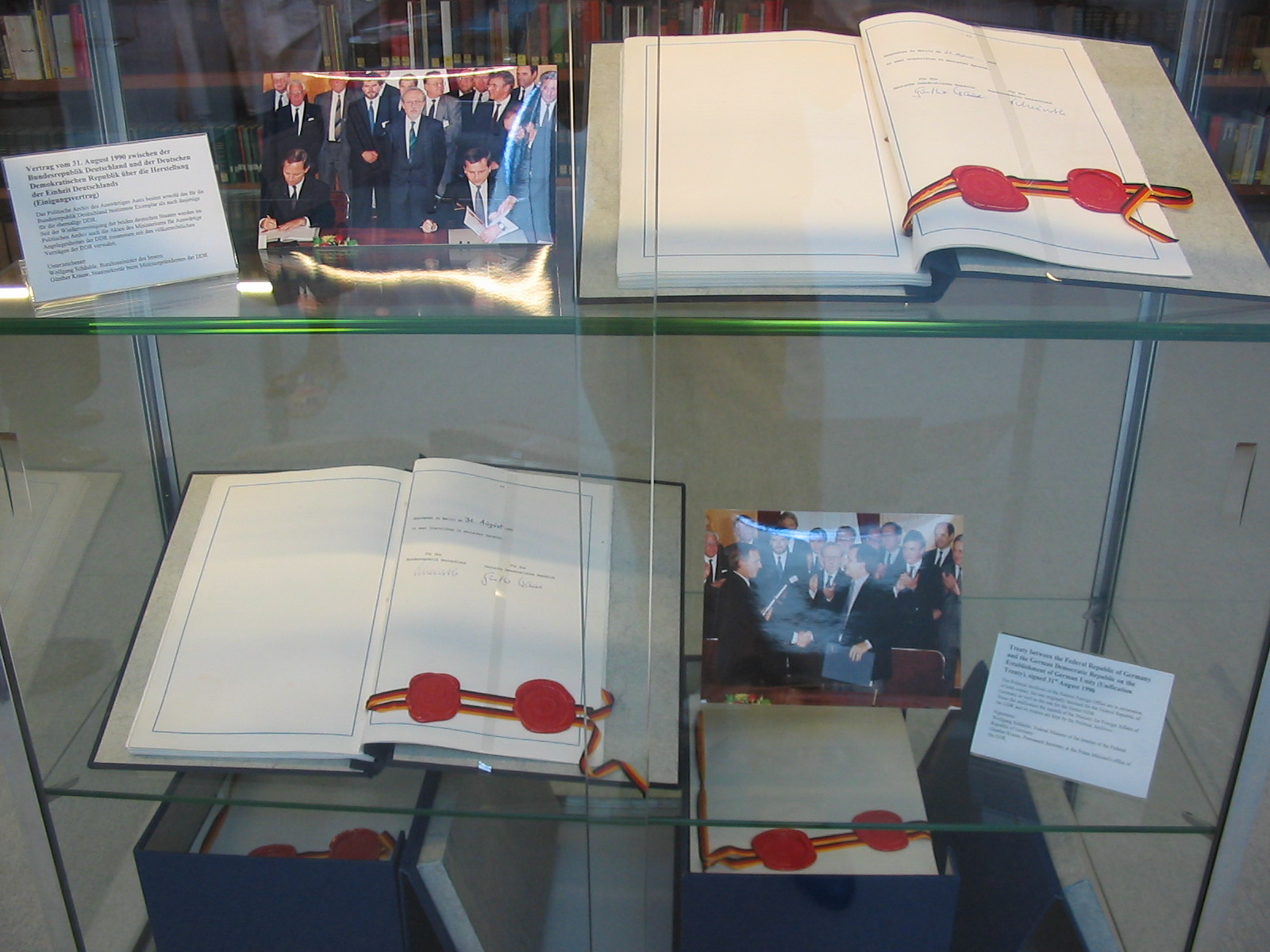
The two original copies of the Unification Treaty signed on 31 August 1990. West German Interior Minister Wolfgang Schäuble signed for the FRG and the East German State Secretary Günther Krause signed for the GDR.

The Volkskammer, the Parliament of East Germany, passed a resolution on 23 August 1990 declaring the accession (Beitritt) of the German Democratic Republic to the Federal Republic of Germany, and the extension of the field of application of the Federal Republic's Basic Law to the territory of East Germany as allowed by Article 23 of the West German Basic Law, effective 3 October 1990. This Declaration of Accession (Beitrittserklärung) was formally presented by the President of the Volkskammer, Sabine Bergmann-Pohl, to the President of the West German Bundestag, Rita Süssmuth, by means of a letter dated 25 August 1990. Thus, formally, the procedure of reunification by means of the accession of East Germany to West Germany, and of East Germany's acceptance of the Basic Law already in force in West Germany, was initiated as the unilateral, sovereign decision of East Germany, as allowed by the provisions of article 23 of the West German Basic Law as it then existed.

In the wake of that resolution of accession, the "German reunification treaty", commonly known in German as "Einigungsvertrag" (Unification Treaty) or "Wiedervereinigungsvertrag" (Reunification Treaty), that had been negotiated between the two German states since 2 July 1990, was signed by representatives of the two governments on 31 August 1990. This Treaty, officially titled Vertrag zwischen der Bundesrepublik Deutschland und der Deutschen Demokratischen Republik über die Herstellung der Einheit Deutschlands (Treaty between the Federal Republic of Germany and the German Democratic Republic on the Establishment of German Unity), was approved by large majorities in the legislative chambers of both countries on 20 September 1990 (440–47 in the West German Bundestag and 299–80 in the East German Volkskammer). The Treaty passed the West German Bundesrat on the following day, 21 September 1990. The amendments to the Federal Republic's Basic Law that were foreseen in the Unification Treaty or necessary for its implementation were adopted by the Federal Statute of 23 September 1990, that enacted the incorporation of the Treaty as part of the Law of the Federal Republic of Germany. The said Federal Statute, containing the whole text of the Treaty and its Protocols as an annex, was published in the Bundesgesetzblatt (the official journal for the publication of the laws of the Federal Republic) on 28 September 1990. In the German Democratic Republic, the constitutional law (Verfassungsgesetz) giving effect to the Treaty was also published on 28 September 1990. With the adoption of the Treaty as part of its Constitution, East Germany legislated its own abolition as a separate state.

Under article 45 of the Treaty, it entered into force according to international law on 29 September 1990, upon the exchange of notices regarding the completion of the respective internal constitutional requirements for the adoption of the treaty in both East Germany and West Germany. With that last step, and in accordance with article 1 of the Treaty, and in conformity with East Germany's Declaration of Accession presented to the Federal Republic, Germany was officially reunited at 00:00 CEST on 3 October 1990. East Germany joined the Federal Republic as the five Länder (states) of Brandenburg, Mecklenburg-Western Pomerania, Saxony, Saxony-Anhalt, and Thuringia. These states were the five original states of East Germany, but were abolished in 1952 in favor of a centralized system. As part of the 18 May treaty, the five East German states were reconstituted on 23 August. East Berlin, the capital of East Germany, reunited with West Berlin, a de facto part of West Germany, in order to form the city of Berlin, which joined the Federal Republic as its third city-state alongside Bremen and Hamburg. Berlin was still formally under Allied occupation (that would only be terminated later, as a result of the provisions of the Two Plus Four Treaty), but the city's administrative merger and inclusion in the enlarged Federal Republic as its capital, effective on 3 October 1990, had been greenlit by the four Allies, and were formally approved in the final meeting of the Allied Control Council on 2 October 1990. In an emotional ceremony, at the stroke of midnight on 3 October 1990, the black-red-gold flag of West Germany—now the flag of a reunited Germany—was raised above the Brandenburg Gate, marking the moment of German reunification.

=== Constitutional merger ===
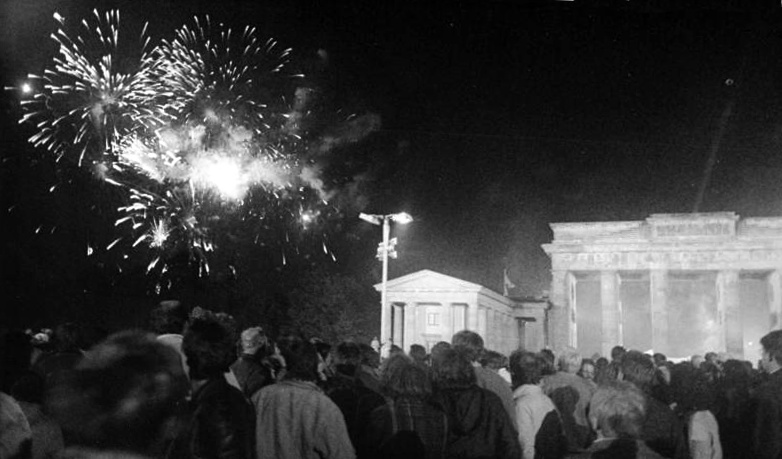
Fireworks at Brandenburg Gate after the reunification

The process chosen was one of the two options set out in the West German constitution (Grundgesetz or Basic Law) of 1949 to facilitate eventual reunification. The Basic Law stated that it was only intended for temporary use until a permanent constitution could be adopted by the German people as a whole. Under that document's (then existing) Article 23, any new prospective Länder could adhere to the Basic Law by a simple majority vote. The initial 11 joining states of 1949 (down to 9 in 1952 with foundation of Baden-Württemberg) constituted the Trizone. West Berlin had been proposed as the 12th state, but this was legally inhibited by Allied objections since Berlin as a whole was legally a quadripartite occupied area. Despite this, West Berlin's political affiliation was with West Germany, and, in many fields, it functioned de facto as if it were a component state of West Germany. On 1 January 1957, before the reunification, the territory of Saarland, a protectorate of France (1947–1956), united with West Germany (and thus rejoined Germany) as the tenth state of the Federal Republic; this was called "Little Reunification" although the Saar Protectorate itself was only one disputed territory, as its existence was opposed by the Soviet Union.

The other option was set out in Article 146, which provided a mechanism for a permanent constitution for a reunified Germany. This route would have entailed a formal union between two German states that then would have had, among other things, to create a new constitution for the newly established country. However, by the spring of 1990, it was apparent that drafting a new constitution would require protracted negotiations that would open up numerous issues in West Germany. Even without this to consider, by the start of 1990 East Germany was in a state of economic and political collapse. In contrast, reunification under Article 23 could be implemented in as little as six months. Ultimately, when the treaty on monetary, economic, and social union was signed, it was decided to use the quicker process of Article 23. By this process, East Germany voted to dissolve itself and to join West Germany, and the area in which the Basic Law was in force was simply extended to include its constituent parts. Thus, while legally East Germany as a whole acceded to the Federal Republic, the constituent parts of East Germany entered into the Federal Republic as five new states, which held their first elections on 14 October 1990.

Nevertheless, although the Volkskammer's declaration of accession to the Federal Republic had initiated the process of reunification, the act of reunification itself (with its many specific terms, conditions, and qualifications, some of which required amendments to the Basic Law itself) was achieved constitutionally by the subsequent Unification Treaty of 31 August 1990; that is, through a binding agreement between the former GDR and the Federal Republic now recognizing each another as separate sovereign states in international law. This treaty was then voted into effect by both the Volkskammer and the Bundestag by the constitutionally required two-thirds majorities, effecting on the one hand, the extinction of the GDR, and on the other, the agreed amendments to the Basic Law of the Federal Republic. Hence, although the GDR declared its accession to the Federal Republic under Article 23 of the Basic Law, this did not imply its acceptance of the Basic Law as it then stood, but rather of the Basic Law as subsequently amended in line with the Unification Treaty.

Legally, the reunification did not create a third state out of the two. Rather, West Germany effectively absorbed East Germany. Accordingly, on Unification Day, 3 October 1990, the German Democratic Republic ceased to exist, and five new federated states on its former territory joined the Federal Republic of Germany. East and West Berlin were reunited as the third full-fledged federated city-state of the enlarged Federal Republic. The reunited city became the capital of the enlarged Federal Republic. Under this model, the Federal Republic of Germany, now enlarged to include the five states of the former GDR plus the reunified Berlin, continued to exist under the same legal personality that was founded in May 1949.

While the Basic Law was modified, rather than replaced by a constitution as such, it still permits the adoption of a formal constitution by the German people at some time in the future.

=== Unification of Berlin ===
In the context of urban planning, in addition to a wealth of new opportunity and the symbolism of two former independent states being rejoined, the reunification of Berlin presented numerous challenges. The city underwent massive redevelopment, involving the political, economic, and cultural environment of both East and West Berlin. However, the "scar" left by the Wall, which ran directly through the very heart of the city, had consequences for the urban environment that planning still needs to address.

The unification of Berlin presented legal, political, and technical challenges for the urban environment. The political division and physical separation of the city for more than 30 years saw the East and the West develop their own distinct urban forms, with many of these differences still visible to this day. As urban planning in Germany is the responsibility of the city government, the integration of East and West Berlin was in part complicated by the fact that the existing planning frameworks became obsolete with the fall of the Wall. Prior to the reunification of the city, the Land Use Plan of 1988 and General Development Plan of 1980 defined the spatial planning criteria for West and East Berlin, respectively. These were replaced by the new, unified Land Use Plan in 1994. Termed "Critical Reconstruction", the new policy aimed to revive Berlin's prewar aesthetic; it was complemented by a strategic planning document for downtown Berlin, entitled "Inner City Planning Framework".

Following the dissolution of the GDR on 3 October 1990, all planning projects under the socialist-totalitarian regime were abandoned. Vacant lots, open areas, and empty fields in East Berlin were subject to redevelopment, in addition to space previously occupied by the Wall and associated buffer zone. Many of these sites were positioned in central, strategic locations of the reunified city.

=== German Unity Day ===
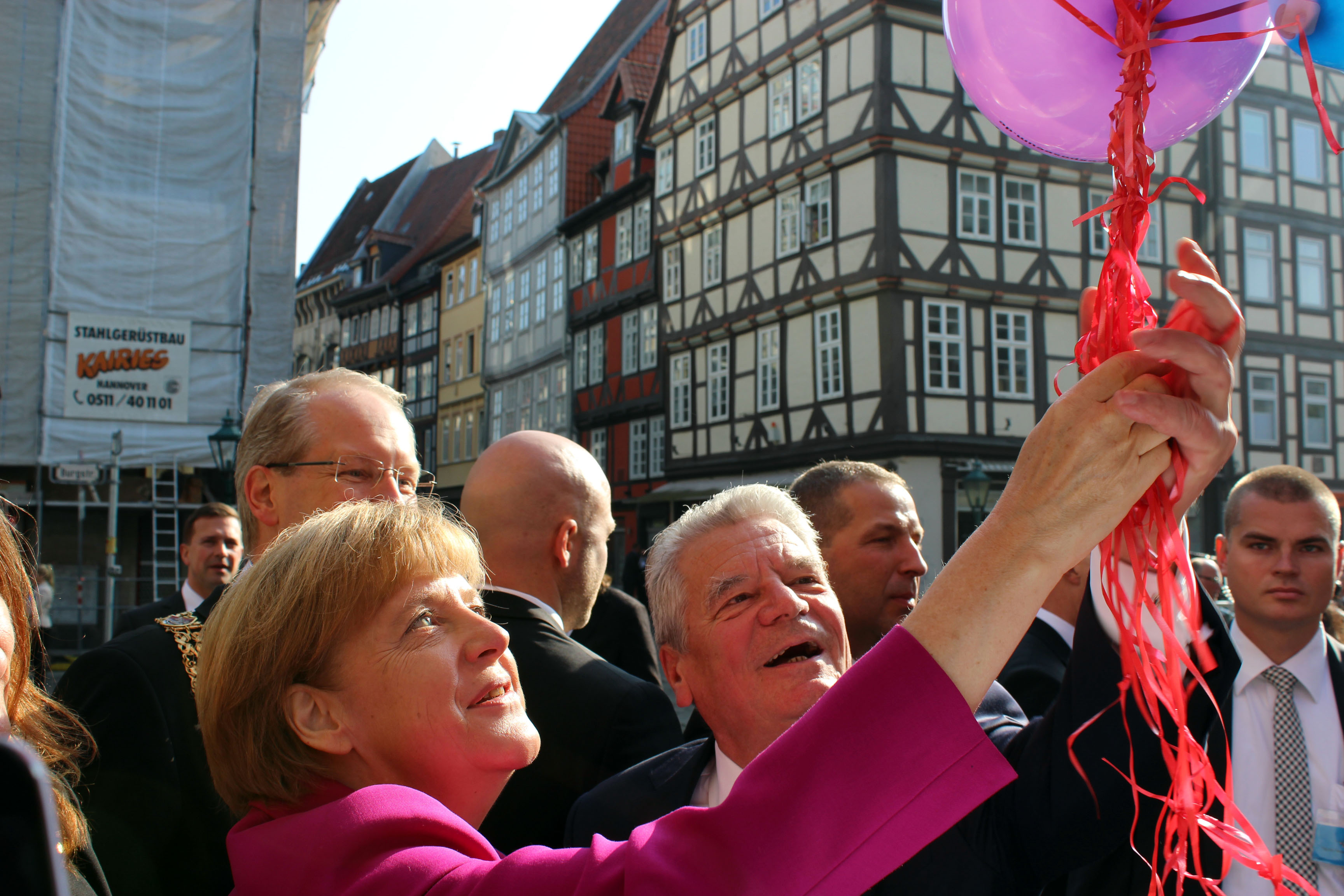
Chancellor Angela Merkel and President Joachim Gauck at the Bürgerfest (German Unity Day festivities) in Hannover in 2014

To commemorate the day that marks the official unification of the former East and West Germany in 1990, 3 October has since then been the official national holiday of Germany, the German Unity Day (Tag der deutschen Einheit). It replaced the previous national holiday held in West Germany on 17 June commemorating the East German uprising of 1953 and the national holiday on 7 October in the GDR, that commemorated the Foundation of the East German state. An alternative date to commemorate the reunification could have been the day the Berlin Wall came down, 9 November (1989), which coincided with the anniversary of the proclamation of the German Republic in 1918, and the defeat of Hitler's first coup in 1923. However, 9 November was also the anniversary of the first large-scale Nazi-led pogroms against Jews in 1938 (Kristallnacht), so the day was considered inappropriate for a national holiday.

== Domestic opposition ==
Throughout the entire Cold War and until 1990, reunification did not appear likely, and the existence of two German countries was commonly regarded as an established, unalterable fact. Helmut Kohl briefly addressed this issue during the 1983 West German federal election, stating that despite his belief in German national unity, it would not mean a "return to the nation-state of earlier times". In the 1980s, opposition to a united German country and support for lasting peaceful coexistence between the two German countries were very common amongst left-wing parties of West Germany, especially the SPD and Greens. The division of Germany was considered necessary to maintain peace in Europe, and the emergence of another German state was also seen as possibly dangerous to the West German democracy. A German publicist Peter Bender wrote in 1981: "Considering the role Germany played in the origins of both World Wars, Europe cannot, and the Germans should not, want a new German Reich, a sovereign nation-state. That is the logic of history which is, as Bismarck noted, more exact than the Prussian government audit office." Opinion on reunification was not only highly partisan, but polarised along many social divides—Germans aged 35 or younger were opposed to unification, whereas older respondents were more supportive; likewise, low-income Germans tended to oppose reunification, whereas more affluent responders were likely to support it. Ultimately, a poll in July 1990 found that the main motivation for reunification was economic concern rather than nationalism.

Opinion polls in the late 1980s showed that young East Germans and West Germans saw each other as foreign, and did not regard themselves as a single nation. Heinrich August Winkler observes that "an evaluation of the corresponding data in the Deutschland Archive in 1989 showed that the GDR was perceived by a large portion of the younger generation as a foreign nation with a different social order which was no longer a part of Germany". Winkler argues that the reunification was not a product of popular opinion, but rather "crisis management on the highest level". Support for unified Germany fell once the prospect of it became a tangible reality in the fall of 1989. A December 1989 poll by Der Spiegel indicated strong support for preserving East Germany as a separate state. However, SED members were overrepresented amongst the responders, constituting 13% of the population, but 23% of those polled. Reporting on a student protest in East Berlin on 4 November 1989, Elizabeth Pond noted that "virtually none of the demonstrators interviewed by Western reporters said they wanted unification with the Federal Republic". In West Germany, once it became clear that a course of quick unification was negotiated, the public responded with concern. In February 1990, two-thirds of West Germans considered the pace of unification as "too fast". West Germans were also hostile towards the newcomers from the East—according to an April 1990 poll, only 11% of West Germans welcomed the refugees from East Germany.

After unification, the national divide persisted—a survey by the Allensbach Institute in April 1993 found that only 22% of West Germans and 11% of East Germans felt they were one nation. Dolores L. Augustine observed that "the sense of oneness felt by East Germans and West Germans in the euphoric period after the fall of the wall proved all too transitory", as the old divisions persisted and Germans not only still saw themselves as two separate people, but also acted in accordance with their separate, regional interests. This state of mind became known as Mauer im Kopf ("wall in the head"), suggesting that despite the fall of the Berlin Wall, a "psychological wall" still existed between East and West Germans. Augustine argues that despite resistance to the political regime of East Germany, it still represented the history and identity of East Germans. Unification caused backlash, and the Treuhandanstalt, an agency created to carry out privatization, was blamed for creating mass unemployment and poverty in the East.

=== Social groups and figures ===
An influential part of the reunification opponents were the so-called Anti-Germans. Emerging from the student Left, Anti-Germans were supportive of Israel and strongly opposed German nationalism, arguing that an emergence of a united German state would also result in a return of fascism (Nazism). They considered the social and political dynamics of 1980s and 1990s Germany to be comparable to those of the 1930s, denouncing the emerging anti-Zionism, unification sentiments and reemergence of pan-Germanism. Hermann L. Gremliza, who left the SPD in 1989 because of its support for German unification, was repulsed by the universal support for unification amongst most major parties, stating that it reminded him of "Social Democrats joining the National Socialists (Nazis) in singing the German national anthem in 1933, following Hitler's declaration of his foreign policy." Several thousand people joined the Anti-Germans' 1990 protests against German reunification.

According to Stephen Brockmann, German reunification was feared and opposed by ethnic minorities, particularly those of East Germany. He observes that "right-wing violence was on the rise throughout 1990 in the GDR, with frequent instances of beatings, rapes, and fights connected with xenophobia", which led to a police lockdown in Leipzig on the night of reunification. Tensions with Poland were high, and many internal ethnic minorities such as the Sorbs feared further displacement or assimilationist policies; the Sorbs had received legal protection in the GDR and feared that the rights granted to them in East Germany would not be included in the law of an eventual united Germany. Ultimately, no provision on the protection of ethnic minorities was included in the post-unification reform of the Basic Law in 1994. While politicians called for acceptance of a new multiethnic society, many were unwilling to "give up its traditional racial definition of German nationality". Feminist groups also opposed the unification, as abortion laws were less restrictive in East Germany than in West Germany, and the progress that the GDR had made in regard to women's welfare such as legal equality, child care and financial support were "all less impressive or non-existent in the West". Opposition was also prevalent amongst Jewish circles, who had special status and rights in East Germany. Some Jewish intellectuals such as Günter Kunert expressed concern of Jews being portrayed as part of the East German socialist elites, given that the Jews had unique rights, such as being allowed to travel west.

There was also a significant opposition to the unification in intellectual circles. Christa Wolf and Manfred Stolpe stressed the need to forge an East German identity, while "citizens' initiatives, church groups, and intellectuals of the first hour began issuing dire warnings about a possible Anschluss of the GDR by the Federal Republic". Many East German oppositionists and reformers advocated for a "third path" of an independent, democratic socialist East Germany. Stefan Heym argued that the preservation of the GDR was necessary to achieve the ideal of democratic socialism, urging East Germans to oppose "capitalist annexation" in favour of a democratic socialist society. In an attempt to preserve possibility for an independent socialist Germany, Wolf, Heym, and a union of left-wing writers of GDR issued the appeal "For Our Country" on November 28, 1989, to try to convince East Germans a possible future of socialist Germany. The appeal managed to gather over 1 million approvals by January, 1990, which is unprecedented in the history of GDR. Writers in both East and West were concerned about the destruction of the East German or West German cultural identity respectively; in "Goodbye to the Literature of the Federal Republic", Frank Schirrmacher states that the literature of both states had been central to the consciousness and unique identity of both nations, with this newly developed culture being now endangered by looming reunification. David Gress remarked that there was "an influential view found largely, but by no means only, on the German and international left" which saw "the drive for unification as either sinister, masking a revival of aggressive nationalist aspirations, or materialist".

Günter Grass, who won the Nobel Prize in Literature in 1999, also expressed his vehement opposition to the unification of Germany, citing his tragic memories of World War II as the reason. According to Grass, the emergence of National Socialism and the Holocaust had deprived Germany of its right to exist as a unified nation state: he wrote: "Historical responsibility dictates opposition to reunification, no matter how inevitable it may seem." He also claimed that "national victory threatens a cultural defeat", as "blooming of German culture and philosophy is possible only at times of fruitful national disunity", and also cited Johann Wolfgang von Goethe's opposition to the first unification of Germany in 1871: Goethe wrote: "Frankfurt, Bremen, Hamburg, Lübeck are large and brilliant, and their impact on the prosperity of Germany is incalculable. Yet, would they remain what they are if they were to lose their independence and be incorporated as provincial cities into one great German Empire? I have reason to doubt this." Grass also condemned the unification as philistinist and purely materialist, calling it "the monetary fetish, by now devoid of all joy." Heiner Müller supported Grass' criticism of the unification process, warning East Germans: "We will be a nation without dreams, we will lose our memories, our past, and therefore also our ability to hope." British historian Richard J. Evans made a similar argument, criticizing the unification as driven solely by "consumerist appetites whetted by years of watching West German television advertisements".

== Foreign support and opposition ==
For decades, West Germany's allies stated their support for reunification. Israeli Prime Minister Yitzhak Shamir, who speculated that a country that "decided to kill millions of Jewish people" in the Holocaust "will try to do it again", was one of the few world leaders to publicly oppose it. As reunification became a realistic possibility, however, significant NATO and European opposition emerged in private.

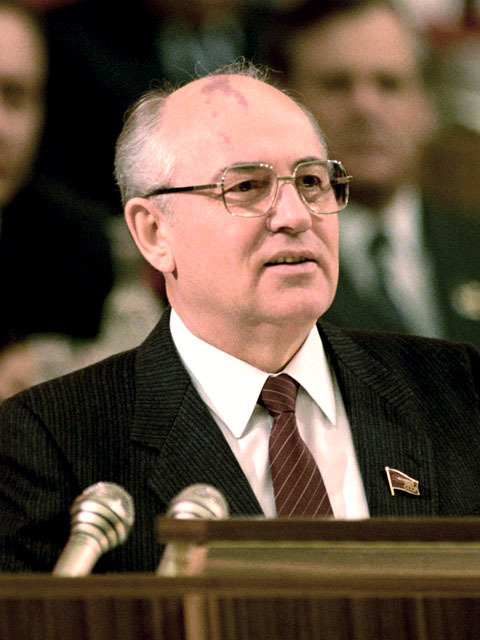
Soviet leader Mikhail Gorbachev had initially called for a united but neutral Germany.

A poll of four countries in January 1990 found that a majority of surveyed Americans and French supported reunification, while British and Poles were more divided: 69 percent of Poles and 50 percent of French and British stated that they worried about a reunified Germany becoming "the dominant power in Europe". Those surveyed stated several concerns, including Germany again attempting to expand its territory, a revival of Nazism, and the German economy becoming too powerful. While British, French, and Americans favored Germany remaining a member of NATO, a majority of Poles supported neutrality for the reunified state.

The key ally was the United States. Although some top American officials opposed quick unification, Secretary of State James A. Baker and President George H. W. Bush provided strong and decisive support to Kohl's proposals. (Note: Kristina Spohr reports that German historian Werner Weidenfeld says that Bush fully trusted Kohl and made the United States his most important ally in the unification process.)

=== United Kingdom and France ===
We defeated the Germans twice! And now they're back!

— Margaret Thatcher, December 1989

British Prime Minister Margaret Thatcher was one of the most vehement opponents of German reunification. Before the fall of the Berlin Wall, Thatcher told Soviet General Secretary Mikhail Gorbachev that neither the United Kingdom nor, according to her, Western Europe, wanted the reunification of Germany. Thatcher also clarified that she wanted the Soviet leader to do what he could to stop it, telling Gorbachev, "We do not want a united Germany". Although she welcomed East German democracy, Thatcher worried that a rapid reunification might weaken Gorbachev, and she favored Soviet troops staying in East Germany as long as possible to act as a counterweight to a united Germany.

Thatcher, who carried in her handbag a map of Germany's 1937 borders to show others the "German problem", feared that Germany's "national character", size, and central location in Europe would cause it to be a "destabilizing rather than a stabilizing force in Europe". In December 1989, she warned fellow European Community leaders at a Council summit in Strasbourg which Kohl attended, "We defeated the Germans twice! And now they're back!". Although Thatcher had stated her support for German self-determination in 1985, she now argued that Germany's allies only supported reunification because they did not believe it would ever happen. Thatcher favored a transition period of five years for reunification, during which the two Germanies would remain separate states. Although she gradually softened her opposition, as late as March 1990, Thatcher summoned historians and diplomats to a seminar at Chequers to ask "How dangerous are the Germans?", and the French ambassador in London reported that Thatcher told him, "France and Great Britain should pull together today in the face of the German threat."

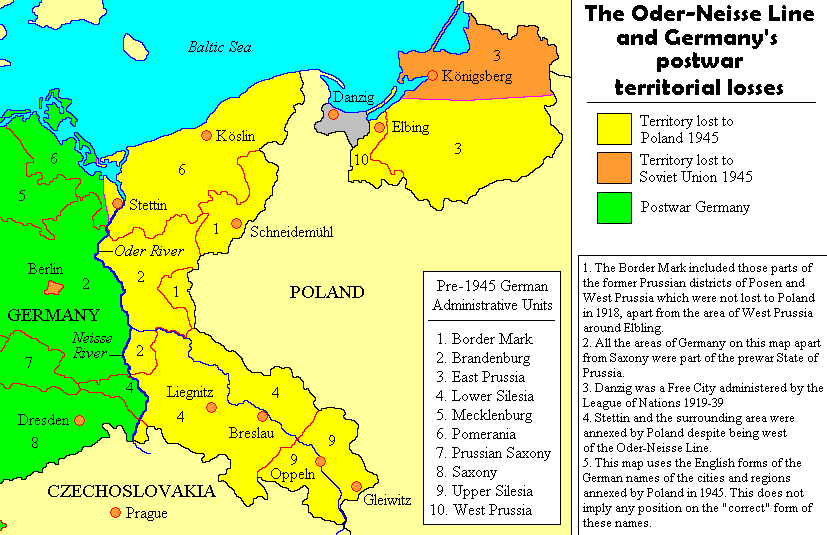
Former eastern territories of Germany (yellow and orange)

The pace of events surprised the French, whose Foreign Ministry had concluded in October 1989 that reunification "does not appear realistic at this moment". A representative of French President François Mitterrand reportedly told an aide to Gorbachev, "France by no means wants German reunification, although it realises that in the end, it is inevitable." At the Strasbourg summit, Mitterrand and Thatcher discussed the fluidity of Germany's historical borders. On 20 January 1990, Mitterrand told Thatcher that a unified Germany could "make more ground than even Adolf had". He predicted that "bad" Germans would reemerge, which might seek to regain former German territory lost after World War II and would likely dominate Hungary, Poland, and Czechoslovakia, leaving "only Romania and Bulgaria for the rest of us". The two leaders saw no way to prevent reunification, however, as "None of us was going to declare war on Germany". Mitterrand recognized before Thatcher that reunification was inevitable and adjusted his views accordingly; unlike her, he was hopeful that participation in a single currency and other European institutions could control a united Germany. Mitterrand still wanted Thatcher to publicly oppose unification, however, to obtain more concessions from Germany.

=== Rest of Europe ===
I love Germany so much that I prefer to see two of them.

— Giulio Andreotti, Prime Minister of Italy, quoting François Mauriac

Ireland's Taoiseach, Charles Haughey, supported German reunification and he took advantage of Ireland's presidency of the European Economic Community to call for an extraordinary European summit in Dublin in April 1990 to calm the fears held of fellow members of the EEC. Haughey saw similarities between Ireland and Germany, and said "I have expressed a personal view that coming as we do from a country which is also divided many of us would have sympathy with any wish of the people of the two German States for unification". Der Spiegel later described other European leaders' opinion of reunification at the time as "icy". Italy's Giulio Andreotti warned against a revival of "pan-Germanism" and the Netherlands' Ruud Lubbers questioned the German right to self-determination. They shared the United Kingdom's and France's concerns over a return to German militarism and the economic power of a reunified country. The consensus opinion was that reunification, if it must occur, should not occur until at least 1995 and preferably much later. Andreotti, quoting François Mauriac, joked "I love Germany so much that I prefer to see two of them".

== Final settlement ==
The victors of World War II—France, the Soviet Union, the United Kingdom, and the United States, comprising the Four-Power Authorities—retained authority over Berlin, such as control over air travel and its political status. From the onset, the Soviet Union sought to use reunification as a way to push Germany out of NATO into neutrality, removing nuclear weapons from its territory. However, West Germany misinterpreted a 21 November 1989 diplomatic message on the topic to mean that the Soviet leadership already anticipated reunification only two weeks after the Wall's collapse. This belief, and the worry that his rival Genscher might act first, encouraged Kohl on 28 November to announce a detailed "Ten Point Program for Overcoming the Division of Germany and Europe". While his speech was very popular within West Germany, it caused concern among other European governments, with whom he had not discussed the plan.

The Americans did not share the Europeans' and Soviets' historical fears over German expansionism; Condoleezza Rice later recalled,

The United States—and President George H. W. Bush—recognized that Germany went through a long democratic transition. It was a good friend, it was a member of NATO. Any issues that existed in 1945, it seemed perfectly reasonable to lay them to rest. For us, the question wasn't should Germany unify? It was how and under what circumstances? We had no concern about a resurgent Germany...

The United States wished to ensure, however, that Germany would stay within NATO. In December 1989, the administration of President George H. W. Bush made a united Germany's continued NATO membership a requirement for supporting reunification. Kohl agreed, although less than 20 percent of West Germans supported remaining within NATO. Kohl also wished to avoid a neutral Germany, as he believed that would destroy NATO, cause the United States and Canada to leave Europe, and cause Britain and France to form an anti-German alliance. The United States increased its support of Kohl's policies, as it feared that otherwise Oskar Lafontaine, a critic of NATO, might become Chancellor. Horst Teltschik, Kohl's foreign policy advisor, later recalled that Germany would have paid "100 billion deutschmarks" if the Soviets demanded it. The USSR did not make such great demands, however, with Gorbachev stating in February 1990 that "[t]he Germans must decide for themselves what path they choose to follow". In May 1990, he repeated his remark in the context of NATO membership while meeting Bush, amazing both the Americans and Germans. This removed the last significant roadblock to Germany being free to choose its international alignments, though Kohl made no secret that he intended for the reunified Germany to inherit West Germany's seats in NATO and the EC.

During a NATO–Warsaw Pact conference in Ottawa, Canada; Genscher persuaded the four powers to treat the two Germanies as equals instead of defeated junior partners and for the six nations to negotiate alone. Although the Dutch, Italians, Spanish, and other NATO powers opposed such a structure, which meant that the alliance's boundaries would change without their participation, the six nations began negotiations in March 1990. After Gorbachev's May agreement on German NATO membership, the Soviets further agreed that Germany would be treated as an ordinary NATO country, with the exception that former East German territory would not have foreign NATO troops or nuclear weapons. In exchange, Kohl agreed to reduce the sizes of the militaries of both West and East Germany, renounce weapons of mass destruction, and accept the postwar Oder–Neisse line as Germany's eastern border. In addition, Germany agreed to pay about 55 billion deutschmarks to the Soviet Union in gifts and loans, the equivalent of eight days of the West German GDP. To oppose German reunification, the British insisted to the end, against Soviet opposition, that NATO be allowed to hold maneuvers in the former East Germany. Thatcher later wrote that her opposition to reunification had been an "unambiguous failure".

=== German sovereignty and withdrawal of the Allied Forces ===
On 15 March 1991, the Treaty on the Final Settlement with Respect to Germany—which had been signed in Moscow on 12 September 1990, by the two German states that then existed (East and West Germany) on one side and by the four principal Allied powers (the United Kingdom, France, the Soviet Union, and the United States) on the other—entered into force, having been ratified by the Federal Republic of Germany (after the unification, as the united Germany) and by the four Allied states. The entry into force of that treaty (also known as the "Two Plus Four Treaty", in reference to the two German states and four Allied governments that signed it) put an end to the remaining limitations on German sovereignty and the ACC that resulted from the post-World War II arrangements. After the Americans intervened, both the United Kingdom and France ratified the Treaty on the Final Settlement with Respect to Germany in September 1990. The Treaty entered into force on 15 March 1991, in accordance with Article 9 of the Two Plus Four Treaty, it entered into force as soon as all ratifications were deposited with the Government of Germany, thus finalizing the reunification for purposes of international law. The last party to ratify the treaty was the Soviet Union, which deposited its instrument of ratification on 15 March 1991. The Supreme Soviet of the USSR only gave its approval to the ratification of the treaty on 4 March 1991, after considerable debate. Even before the ratification of the Treaty, the operation of all quadripartite Allied institutions in Germany was suspended, with effect from the reunification of Germany on 3 October 1990 and pending the final ratification of the Two Plus Four Treaty, pursuant to a declaration signed in New York on 1 October 1990 by the foreign ministers of the four Allied Powers, which was witnessed by ministers of the two German states then in existence, and to which was appended the text of the Two Plus Four Treaty. However, the Soviets cited their occupation rights for the last time as late as 13 March 1991, just two days before the Treaty became effective, when the Honeckers were enabled by Soviet hardliners to flee Germany on a military jet to Moscow from the Soviet-controlled Sperenberg Airfield, with the German Federal Government being given just one hour's advance notice.

Under the treaty on final settlement (which should not be confused with the Unification Treaty which was signed only between the two German states), the last Allied forces still present in Germany left in 1994, in accordance with article 4 of the treaty, which set 31 December 1994 as the deadline for the withdrawal of the remaining Allied forces. The bulk of Russian ground forces left Germany on 25 June 1994 with a military parade of the 6th Guards Motor Rifle Brigade in Berlin. This was followed by the closure of the United States Army Berlin command on 12 July 1994, an event that was marked by a Casing of the Colors ceremony witnessed by President Bill Clinton. The withdrawal of the last Russian troops (the Russian Army's Western Group of Forces) was completed on 31 August 1994, and the event was marked by a military ceremony in the Treptow Park in Berlin, in the presence of Russian President Yeltsin and German Chancellor Kohl. Although the bulk of the British, American, and French Forces had left Germany even before the departure of the Russians, the Western Allies kept a presence in Berlin until the completion of the Russian withdrawal, and the ceremony marking the departure of the remaining Forces of the Western Allies was the last to take place: on 8 September 1994, a Farewell Ceremony in the courtyard of the Charlottenburg Palace, in the presence of British Prime Minister John Major, American Secretary of State Warren Christopher, French President François Mitterrand, and German Chancellor Helmut Kohl, marked the withdrawal of the British, American and French Occupation Forces from Berlin, and the termination of the Allied occupation in Germany. Thus, the Allied presence was removed a few months before the final deadline.

Article 5 banned the deployment of nuclear weapons in the territory previously controlled by the GDR, and also the stationing of non-German military personnel.

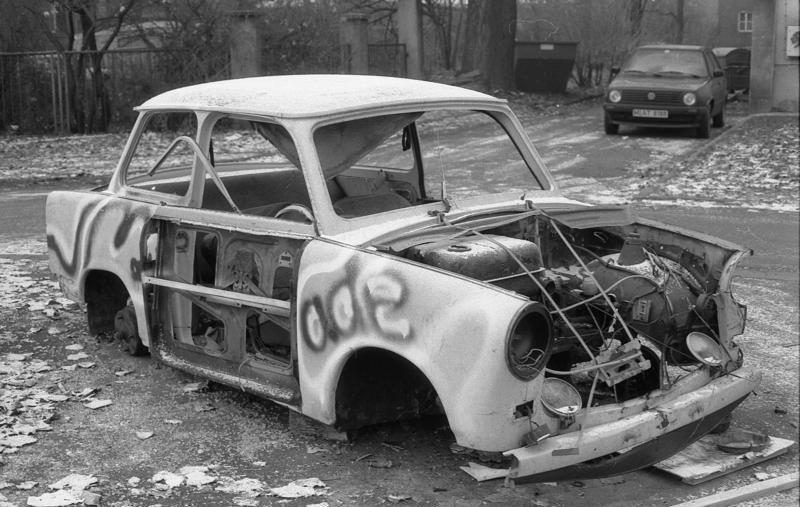
Many Trabant vehicles were abandoned in Germany after 1989 (this one photographed in Leipzig, 1990). A Volkswagen Golf can be seen parked in the background. Private brands like Volkswagen spilled over into East Germany after its state-owned auto industry collapsed.

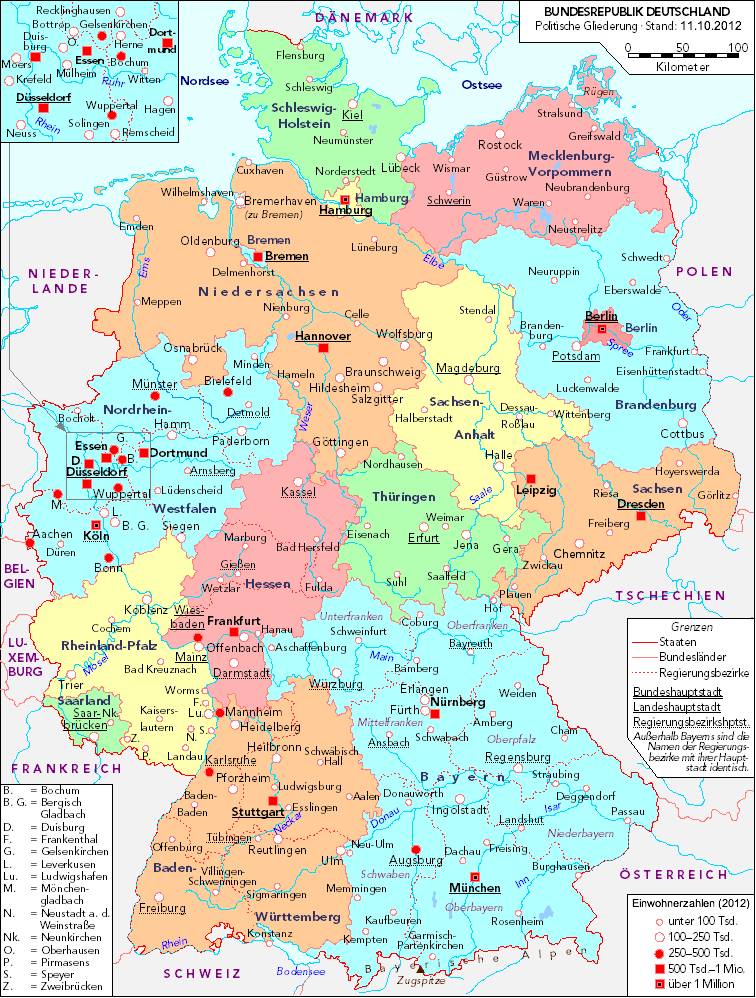
Current administrative map of Germany

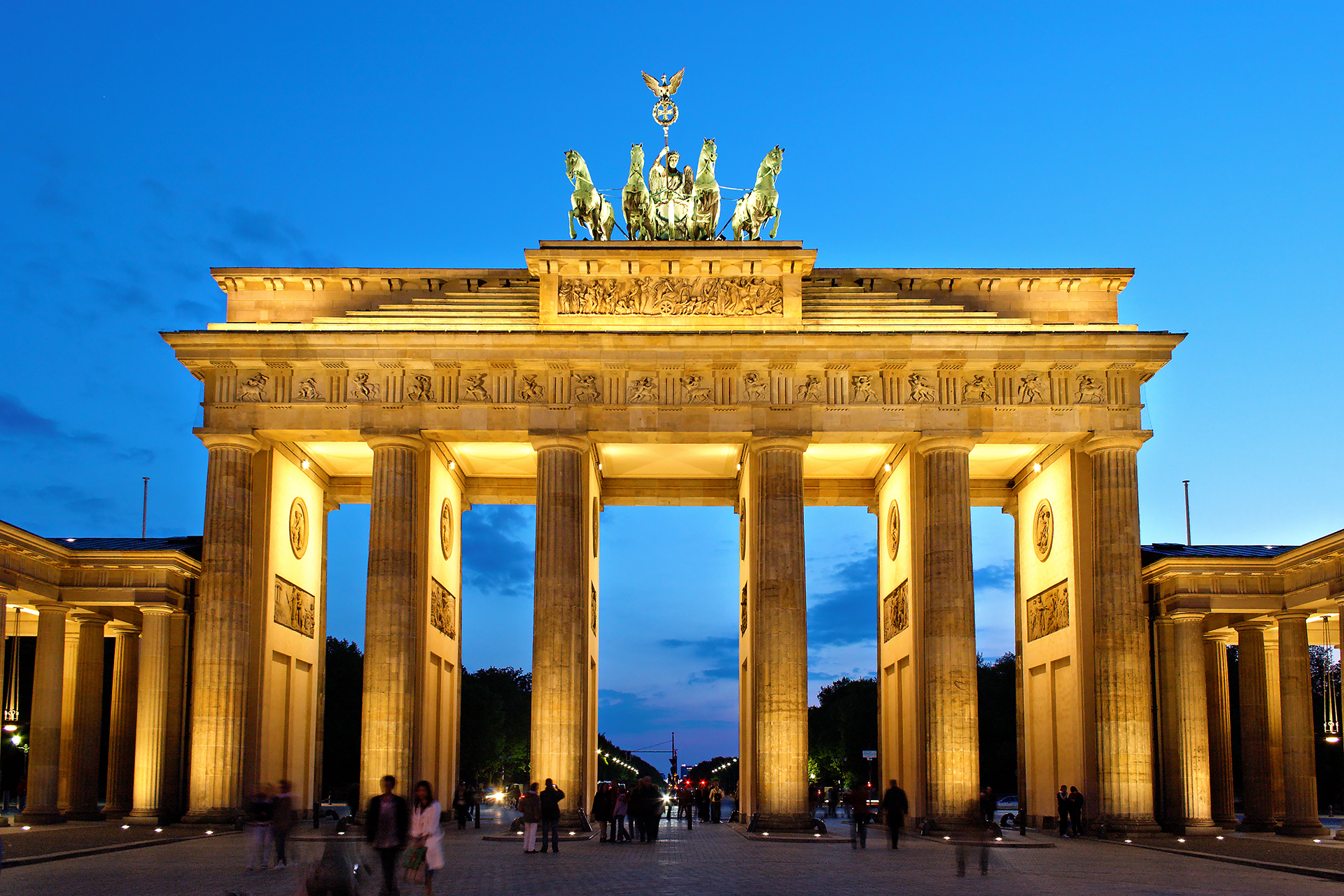
Brandenburg Gate in Berlin, national symbol of present-day Germany and its reunification in 1990

=== Polish border ===
On 14 November 1990, Germany and Poland signed the German–Polish Border Treaty, finalizing Germany's eastern boundary as permanent along the Oder–(Lusatian/Western) Neisse line, and thus renouncing any claims to most of Silesia, East Brandenburg, Farther Pomerania, and the southern area of the former province of East Prussia (they are called the "Recovered Territories" by Poland as they were once ruled by Piast Poland). (Note: The territory of the League of Nations mandate of the Free City of Danzig, annexed by Poland in 1945 and comprising the city of Gdańsk (Danzig) and a number of neighboring cities and municipalities, had never been claimed by any official side because West Germany followed the legal position of Germany in its borders of 1937, thus before the 13 March 1938 Nazi annexation of Austria.) The following month, the first all-German free elections since 1932 were held, resulting in an increased majority for the coalition government of Chancellor Helmut Kohl.

As for the German–Polish Border Treaty, it was approved by the Polish Sejm on 26 November 1991 and the German Bundestag on 16 December 1991, and entered into force with the exchange of the instruments of ratification on 16 January 1992. The confirmation of the border between Germany and Poland was required of Germany by the four Allied countries in the Two Plus Four Treaty. The Treaty was later supplemented by the Treaty of Good Neighbourship between the two countries which took effect on 16 January 1992 and ensured the few remaining Germans in Poland (in Upper Silesia) were treated better by the government.

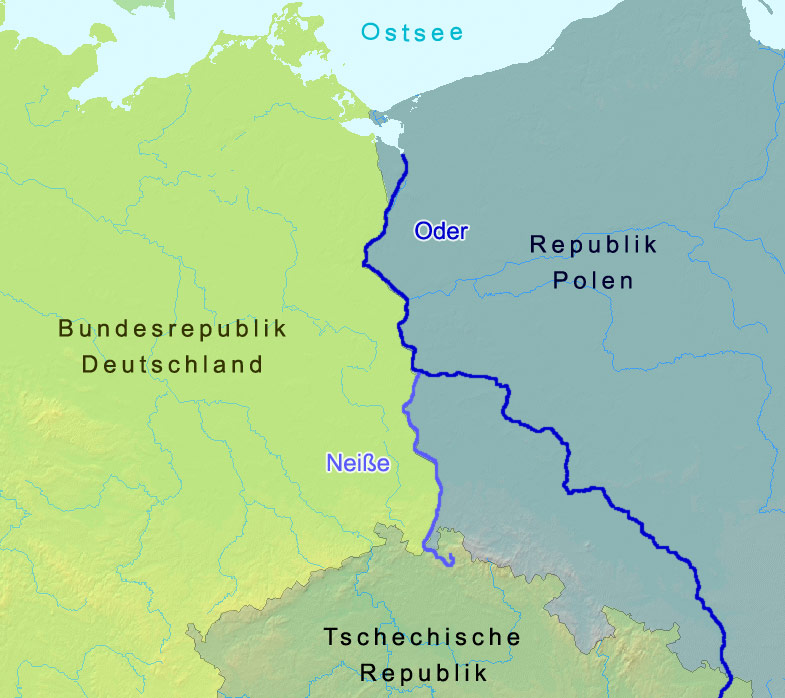
Oder–Neisse line between Germany and Poland

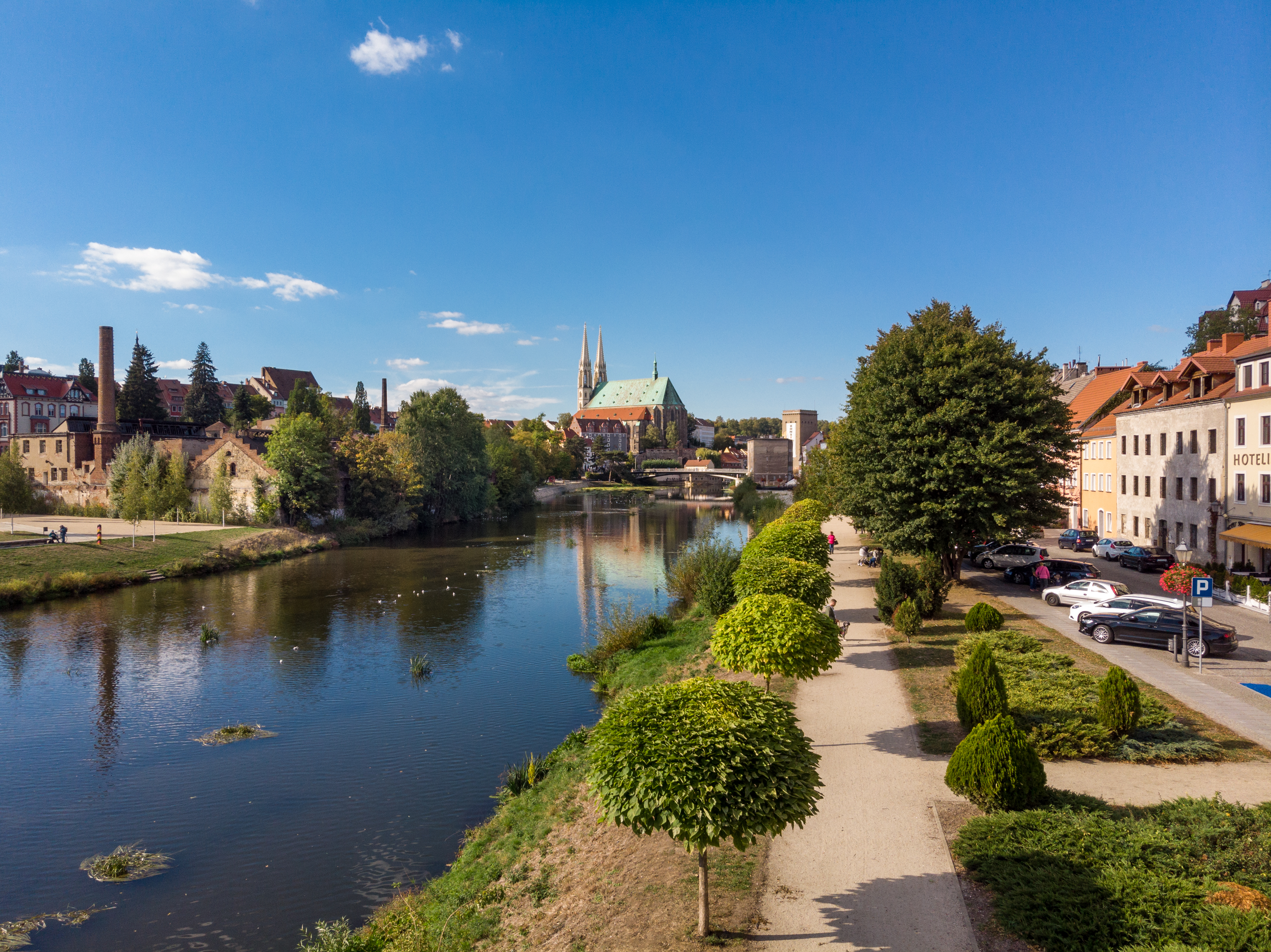
German-Polish border along the Western Neisse river between Zgorzelec of Poland and Görlitz, a city of Germany which belonged to the former Province of Lower Silesia

== Effects ==
=== International effects ===
The reunification made Germany into one of the world's great powers again. The newly unified Germany was not a new state, but was still the same Federal Republic of Germany that had previously been known as West Germany, meaning that it continued to hold all West Germany's seats at international organizations.

To facilitate this process and to reassure other countries, fundamental changes were made to the German constitution. The Preamble and Article 146 were amended, and Article 23 was replaced, but the deleted former Article 23 was applied as the constitutional model to be used for the 1990 reunification. Hence, prior to the five "New Länder" of East Germany joining, the Basic Law was amended to indicate that all parts of Germany would then be unified such that Germany could now no longer consider itself constitutionally open to further extension to include the former eastern territories of Germany, which were now parts of Poland and Russia (the German territory the former USSR annexed was a part of Russia – a Soviet member state) and were settled by Poles and Russians respectively. The changes effectively formalized the Oder–Neisse line as Germany's permanent eastern border. These amendments to the Basic Law were mandated by Article I, section 4 of the Two Plus Four Treaty.

=== Domestic effects ===
Vast differences between former East Germany and West Germany in lifestyle, wealth, political beliefs, and other matters remain, and it is therefore still common to speak of eastern and western Germany distinctly. It is often referred to as the "wall in the head" (Mauer im Kopf). Ossis (Easterners) are stereotyped as racist, poor, and largely influenced by Russian culture, while Wessis (Westerners) are usually considered snobbish, dishonest, wealthy, and selfish. East Germans indicate a dissatisfaction with the status quo and cultural alienation from the rest of Germany, and a sense that their cultural heritage is not acknowledged enough in the now unified Germany. The West, on the other hand, has become uninterested in what the East has to say, and this has led to more resentment toward the East, exacerbating the divide. Both the West and the East have failed to sustain an open-minded dialogue, and the failure to grasp the effects of the institutional path dependency has increased the frustration each side feels.

The economy of eastern Germany has struggled since unification, and large subsidies are still transferred from west to east. Economically, eastern Germany has had a sharp rise of 10 percent to West Germany's 5 percent. Western Germany also still holds 56 percent of the GDP. Part of this disparity between the East and the West lies in the Western labor unions' demand for high-wage pacts in an attempt to prevent "low-wage zones". This caused many Germans from the East to be outpriced in the market, adding to the slump in businesses in eastern Germany as well as the rising unemployment. The former East German area has often been compared to the underdeveloped Southern Italy and the Southern United States during Reconstruction after the American Civil War. While the economy of eastern Germany has recovered recently, the differences between East and West remain present.

Politicians and scholars have frequently called for a process of "inner reunification" of the two countries and asked whether there is "inner unification or continued separation". "The process of German unity has not ended yet", proclaimed Chancellor Angela Merkel, who grew up in East Germany, in 2009. Nevertheless, the question of this "inner reunification" has been widely discussed in the German public, politically, economically, culturally, and also constitutionally since 1989.

Politically, since the fall of the Berlin Wall, the successor party of the former East German socialist state party has become a major force in German politics. It was renamed PDS, and, later, merged with the Western leftist party WASG to form the Left Party (Die Linke).

Constitutionally, the Basic Law of West Germany (Grundgesetz) provided two pathways for unification. The first was the implementation of a new all-German constitution, safeguarded by a popular referendum. Actually, this was the original idea of the Grundgesetz in 1949: it was named a "basic law" instead of a "constitution" because it was considered provisional. (Note: In fact, a new constitution was drafted by a "round table" of dissidents and delegates from East German civil society only to be discarded later, a fact that upset many East German intellectuals.) The second way was more technical: the implementation of the constitution in the East, using a paragraph originally designed for the West German states (Bundesländer) in case of internal reorganization like the merger of two states. While this latter option was chosen as the most feasible one, the first option was partly regarded as a means to foster the "inner reunification". A public manifestation of coming to terms with the past (Vergangenheitsbewältigung) is the existence of the so-called Birthler-Behörde, the Federal Commissioner for the Stasi Records, which collects and maintains the files of the East German security apparatus.

The economic reconstruction of former East Germany following the reunification required large amounts of public funding which turned some areas into boom regions, although overall unemployment remains higher than in the former West. Unemployment was part of a process of deindustrialization starting rapidly after 1990. Causes for this process are disputed in political conflicts up to the present day. Most times bureaucracy and lack of efficiency of the East German economy are highlighted and the deindustrialization is seen as an inevitable outcome of the Wende. But many critics from East Germany point out that it was the shock-therapy style of privatization that did not leave room for East German enterprises to adapt, and that alternatives like a slow transition had been possible. (Note: For example, the economist Jörg Roesler. The historian Ulrich Busch pointed out that the currency union as such had come too early.)

Reunification did, however, lead to a large rise in the average standard of living in former East Germany, and a stagnation in the West as $2 trillion in public spending was transferred East. Between 1990 and 1995, gross wages in the east rose from 35 percent to 74 percent of western levels, while pensions rose from 40 percent to 79 percent. Unemployment reached double the western level as well. West German cities close to the former border of East and West Germany experienced a disproportionate loss of market access relative to other West German cities which were not as greatly affected by the reunification of Germany.

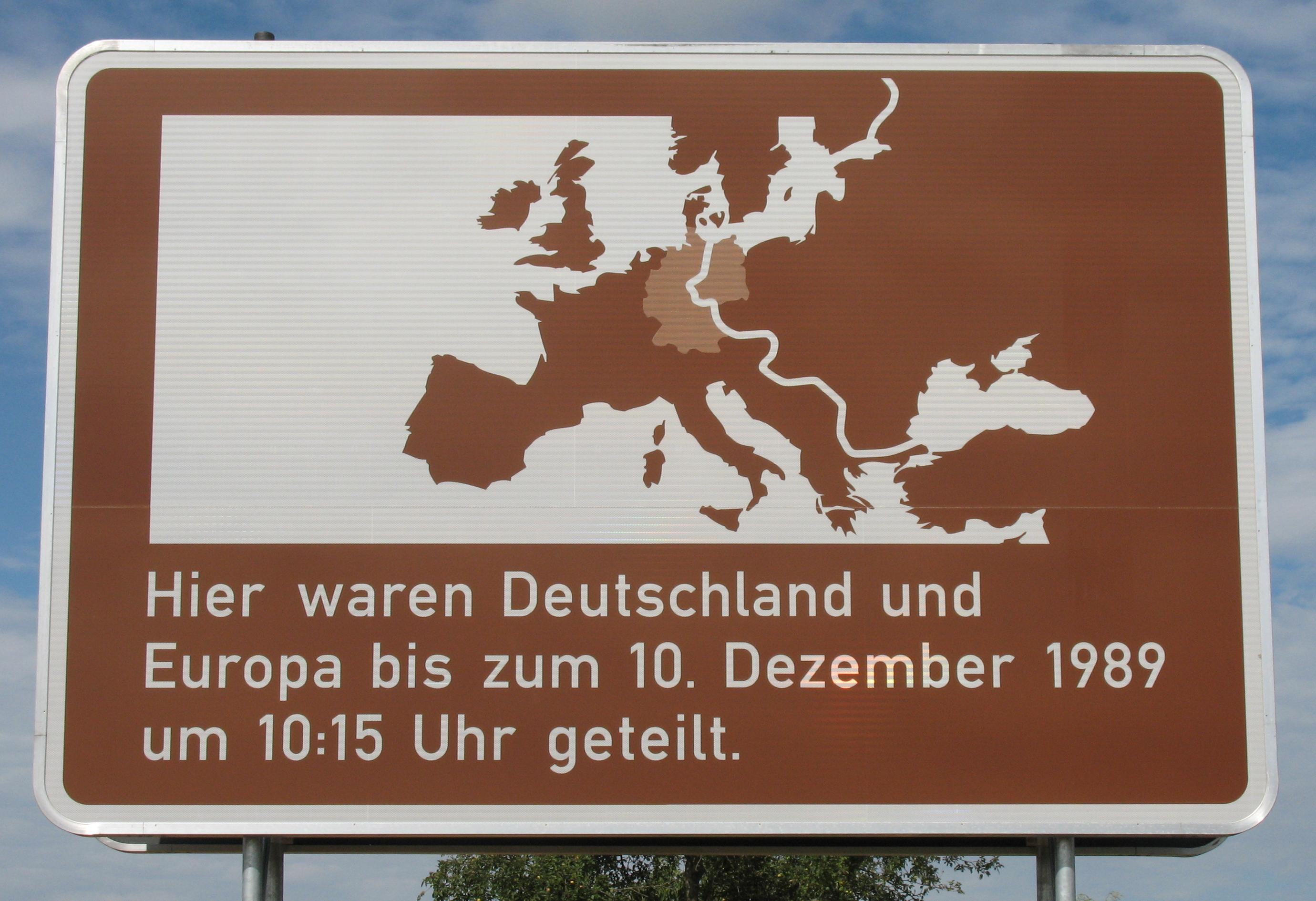
Placard found in all roads between western and eastern Germany that were blocked during division. Text translated as: "Here, Germany and Europe were divided until 10 December 1989 at 10:15 am". The date and time vary according to the actual moment when a particular crossing was opened.

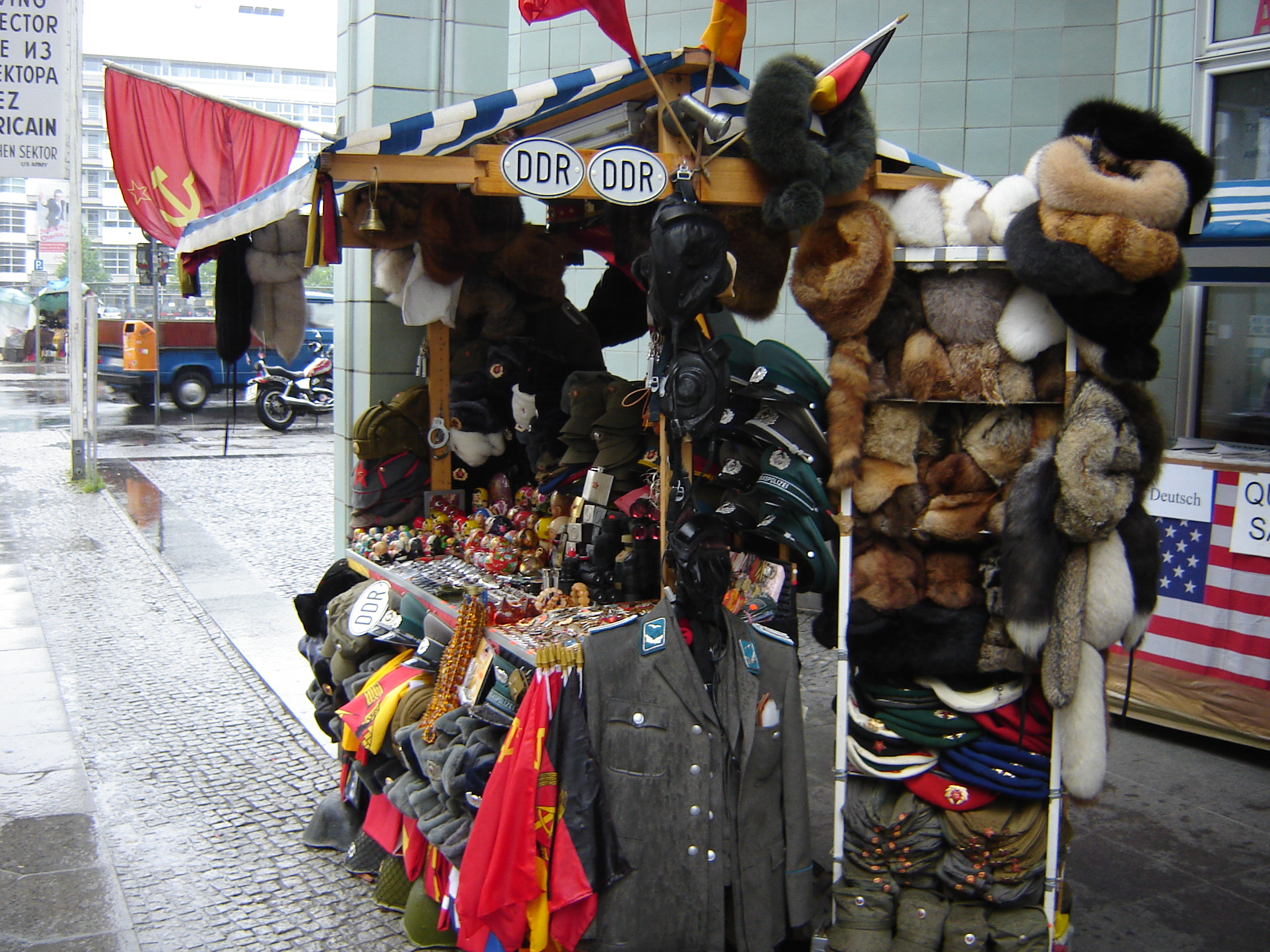
Soviet and GDR Memorabilia for sale in Berlin in 2006

Percentage of party votes for the Left Party in the 2017 federal election in Germany

Second vote share percentage for AfD, a far-right party, in the 2017 federal election in Germany, final results

=== Unified Berlin ===
While the fall of the Berlin Wall had broad economic, political, and social impacts globally, it also had significant consequence for the local urban environment. In fact, the events of 9 November 1989 saw East Berlin and West Berlin, two halves of a single city that had ignored one another for the better part of 40 years, finally "in confrontation with one another". There was a belief in the city that, after 40 years of division, the unified city would be well placed to become a major metropolis.

Another key priority was reestablishing Berlin as the seat of government of Germany, and this required buildings to serve government needs, including the "redevelopment of sites for scores of foreign embassies".

With respect to redefining the city's identity, emphasis was placed on restoring Berlin's traditional landscape. "Critical Reconstruction" policies sought to disassociate the city's identity from its Nazi and socialist legacy, though some remnants were preserved, with walkways and bicycle paths established along the border strip to preserve the memory of the Wall. In the center of East Berlin, much of the modernist heritage of the East German state was gradually removed. Unification of Berlin saw the removal of politically motivated street names and monuments in the East in an attempt to reduce the socialist legacy from the face of East Berlin.

Immediately following the fall of the Wall, Berlin experienced a boom in the construction industry. Redevelopment initiatives saw Berlin turn into one of the largest construction sites in the world through the 1990s and early 2000s.

The fall of the Wall also had economic consequences. Two German systems covering distinctly divergent degrees of economic opportunity suddenly came into intimate contact. Despite development of sites for commercial purposes, Berlin struggled to compete in economic terms with Frankfurt which remained the financial capital of the country, as well as with other key West German centers such as Munich, Hamburg, Stuttgart and Düsseldorf. The intensive building activity directed by planning policy resulted in the over-expansion of office space, "with a high level of vacancies in spite of the move of most administrations and government agencies from Bonn".

Berlin was marred by disjointed economic restructuring, associated with massive deindustrialisation. Economist Oliver Marc Hartwich asserts that, while the East undoubtedly improved economically, it was "at a much slower pace than [then Chancellor Helmut] Kohl had predicted". Wealth and income inequality between former East and West Germany continued for decades after reunification. On average, adults in the former West Germany had assets worth 94,000 euros in 2014 as compared to the adults in the former communist East Germany which had just over 40,000 euros in assets. The fall of the Berlin Wall and the factors described above led to mass migration from East Berlin and East Germany, producing a large labor supply shock in the West. Emigration from the East, totaling 870,000 people between 1989 and 1992 alone, led to worse employment outcomes for the least-educated workers, for blue-collar workers, for men, and for foreign nationals.

At the close of the century, it became evident that despite significant investment and planning, Berlin was unlikely to retake "its seat between the European Global Cities of London and Paris", primarily due to the fact that Germany's financial and commercial capital is located elsewhere (Frankfurt) than the administrative one (Berlin), in resemblance of Italy (Milan vs. Rome), Switzerland (Zürich vs. Bern), Canada (Toronto vs. Ottawa), Australia (Sydney vs. Canberra), the US (New York City vs. Washington, DC) or the Netherlands (Amsterdam vs. The Hague), as opposed to London, Paris, Madrid, Vienna, Warsaw or Moscow which combine both roles.

Ultimately, the disparity between East and West portions of Berlin has led to the city achieving a new urban identity. A number of locales of East Berlin, characterized by dwellings of in-between use of abandoned space for little to no rent, have become the focal point and foundation of Berlin's creative activities. According to Berlin Mayor Klaus Wowereit, "the best that Berlin has to offer, its unique creativity. Creativity is Berlin's future." Overall, the Berlin government's engagement in creativity is strongly centered on marketing and promotional initiatives instead of creative production.

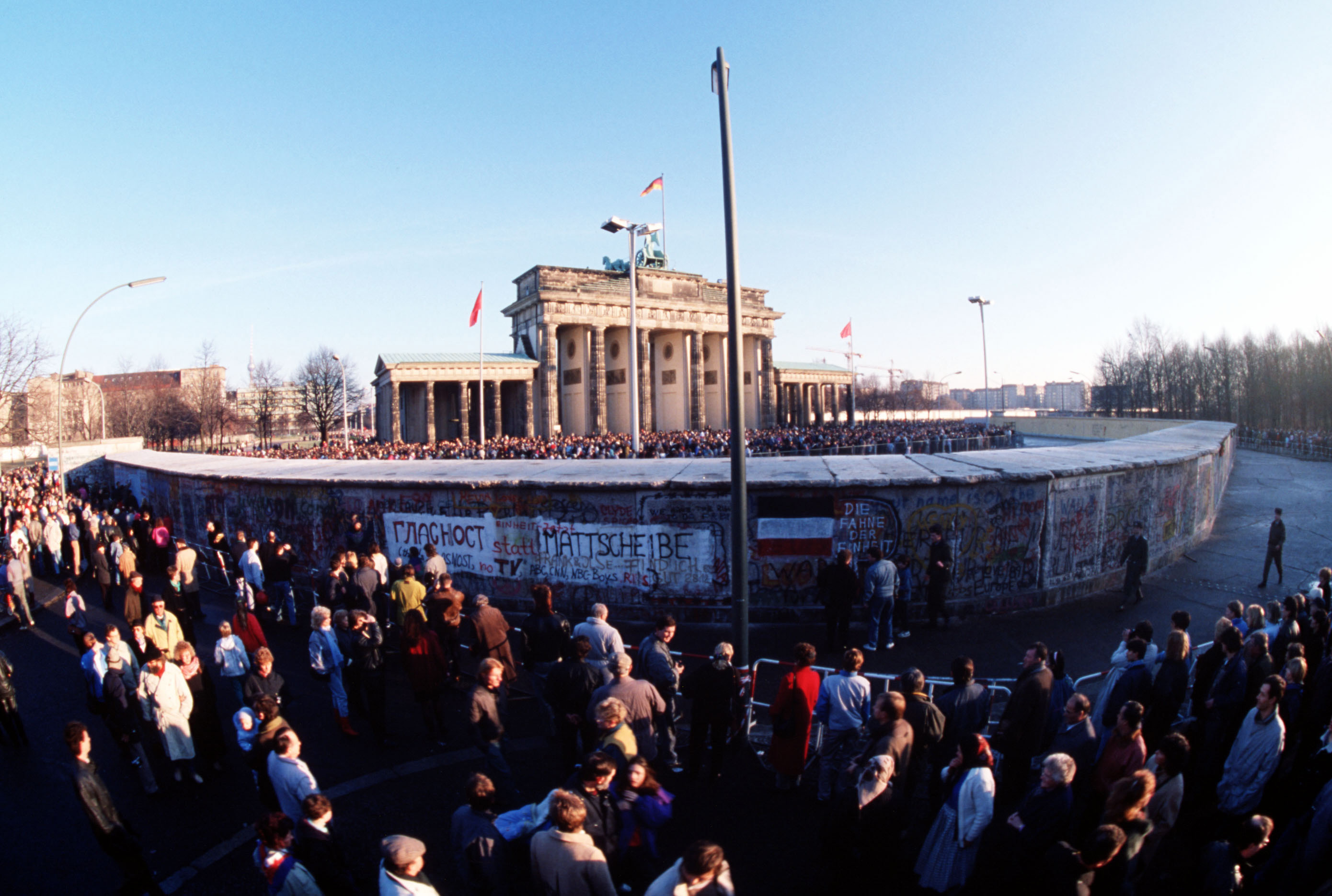
Crowds at the Brandenburg Gate on 1 December 1989. The entrance to the Western side was still not opened.

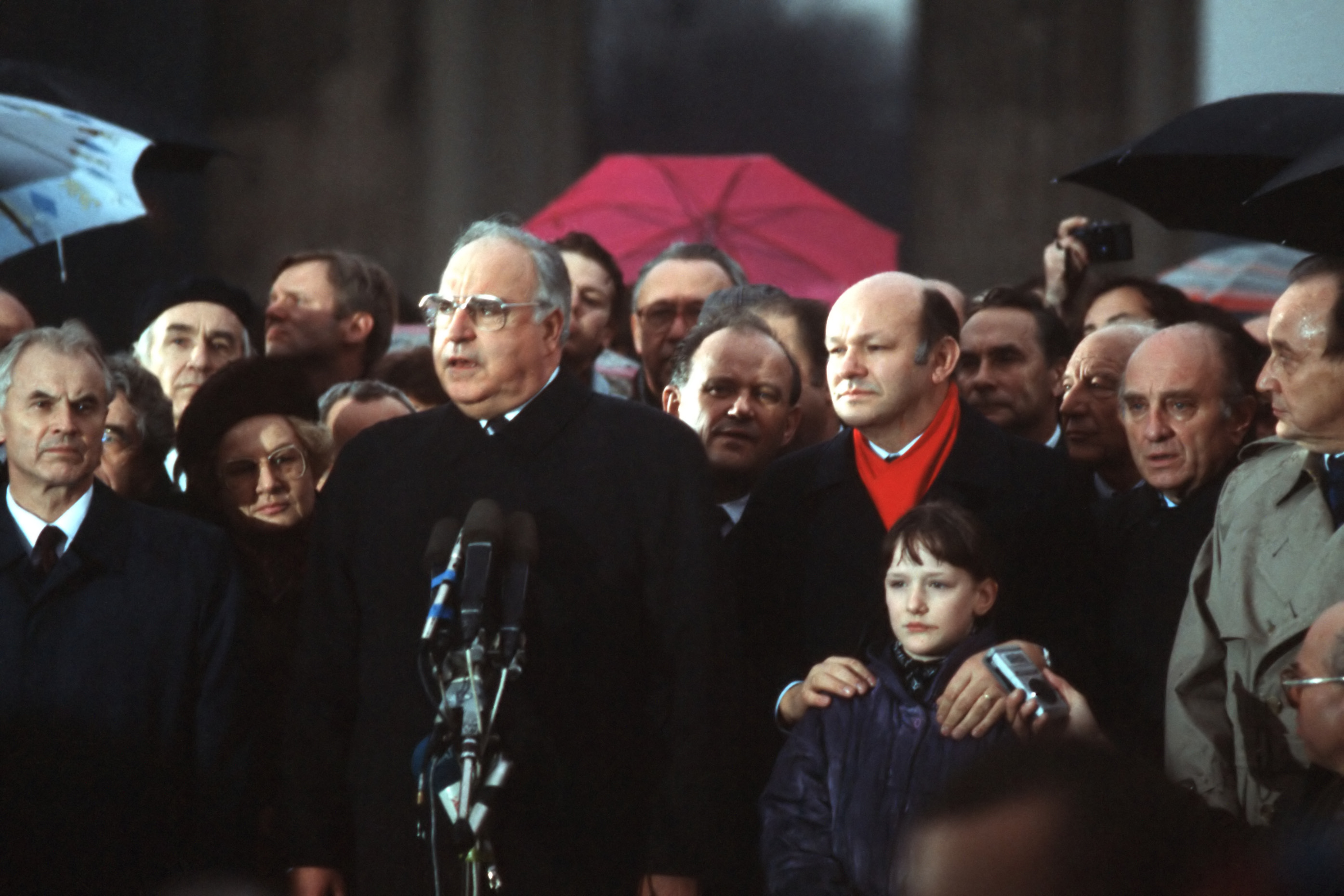
East German Prime Minister Hans Modrow, West German Chancellor Helmut Kohl, and mayor of West Berlin Walter Momper, among other figures, take part in the official opening of the Brandenburg Gate on 22 December 1989.

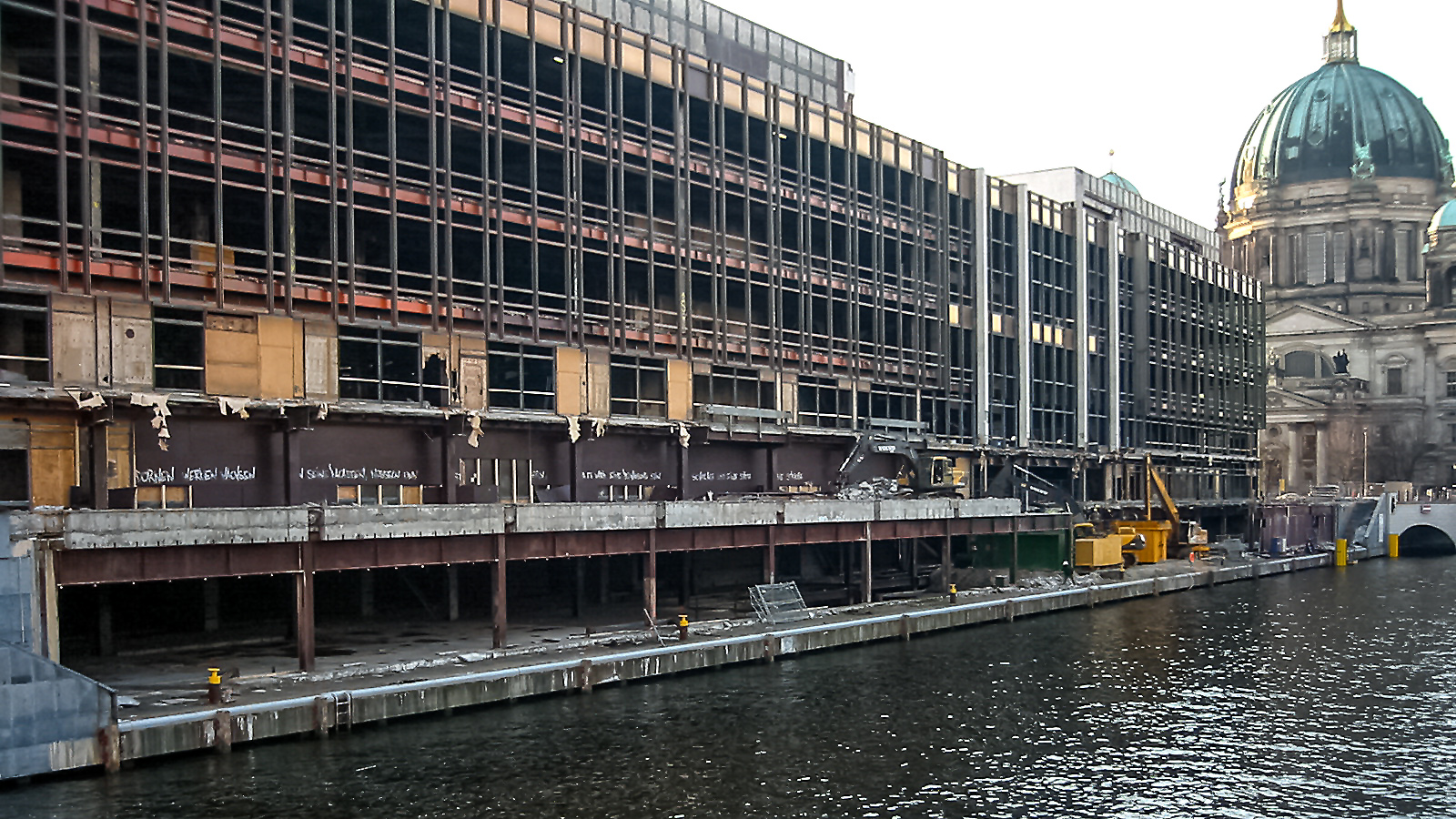
The Palace of the Republic was demolished in 2006 to make space for the reconstruction of the Berlin City Palace, which was finished in 2020, but houses the Humboldt Forum museum.

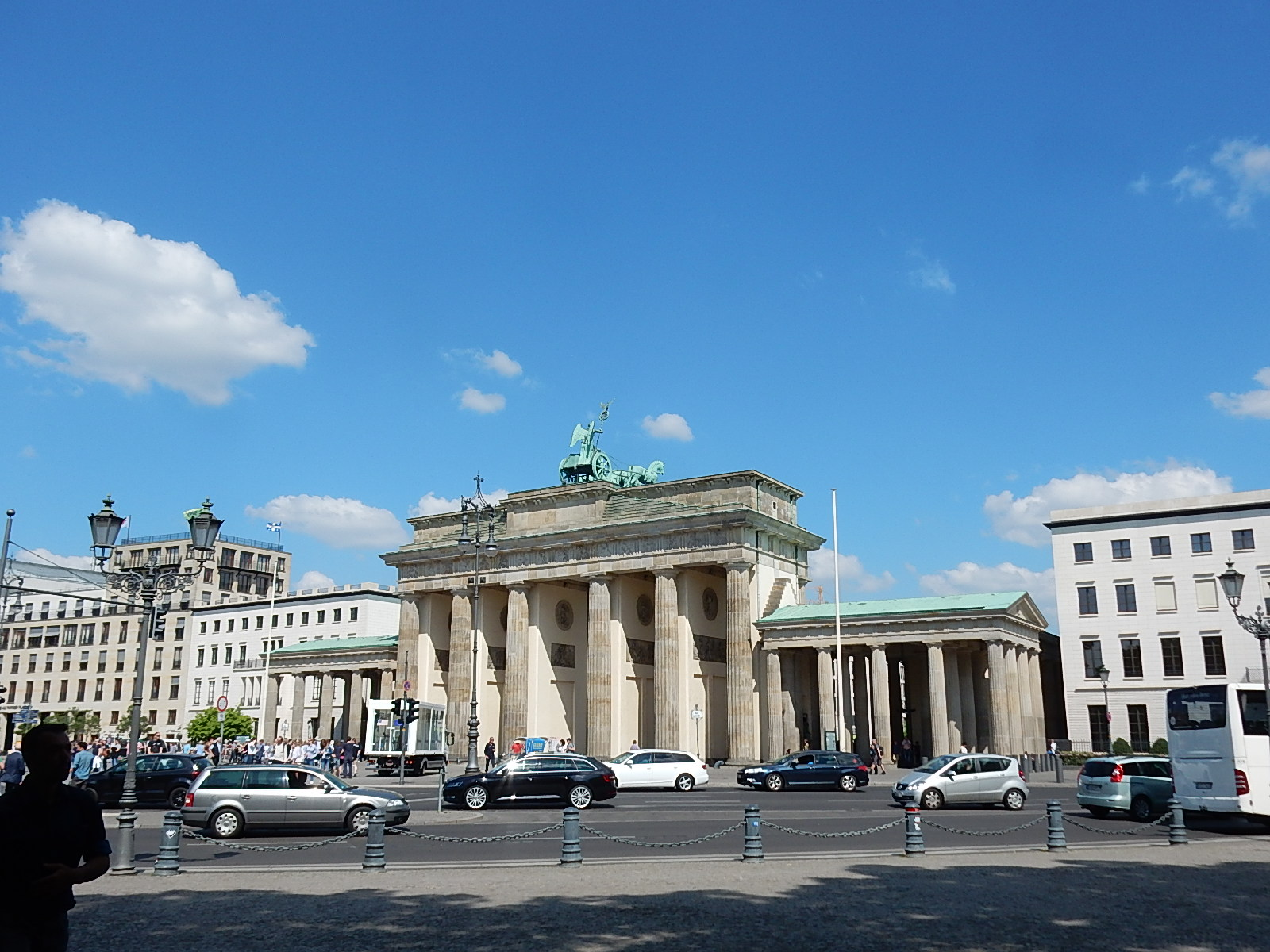
Traffic crossing the site of the former Wall near the Brandenburg Gate in 2016

== Assessment ==
=== Cost of reunification ===
The subsequent economic restructuring and reconstruction of eastern Germany resulted in significant costs, especially for western Germany, which paid large sums of money in the form of the Solidaritätszuschlag (German: [zolidaʁiˈtɛːt͡st͡suːˌʃlaːk], Solidarity Surcharge) in order to rebuild the east German infrastructure. In addition, the immensely advantageous exchange rate of 1:1 between the West German Deutschmark to the East German mark meant that East Germans could trade in their almost worthless marks for and receive wages in West German currency. This dealt a major blow to the West German budget in the coming few years. The cost of German reunification for the federal government is estimated to be between 1.5 and 2 trillion euros.

=== Views and life satisfaction ===
According to a 2019 survey conducted by Pew Research Center, 89 percent of Germans living in both the West and East believe that reunification was good for Germany, with slightly more in East than West Germany supporting it. Around 83 percent of East Germans approve of and 13 percent disapprove of eastern Germany's transition to a market economy, with the rest saying they were not sure. Life satisfaction in both the East and West has substantially increased since 1991, with 15 percent of East Germans placing their life satisfaction somewhere between 7 and 10 on a 0 to 10 scale in 1991, changing to 59 percent in 2019. For West Germans, this change over the same time period was from 52 to 64 percent. However, the 2019 annual reunification report by the German government found that 57% East Germans felt like second-class citizens, and 38% saw the reunification as a success – this figure declined to 20% amongst people under 40.

In 2023, a poll found that 40% of East Germans identify as East Germans rather than German which was 52%.

Additionally, German reunification was useful in generating wealth for those Eastern households who already had ties with the West. Those who lived in West Germany and had social ties to the East experienced a six percent average increase in their wealth in the six years following the fall of the Wall, which more than doubled that of households who did not possess the same connections. Entrepreneurs who worked in areas with strong social ties to the East saw their incomes increase as well. Incomes for this group increased at an average rate of 8.8 percent over the same six-year period following reunification. Similarly, those in the East who possessed connections to the West saw their household income increase at a positive rate in each of the six years following reunification. Those in their regions who lacked the same ties did not see this benefit.

The fall of the Berlin Wall proved disastrous for the East German labour unions, whose bargaining power was undermined by labour reforms and companies offshoring production to low-wage East European neighbouring countries. Membership of trade unions and associations sharply declined in the mid-1990s, and collective wage and salary agreements became increasingly uncommon. As the result, average nominal compensation per employee in East Germany "fell to very low levels" after the unification. Labour reforms implemented after the unification focused on reducing costs for companies and dismantled East German wage and social security regulations in favour of incentivizing employers to create jobs. The low-wage sector in Germany expanded, and the share of employees in low-paid employment amounted to 20% of the workforce by 2009.

== Comparison ==
Germany was not the only country that had been divided into two states (1949–1990) due to the Cold War. Korea (1945–present), China (1949–present), Yemen (1967–1990), and Vietnam (1954–1976) were or remain separated through the establishment of "Western-(free) Capitalist" and "Eastern-Communist" zones or former occupations.

Korea and Vietnam suffered severely from this division in the Korean War (1950–1953) and Vietnam War (1955–1975) respectively, which caused heavy economic and civilian damage. However, German separation did not result in another war.

Moreover, Germany is the only one of these countries that has managed to achieve a peaceful reunification without subsequent violent conflict. For instance, Vietnam achieved reunification after the war under the communist government of North Vietnam in 1976, and Yemen achieved peaceful reunification in 1990 but then suffered a civil war which delayed the reunification process. North and South Korea as well as Mainland China and Taiwan still struggle with high political tensions and huge economic and social disparities, making a possible reunification an enormous challenge.

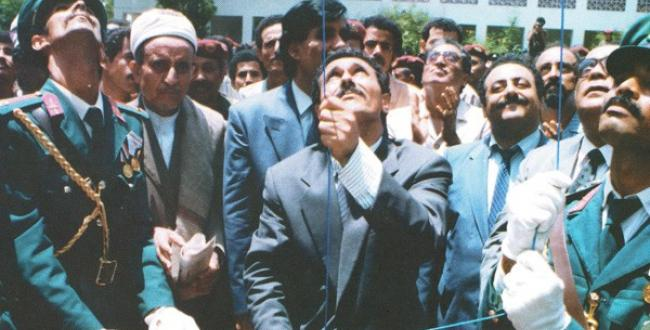
The unification of North Yemen and South Yemen to form present-day Yemen on 22 May 1990

Korean Unification Flag (1991–present)

== See also ==
- Chinese unification
- Dissolution of the Soviet Union
- Inner German relations
- Inner German border
- Irish reunification
- Korean reunification
- Transitology
- Vietnamese reunification
- Yemeni unification
