= Flatland (disambiguation) =

Flatland is an 1884 novella by Edwin Abbott.

Flatland or Flatlands may also refer to:

== Places ==
- Flatlands, New Brunswick, Canada; a community in Addington Parish, Restigouche County
- Flatlands, Brooklyn, New York City, USA; a neighborhood Kings County
  - Flatlands Avenue, Brooklyn
- Flatland, Kansas, USA; a ghost town in Greenwood County

== People ==
- Ann Kristin Aafedt Flatland (born 1982), Norwegian biathlete
- Hallvard Flatland (born 1957), Norwegian TV personality
- Helga Flatland (born 1984), Norwegian novelist

== Arts, entertainment, and media ==
- Flatland, an online magazine published by KCPT
- Flatland (TV series) (2019-2020)

=== Film ===
- Flatland (2007 Ehlinger film), also called "Flatland: The Film", a 2007 animated full-length film based on the novella, separate from the short film
- Flatland (2007 Johnson and Travis film), also called "Flatland: The Movie", a 2007 animated short film based on the novella, separate from the full-length film
- Flatland (2019 film), a 2019 South African film

== Sports ==
- Flatland BMX, a riding style in BMX freestyle focusing on stunts performed exclusively on the ground
- Flatland skimboarding, a watersport commonly done in creeks, lakes, or rivers
- Freestyle skating, also known as flatland in-line skating

== Other uses ==
- "Flatland", a nickname for Earth in Larry Niven's Known Space fictional milieu
- A flatland, a land of relatively constant altitude, also known as a plain.

== See also ==
- Flatlander (disambiguation)
- Flat (disambiguation), for lands named Flat
