= Lander =

Lander may refer to:

== Media and entertainment ==
- Lander (video game), a computer game published by Psygnosis in 1999
- Lander (game demo), the 3D game demo provided with the Acorn Archimedes computer
- Lander (Transformers), a fictional character in the Transformers series
- Lunar Lander (arcade game), an arcade game
- Lunar Lander (video game series), one of several video games

== Places ==
United States

- Lander College for Men, a Jewish college in New York
- Lander County, Nevada, United States
- Lander, Maryland, United States
- Lander, Pennsylvania, United States
- Lander University, a public university in South Carolina
- Lander, Wyoming, United States

Venezuela

- Lander Municipality

== Science ==
- Benthic lander, oceanographic measuring platform which sits on the seabed or benthic zone
- Lander (crater), lunar crater
- Lander (spacecraft), type of spacecraft, designed for descending the surface of an astronomical body

== Other uses ==
- Lander Otaola (born 1989), Spanish actor
- Lander (surname)
- Lander (foreigner), a foreigner

== See also ==
- Länder
- Landers (disambiguation)
- Flatlander (disambiguation)
- Outlander (disambiguation)
