= Flatlander =

Flatlander may refer to:

- "Flatlander" (short story), a 1967 story by Larry Niven
- Flatlander (short story collection), a 1975 collection of short stories by Larry Niven
- Flatlander (Niven), a term used in Larry Niven's works
- A character in the 1884 Edwin Abbott novella Flatland
- The Flatlanders, a country music band
- Andy Morin, audio engineer for the hip hop group Death Grips, often referred to as "Flatlander".
- Flatlander, a term for newcomers to the U.S. states of Maine, New Hampshire, or Vermont
- Flatlander, anyone originating from Umina, Central Coast of NSW, Australia.

== See also ==
- Flatland (disambiguation)
- Flat (disambiguation)
- Lander (disambiguation)
