= Länder =

Länder (singular Land) or Bundesländer (singular Bundesland) is the name for (federal) states in two German-speaking countries. It may more specifically refer to:

- States of Austria, the nine federal subdivisions of Austria
- States of Germany, the 16 federal subdivisions of Germany

== See also ==
- Land (disambiguation)
