= Jacek =

Jacek, Jacinto, Giacinto, Jacint
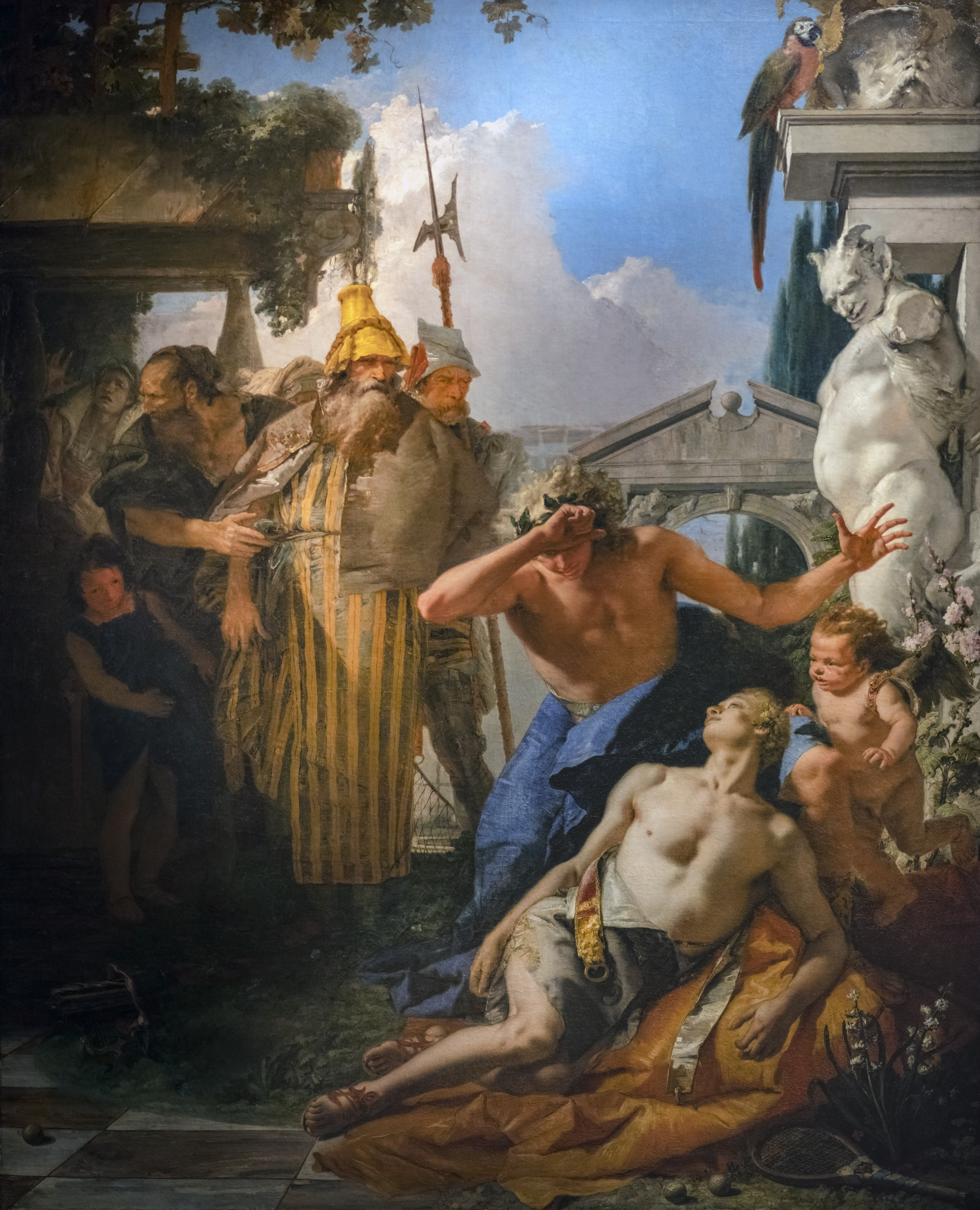
- The Death of Hyacinth by Giovanni Battista Tiepolo
- Pronunciation: Polish: [ˈjat͡sɛk]
- Gender: Male

Origin
- Origin: Hyacinth
- Region of origin: Polish, Spanish, Portuguese, Italian, Catalan, Hungarian, Czech, Slovak, Greek

Other names
- Related names: Jacinto (Spanish and Portuguese), Jacint/Cint/Cinto (Catalan), Giacinto (Italian), Jácint (Hungarian), Hyacinth (Greek)

Jacek (Polish: [ˈjat͡sɛk]) is a Polish given name of Greek origin related to Hyacinth, through the archaic form of Jacenty. Its closely related equivalents are: Jacinto (Spanish and Portuguese), Giacinto (Italian), Jácint (Hungarian) and Jacint (Catalan, shortened to Cint or Cinto following the Catalan tradition of hypocorising through apheresis).

Notable people with the name include:

== B ==
- Jacek Baluch (1940–2019), Polish scholar, writer and poet
- Jacek Banasiak (born 1959), Polish mathematician
- Jacek Bayer (born 1964), Polish football player and coach
- Jacek Bazański (born 1958), Polish diplomat
- Jacek Bednarek (born 1964), Polish racewalker
- Jacek Bednarski (1939–2008), Polish chess player and politician
- Jacek Bednarz (born 1967), Polish football executive and former player
- Jacek Berensztajn (born 1973), Polish footballer
- Jacek Beutler (born 1964), Polish judoka
- Jacek Bielczyk (born 1953), Polish chess player
- Jacek Bielski (born 1972), Polish boxer
- Jacek Bierkowski (born 1948), Polish fencer
- Jacek Bobrowicz (born 1962), Polish footballer
- Jacek Bocheński (born 1926), Polish author
- Jacek Bodyk (born 1966), Polish cyclist
- Jacek Bogucki (born 1959), Polish politician
- Jacek Borcuch (born 1970), Polish actor and film director
- Jacek Braciak (born 1968), Polish actor
- Jacek Bromski (born 1946), Polish film director
- Jacek Brzozowski (born 1977), Polish politician
- Jacek Bury (born 1967), Polish politician
- Jacek Bylica (born 1963), Polish diplomat
- Jacek Bąk (born 1973), Polish footballer
- Jacek Błażewicz (born 1951), Polish computer scientist

== C ==
- Jacek Chańko (born 1974), Polish footballer
- Jacek Chmielnik (1953–2007), Polish actor
- Jacek Chociej (born 1965), Polish footballer
- Jacek Cichocki (born 1971), Polish politician
- Jacek Cuch (born 1973), Polish footballer
- Jacek Cyzio (born 1968), Polish football player and coach
- Jacek Czaputowicz (born 1956), Polish politician and academic
- Jacek Czech (born 1976), Polish Paralympic swimmer
- Jacek Czerniak (born 1964), Polish politician and political scientist

== D ==
- Jacek Dąbrowski (born 1974), Polish footballer
- Jacek Daniluk (1961–1986), Polish equestrian
- Jacek Dehnel (born 1980), Polish poet and writer
- Jacek Dembiński (born 1969), Polish footballer
- Jacek Dominik (born 1969), Polish civil servant
- Jacek Duchowski (born 1966), Polish footballer
- Jacek Dukaj (born 1974), Polish science fiction writer

== F ==
- Jacek Falfus (born 1951), Polish politician
- Jacek Fedorowicz (born 1937), Polish satirist and caricaturist
- Jacek Frąckiewicz (born 1969), Polish footballer
- Jacek Furdyna (born 1933), Polish-American physicist

== G ==
- Jacek Gabrusewicz (born 1982), Polishh footballer
- Jacek Gawryszewski (born 1966), Polish diplomat
- Jacek Gałązka (1924–2018), Polish soldier
- Jacek Gdański (born 1970), Polish chess player
- Jacek Gilewski (born 1969), Polish archer
- Jacek Gmoch (born 1939), Polish footballer and manager
- Jacek Gollob (born 1969), Polish motorcycle speedway rider
- Jacek "Tede" Graniecki (born 1976), Polish rapper
- Jacek Grembocki (born 1965), Polish football player and coach
- Jacek Gutowski (1960–1996), Polish weightlifter
- Jacek Góralski (born 1992), Polish footballer

== H ==
- Jacek Hankiewicz (born 1965), Polish badminton player
- Jacek Huchwajda (born 1967), German fencer
- Jacek Hugo-Bader (born 1957), Polish journalist

== I ==
- Jacek Inglot (born 1962), Polish science-fiction writer
- Jacek Izydorczyk (born 1972), Polish law professor

== J ==
- Jacek Jankowski (born 1969), Polish diplomat
- Jacek Jasiaczek (born 1964), Polish ice dancer
- Jacek Jaworek (1969–2024), Polish construction worker
- Jacek Jaśkowiak (born 1964), Polish politician and entrepreneur
- Jacek Jezierski (1722–1805), Polish writer and businessman
- Jacek Jędruch (1927–1995), Polish-American nuclear engineer and historian

== K ==
- Jacek Kacprzak (born 1970), Polish footballer
- Jacek Kaczmarski (1957–2004), Polish singer and songwriter
- Jacek Kalita, Polish professional bridge player
- Jacek Karpiński (1927–2010), Polish computer scientist and engineer
- Jacek Kaspszyk (born 1952), Polish music conductor
- Jacek Kawalec (born 1961), Polish actor and television personality
- Jacek Kazimierski (born 1959), Polish footballer
- Jacek Kiełb (born 1988), Polish footballer
- Jacek Junosza Kisielewski (born 1952), Polish biologist and diplomat
- Jacek Kochan (born 1955), Polish drummer and music producer
- Jacek Koman (born 1956), Polish actor and singer
- Jacek Komuda (born 1972), Polish writer and historian
- Jacek Kopczyński (born 1971), Polish actor
- Jacek Kosmalski (born 1976), Polish footballer
- Jacek Kowalczyk (born 1981), Polishfootballer
- Jacek Kościelniak (born 1963), Polish politician
- Jacek Krawczyk (born 1949), Polish swimmer
- Jacek Krenz (born 1948), Polish academic architect and painter
- Jacek Krukowski (born 1969), Polish equestrian
- Jacek Krupa (born 1955), Polish politician
- Jacek Krupka (born 1977), Polish entrepreneur and darts player
- Jacek Krywult (1941–2023), Polish politician
- Jacek Krzynówek (born 1976), Polish footballer
- Jacek Kubka (born 1967), Polish sports shooter
- Jacek Kugler (born 1942), American political scientist
- Jacek Kuranty (born 1978), Polish football player and coach
- Jacek Kuroń (1934–2004), Polish opposition leader
- Jacek Kurski (born 1966), Polish politician
- Jacek Kurzawiński (1962–2019), Polish volleyball coach

== L ==
- Jacek Lachowicz (born 1972), Polish musician
- Jacek Laskowski (born 1967), Polishsports commentator
- Jacek Lech (1947–2007), Polish singer
- Jacek Lipiński (born 1966), Polish lawyer and politician
- Jacek Lojtek, Polish Paralympic volleyball player

== M ==
- Jacek Magdziński (born 1986), Polish footballer
- Jacek Magiera (1977–2026), Polish football player and coach
- Jacek Majchrowski (born 1947), Polish politician and professor
- Jacek Malczewski (1854–1929), Polish painter
- Jacek Markiewicz (born 1976), Polish football player and coach
- Jacek Małachowski (1737–1821), Polish nobleman
- Jacek Mickiewicz (born 1970), Polish cyclist
- Jacek Mierzejewski (1883–1925), Polish painter
- Jacek Moskwa (born 1948), Polish journalist

== N ==
- Jacek Najder (born 1960), Polish diplomat and politician
- Jacek Namieśnik (1949–2019), Polish chemist
- Jacek Nawrocki (born 1965), Polish volleyball player and coach
- Jacek Niedźwiedzki (1951–2021), Polish tennis player
- Jacek Nieżychowski (1924–2009), Polish actor and singer

== O ==
- Jacek Olczak (born 1965), Polish businessman
- Jacek Oleksyn (born 1953), Polish biologist
- Jacek Ozdoba (born 1991), Polish politician

== P ==
- Jacek Paczkowski (born 1981), Polish footballer
- Jacek Pastusiński (born 1964), Polish triple jumper
- Jacek Paszulewicz (born 1977), Polish professional football player and coach
- Jacek Pałkiewicz (born 1942), Polish journalist, traveler and explorer
- Jacek Piechota (born 1959), Polish politician
- Jacek Piekara (born 1965), Polish fantasy writer
- Jacek Płuciennik (1970–1998), Polish footballer
- Jacek Podsiadło (born 1964), Polish poet and writer
- Jacek Poniedziałek (born 1965), Polish actor
- Jacek Popek (born 1978), Polish footballer
- Jacek Popiel (born 1954), Polish theatre and literary scholar and professor
- Jacek Proszyk (born 1973), Polish historian
- Jacek Protasiewicz (born 1967), Polish politician
- Jacek Protas (born 1964), Polish politician
- Jacek Proć (born 1981), Polish archer
- Jacek Przebierała, Polish Paralympic athlete
- Jacek Prześluga, Polish businessman
- Jacek Pszczoła (born 1967), American bridge player
- Jacek Purchla (born 1954), Polish art historian and economist
- Jacek Pyl (born 1962), Polish–Ukrainian Roman Catholic prelate

== R ==
- Jacek Rajchel (1944–2020), Polish geologist and author
- Jacek Ratajczak (born 1973), Polish footballer
- Jacek Rempała (born 1971), Polish motorcycle speedway rider
- Jacek Andrzej Rossakiewicz (1956–2016), Polish painter
- Jacek Rostowski (born 1951), Polish-British politician and economist
- Jacek Rotmil (1888–1944), Polish art director
- Jacek Rozenek (born 1969), Polish actor
- Jacek Rutkowski (1934–2016), Polish geologist and professor
- Jacek Rybicki (1959–2024), Polish trade unionist and politician
- Jacek Rybiński (1701–1782), Polish Cistercian
- Jacek Rylski (born 1956), Polish rower
- Jacek Różycki (c.1635 – 1703/1704), Polish composer

== S ==
- Jacek Salij (born 1942), Polish theologian
- Jacek Saryusz-Wolski (born 1948), Polish politician and diplomat
- Jacek Sasin (born 1969), Polish politician
- Jacek Sauk (born 1944), Polish politician
- Jacek Sempoliński (1927–2012), Polish painter and art professor
- Jacek Siewiera (born 1984), Polish army officer, medical doctor, and lawyer
- Jacek Soliński (born 1957), Polish painter and photographer
- Jacek Starościak (1947–2021), Polish politician
- Jacek Stopa (born 1987), polish chess player
- Jacek Streich (born 1967), Polish rower
- Jacek Stryjenski (1922–1961), Swiss painter and decorator
- Jacek Sutryk (born 1978), Polish politician and sociologist
- Jacek Szczurowski (1716 – after 1773), Polish Jesuit and musician
- Jacek Szmatka (1950–2001), Polish sociologist
- Jacek Szopiński (born 1964), Polish ice hockey player and coach

== T ==
- Jacek Tascher (born 1957), Polishfigure skater
- Jacek Tomczak (born 1962), Polish-Canadian artist sculptor
- Jacek Tomczak (born 1973), Polish politician and lawyer
- Jacek Tomczak (chess player) (born 1990), Polish chess player
- Jacek Tylicki (born 1951), Polish artist

== W ==
- Jacek Wierzchowiecki (1944–2015), Polish equestrian
- Jacek Wilk (born 1974), Polish lawyer and politician
- Jacek Wiśniewski (born 1974), Polish footballer
- Jacek Wojciechowicz (born 1963), Polish politician
- Jacek Woroniecki (1878–1949), Polish priest and theologian
- Jacek Woszczerowicz (1904–1970), Polish actor
- Jacek Wszoła (born 1956), Polish high jumper
- Jacek Włosowicz (born 1966), Polish politician

== Y ==
- Jacek Yerka (born 1952), Polish surrealist painter

== Z ==
- Jacek Żalek (born 1973), Polish politician
- Jacek Ziarkowski (born 1975), Polish football player and coach
- Jacek Zieliński (disambiguation)
- Jacek Ziober (1965–2026), Polish footballer
- Jacek Łągwa (born 1969), Polish musician and actor
- Jacek Żakowski (born 1957), Polish journalist and author
- Jacek Żuławski (1907–1976), Polish sculptor
- Jacek M. Zurada, Polish-American computer scientist

== See also ==
- Saint Hyacinth (Święty Jacek, Jacek Odrowąż, c. 1185–1257), Dominican friar and saint
- Radosław Jacek (born 1986), Polish football player and coach
