= Natalia Bamber-Laskowska =

Polish volleyball player (born 1982)

Natalia Bamber
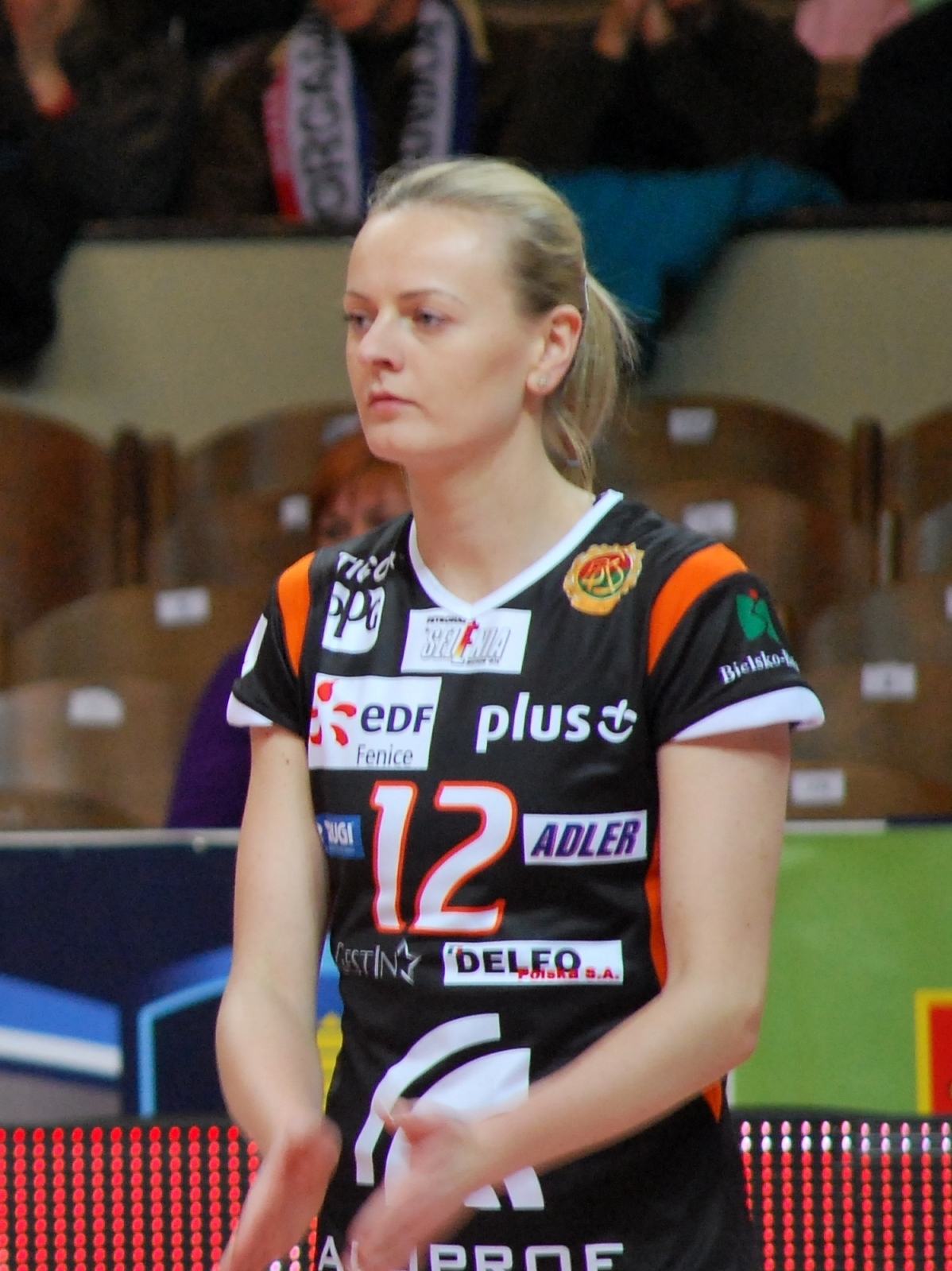

Personal information
- Full name: Natalia Bamber
- Nationality: Polish
- Born: 24 February 1982 (age 44); Sulechów, Poland
- Height: 1.86 m (6 ft 1 in)
- Weight: 69 kg (152 lb)
- Spike: 311 cm (122 in)
- Block: 288 cm (113 in)

Volleyball information
- Position: Middle blocker/Opposite
- Current club: (Poland) BKS Stal Bielsko-Biała
- Number: 9

Career
Years	Teams
2005–2007; 2007–2012; 2014–	(Poland) Zawisza Sulechów (Poland) SMS PZPS Sosnowiec (Poland) Gwardia Wrocław (Poland) Muszynianka Muszyna (Poland) BKS Stal Bielsko-Biała (Poland) BKS Stal Bielsko-Biała

National team
2002–2009	Poland
Honours
Representing Poland
Women's volleyball
European Championship
Gold medal – first place	2005 Croatia
Bronze medal – third place	2009 Poland
- Last updated: 11 June 2015

Natalia Bamber (born 24 February 1982) is a Polish volleyball player, a member of Poland women's national volleyball team and Polish club BKS Stal Bielsko-Biała, European Champion 2005), bronze medalist of the European Championship 2009, Polish Champion (2006, 2010).

== Personal life ==
On 19 June 2011 she married Jacek Laskowski, a sports commentator. In 2014, she gave birth to their first child.

== Career ==
=== National team ===
In 2005 Bamber achieved title of European Champion, but she did not play because of injury. In October 2009 she won with teammates bronze medal of European Championship 2009 after winning match against Germany.

== Sporting achievements ==
=== National team ===
- 2005 CEV European Championship
- 2009 CEV European Championship

=== State awards ===
- 2005 Silver Cross of Merit
