= Jan Kaja =

Polish painter

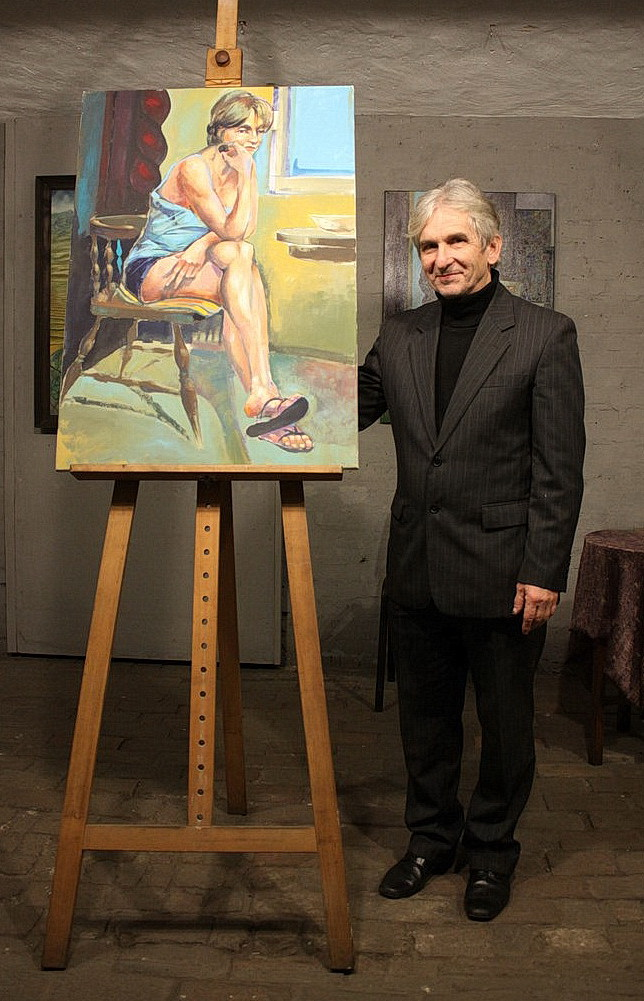
- Jan Kaja in 2016
- Born: 1957 (age 68–69); Bydgoszcz, Poland
- Known for: painting

Jan Kaja (born 1957) is a Polish painter, photographer and publisher.

== Biography ==
Kaja was born in Bydgoszcz, Poland. Since 1979, together with Jacek Soliński, he has run an art gallery Authors' Gallery (org. Galeria Autorska) in Bydgoszcz.

In 2015 he received from Ministry of Culture and National Heritage (Poland) special medal for his contribution in polish culture.

== Information ==
In 1980s carried out conceptual projects (posters – appeals). Together with Jacek Soliński elaborated and issued a number of monographic art books dedicated to fine artists.

Presented several dozen of solo exhibitions in Poland: Bydgoszcz, Gdańsk, Sopot, Toruń, Warsaw, Łódź, Kraków, Lublin; and abroad in: Paris, Rome, Tokyo and Edinburgh.

== Paintings ==
His paintings are based on a relation between a face and hands and they constitute peculiar one-person theatre. The painter treats his work as a return to the state of spontaneity thanks to which is able to discover a human in their entire simplicity of expression and at the same time with their spiritual profundity. Made cycles of paintings: "Characters unreal", "Gates", "Way of the Cross", "Conversations".

=== Paintings (selection) ===
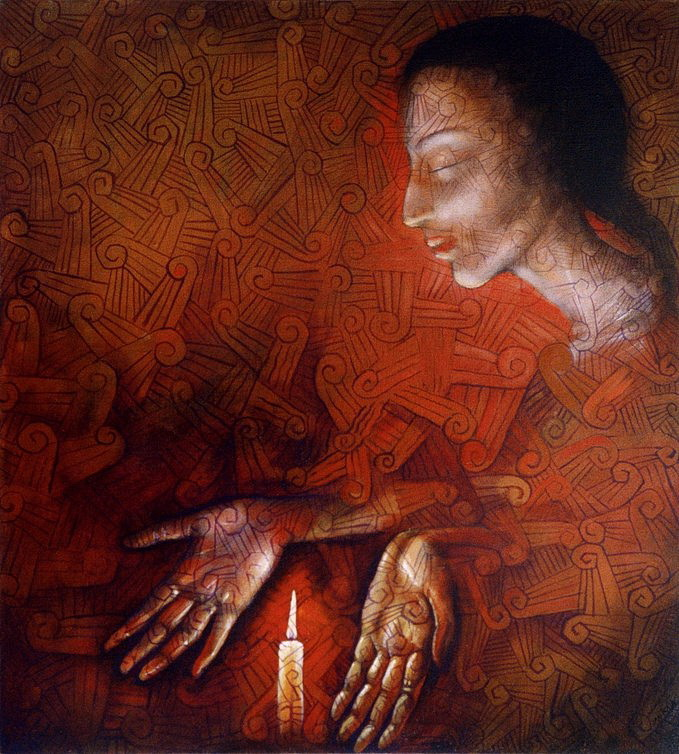
"Cicha Noc" acrylic, canvas 73x81 (1993)

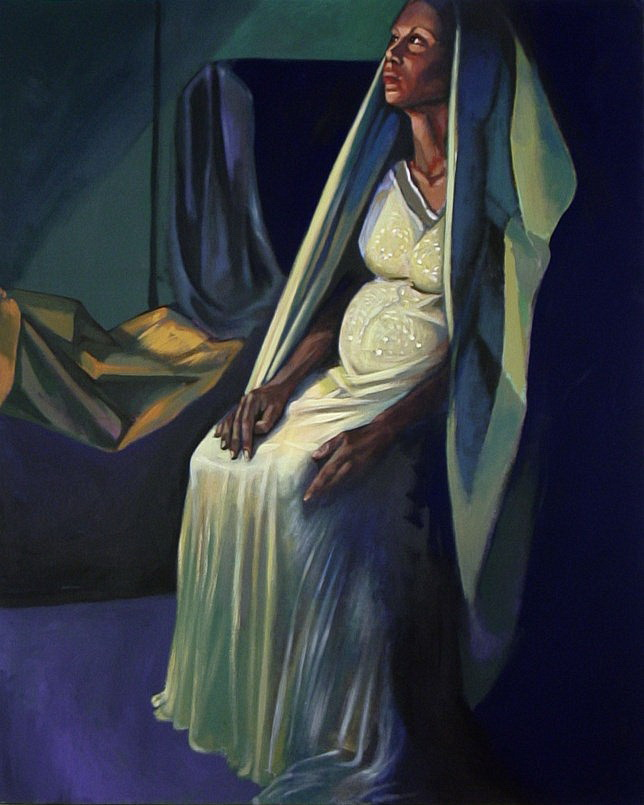
"Oczekiwanie" acrylic, canvas 80x100 (2008)

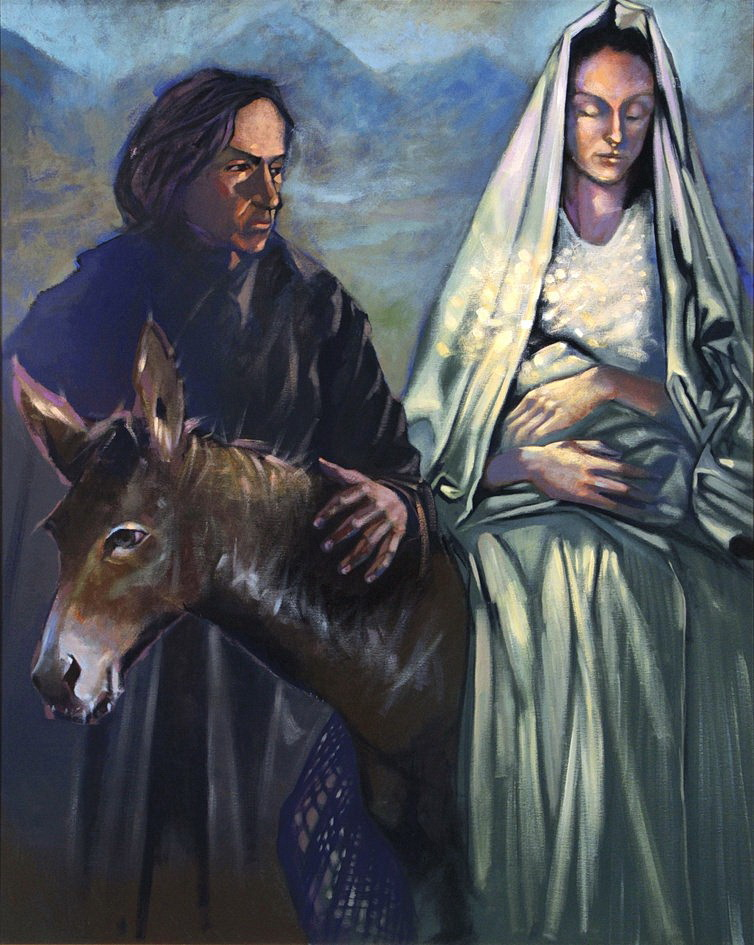
"W drodze" acrylic, canvas 80x100 (2008)

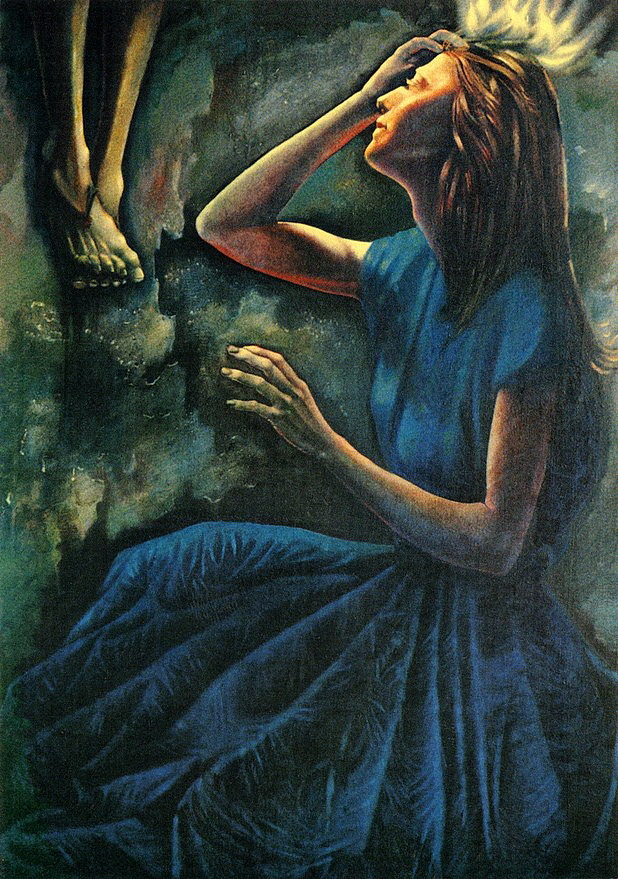
"Magdalena" oil, canvas 101x125 (1991)

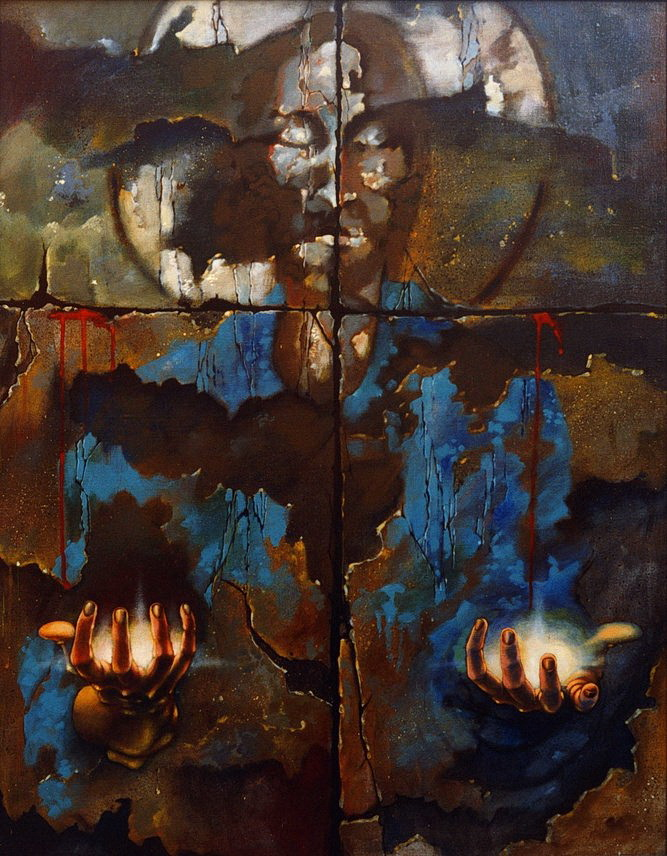
"Przeistoczenie" acrylic, canvas 73x100 (1991)

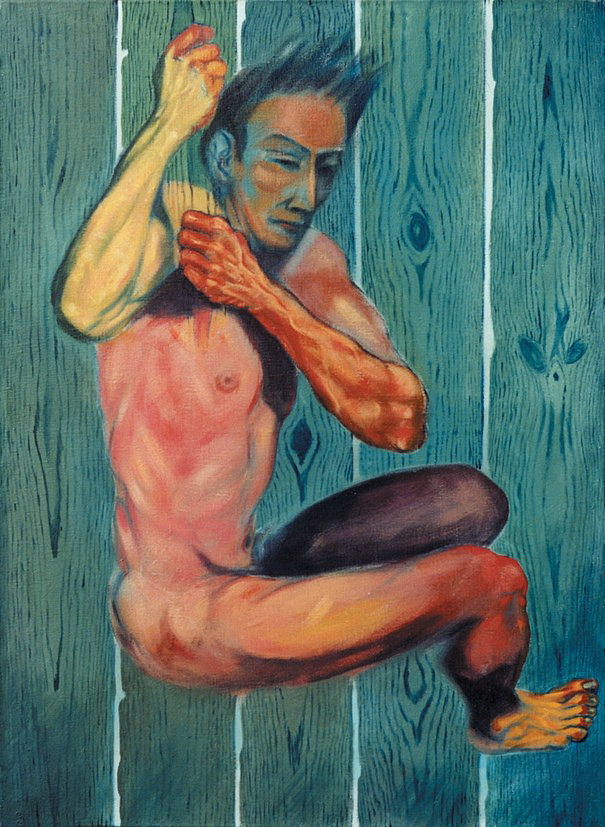
"Dzwonnik" acrylic, canvas 73x100 (2000)

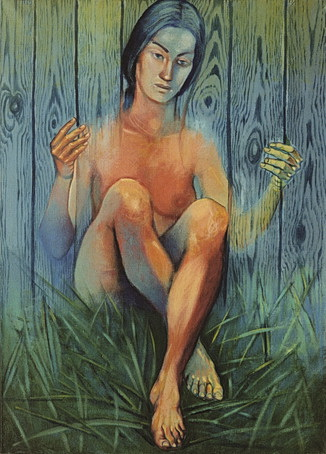
"Chwile później" acrylic, canvas 73x100 (2001)

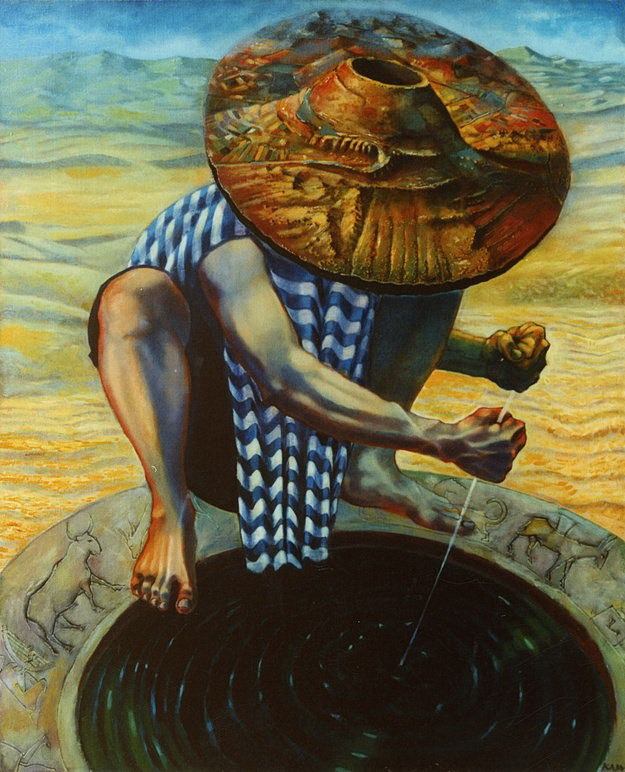
"W głębi" acrylic, canvas 80x100 (1998)

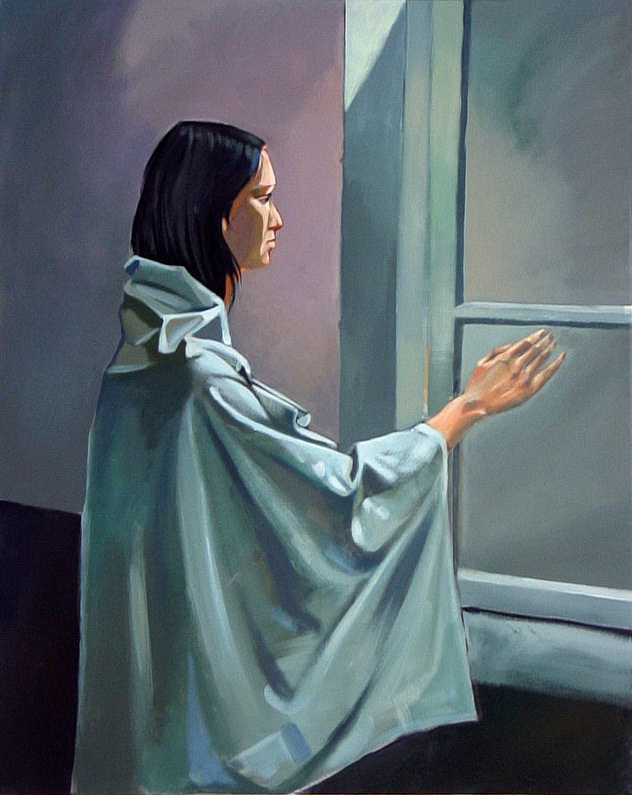
"Tak" acrylic, canvas 80x100 (2008)

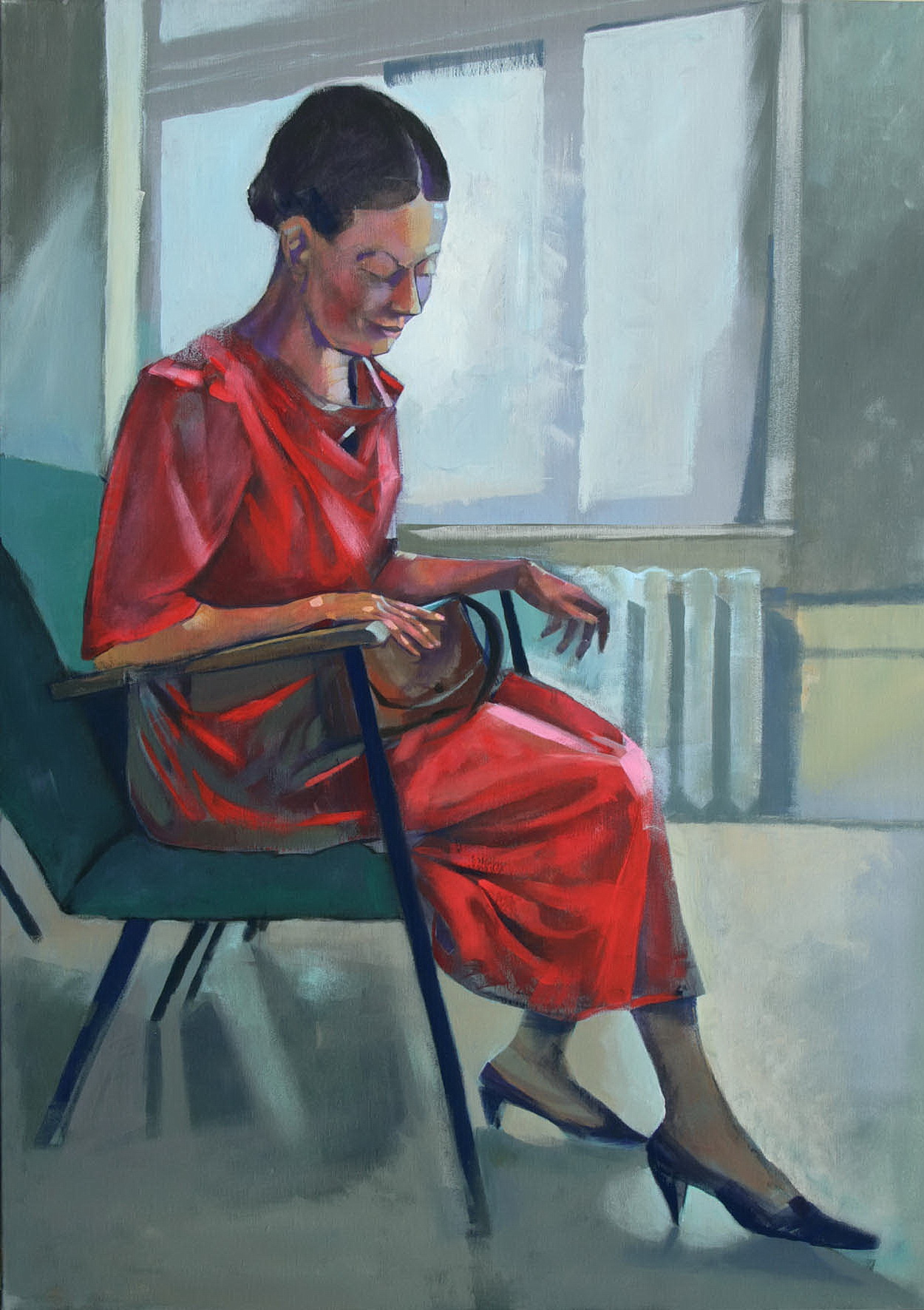
"Poczekalnia" acrylic, canvas 73x100 (2011)

== Bibliography ==
- "Chwile obecności (1979-2004)" Publisher: Galeria Autorska, Bydgoszcz, 2004, ISBN 83-91-4388-5-6

== See also ==
- List of Polish painters
