= Jacek Namieśnik =

Polish chemist (1949–2019)

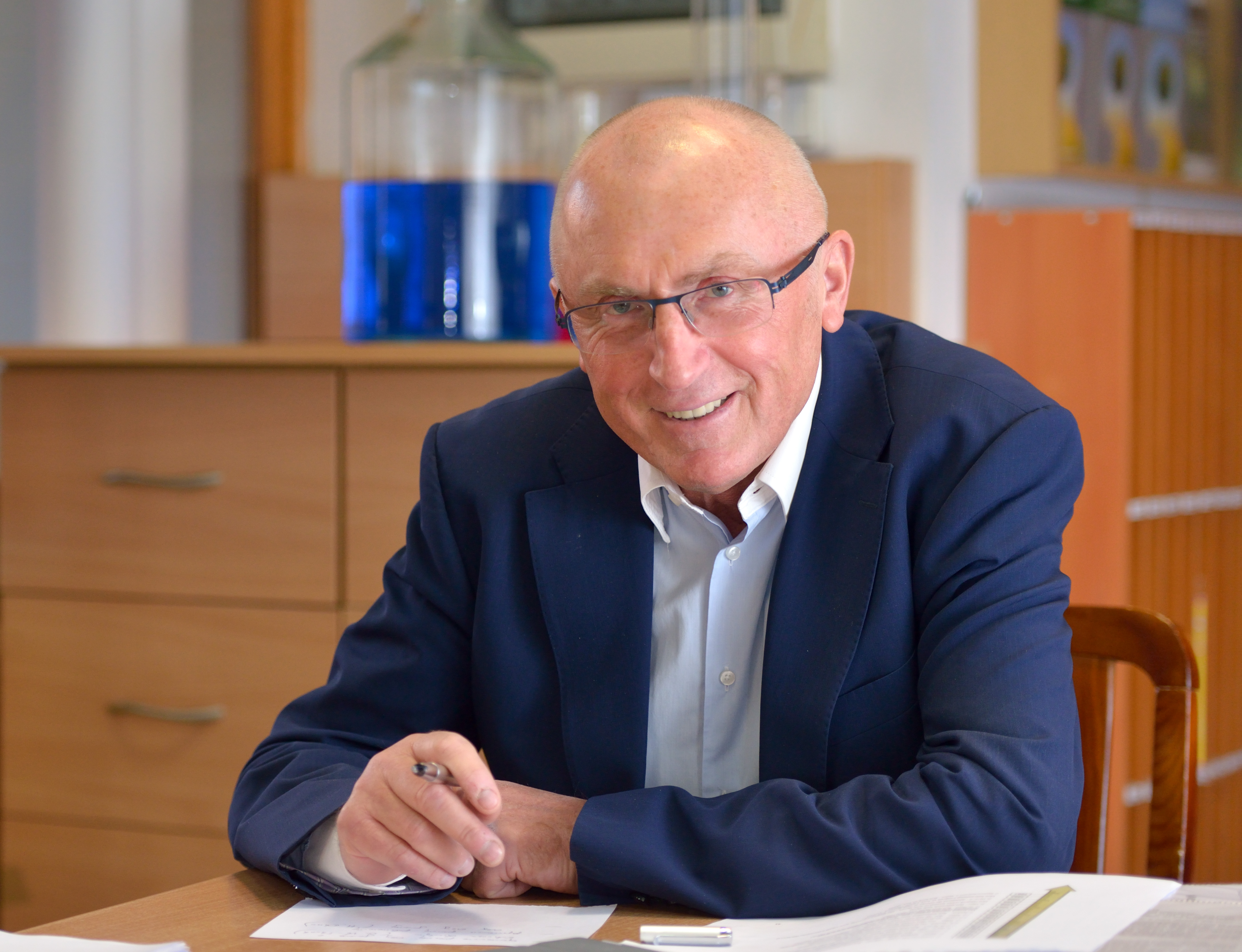
- Jacek Namieśnik in 2016
- Born: 10 December 1949; Mogilno, Poland
- Died: 14 April 2019 (aged 69); Gdańsk, Poland
- Citizenship: Polish
- Education: Gdańsk University of Technology
- Awards: Ribbon
- Scientific career
- Fields: Environmental chemistry, Analytical chemistry
- Thesis: Oznaczanie całkowitej zawartości węgla oraz zawartości węgla organicznego z lotnych zanieczyszczeń powietrza (The determination of total carbon and organic carbon in a volatile air pollutants) (1978)

Jacek Namieśnik (10 December 1949 in Mogilno – 14 April 2019 in Gdańsk) was a Polish chemist, full professor of Gdańsk University of Technology. He was head of Analytical Department (1995–2019), dean of Chemical Faculty (1996–2002, 2005–2012), rector of Gdańsk University of Technology since 1 September 2016 until his death.

== Biography ==
In 1967 he graduated from the First High School in Inowrocław and started his studies at the Chemical Faculty of Gdańsk University of Technology. After graduating in 1972, he began his scientific career at this university, earning his degree in chemistry in 1978. The subject of his dissertation, conducted under the supervision of prof. Edmund Kozłowski was "The Determination of the total content of carbon and the content of organic carbon from volatile air pollutants". In 1985, on the basis of the dissertation "Concentration of volatile organic air pollutants", he obtained a degree of habilitated doctor, and the title of professor of chemical sciences received on 15 January 1996.

In 1990–1996 he was a Deputy Dean for Education of the Chemical Faculty of Gdańsk University of Technology, and in 1996–2002 and again 2005–2012 Dean of this Faculty. Beginning in 1995 he was also the head of the Department of Analytical Chemistry, which has been awarded the Center of Excellence. Member of the Senate of the PG (since 1990) and head of the Doctoral Studies at the Chemical Faculty, Gdańsk University of Technology.

Elected to rector of Gdańsk University of Technology in 2016–2020

Simultaneously with the duties of the Rector of the Gdańsk University of Technology prof. Jacek Namieśnik held the function of Vice-President of the Conference of Rectors of Polish Technical Universities (KRPUT) from 2016 until his death in 2019.

== Teaching subjects ==
- Analytical Chemistry

== Lecturer ==
Jacek Namieśnik was the director of Doctoral Studies at the Chemical Faculty. The supervisor of 65 PhD thesis and 2 PhD thesis co-supervisor

== Research interests ==
- Environmental Chemistry
- Analytical Chemistry
- Green Analytical Chemistry

== Science achievements ==
Author and co-author of 1000 of publications listed on the Institute for Scientific Information list (cited 10657 times), numerous publications and 13 patents of the h-index h=50, ΣIF = 2339,537. He was also an active member of several editorial boards of scientific and scientific-technical magazines, and of advice and scientific committees. Supervisor or Co-supervisor of 65 PhD thesis (completed).

== Awards ==
Jacek Namieśnik has won numerous awards for outstanding scientific achievements.

- 1993 – Gold Cross of Merit
- 1995 – Medal of the National Education Commission
- 1998 – Order of Polonia Restituta - Knight's Cross
- 2005 – Order of Polonia Restituta - Officer's Cross
- 2016 – Order of Polonia Restituta - Commander's Cross
- 2017 – Prime Minister Award (individual)
- 2019 – Order of Polonia Restituta - Commander's Cross with Star (post mortem)

He was also awarded by numerous bodies and councils governmental, regional and scientific. Since 2007 he has been Professor honoris causa of the University of Bucharest. He also has honoris causa doctorates from Gdańsk Medical University and the Military University of Technology in Warsaw.

== Membership of societies ==
He was also very active outside of the home institution, as is evidenced by the large number of functions he performed in various academic and professional associations:

- Polish Chemical Society (Polskie Towarzystwo Chemiczne)
- Romanian Society of Analytical Chemistry
- International Union of Pure and Applied Chemistry – IUPAC (fellow since 2000)
- Steering Committee International Society of Environmental Analytical Chemistry – ISEAC (since 2002)
- Polish Central Commission for Academic Degrees and Titles (2007-2016)
- Committee on Analytical Chemistry of the Polish Academy of Sciences (PAS) since 1996, chairman of the Committee on Analytical Chemistry (2007-2015)
- Member of the Committee on Marine Research of the Polish Academy of Sciences (PAS) since 2007
- Member of Scientific Board Institute of Oceanology (PAS) since 2008
- Institute of Nuclear Chemistry and Technology (IChTiJ) since 2015
- European Academy of Sciences and Arts (EASA) since 2017

== Redactor ==
- Journal of Chromatography A (IF = 4,531)
- Critical Reviews in Environmental Sciences and Technology (Associate Editor) (IF = 4,541)
- Environmental Research (IF = 3,951)
- Critical Reviews in Analytical Chemistry (IF = 3,902)
- The Science of the Total Environment (IF = 3,163)
- Acta Chromatographica (IF = 0,760)
- Polish Journal of Environmental Studies (IF = 0,508)
- International Journal of Occupational Safety and Ergonomics (IF = 0,312)
- MethodsX
- Analityka (Wydawnictwo Malamut)
- Chemistry and Chemical Technology (Lviv, Ukraine)
- Aparatura Badawcza i Dydaktyczna

== Selected books ==
- Fizykochemiczne metody kontroli zanieczyszczeń środowiska (1988, red. ISBN 83-204-2289-2)
- Podstawy analityki (1992, co-authors: Jerzy Łukasiak, Zygmunt Jamrógiewicz, ISBN 83-85019-63-4)
- Zarys ekotoksykologii (1995, red., OCLC 750855661 Gdańsk, 1995)
- Pobieranie próbek środowiskowych do analizy (1995, co-authors: Jerzy Łukasiak and Zygmunt Jamrógiewicz, ISBN 83-01-11765-6)
- Przygotowanie próbek środowiskowych do analizy (2000, co-authors: Zygmunt Jamrógiewicz, Michał Pilarczyk and L. Torres, ISBN 83-204-2482-8)
- Ocena i kontrola jakości wyników analitycznych (2007, with Piotr Konieczka, ISBN 978-83-204-3255-8)
- Quality assurance and quality control in the analytical chemical laboratory: a practical approach (2009, with Piotr Konieczka, ISBN 1-4200-8270-1)
- Analytical Measurements in Aquatic Environments (2009, co-author: Piotr Szefer, ISBN 9781420082685)
