= Badge of Honour of Podlaskie Voivodeship =

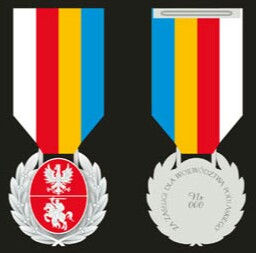
- Obverse and reverse of the version for people
- Native name: Odznaka Honorowa Województwa Podlaskiego
- Awarded for: Promotion and development of Podlaskie Voivodeship
- Country: Poland
- Presented by: Podlaskie Voivodeship executive board
- Ribbon
- Established: 3 July 2006
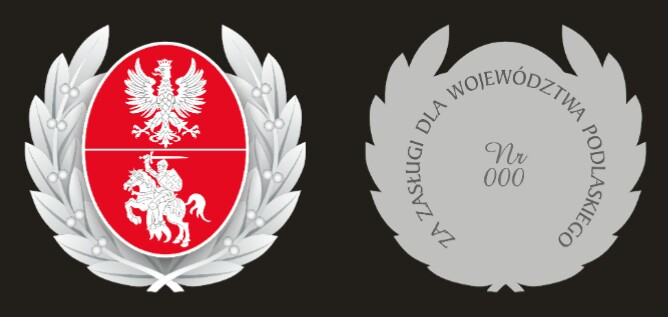
- Obverse and reverse of the version for organizations

Badge of Honour of Podlaskie Voivodeship (Polish: Odznaka Honorowa Województwa Podlaskiego) is an award given by the regional government Podlaskie Voivodeship, a province in north-east Poland.

== Criteria ==
The award was established on 3rd of July 2006 in accordance with a resolution XXXIX/510/06 of the Podlaskie Voivodeship Sejmik Its graphic design was made by Tadeusz Gajl. It is awarded to individuals, legal entities, including local government units and organizational units without legal personality, who, through their entire public, social and professional activities, have made outstanding contributions to the Podlaskie Voivodeship by cultivating Polishness and developing and shaping the national, civic and cultural awareness of its inhabitants, as well as by cultivating and developing local identity, stimulating economic activity, raising the level of competitiveness and innovation of the province's economy, preserving the value of the cultural and natural environment while taking into account the needs of future generations and shaping and maintaining spatial order".

In a period of one year, the badge is awarded to a maximum of fifteen individuals and five entities that are not natural persons.

Individuals wear the badge on the left chest (after all state decorations they hold, and before decorations from other countries), exclusively on formal attire, mainly during state and regional holidays, state ceremonies, regional and military.

== Design ==
The badge for individuals is in the shape of a medal made of metal in the color of oxidized silver, with a diameter of 40 mm. On the main side there is the emblem from the coat of arms of Podlaskie Voivodeship, on an oval, red enameled shield, enclosed by a wreath of two stylized laurel branches with a tie at the bottom with a rectangular eyelet for hanging at the top, in the break in the wreath. The reverse side is smooth, with the consecutive number of the badge placed inside; the whole surrounded by the inscription in capital letters FOR MERITS FOR THE PODLASKIE VOIVODESHIP. The badge is worn suspended on a grosgrain, four-color ribbon, 36 mm wide, in the colors of the flag of the Podlaskie Voivodeship, with stripes of equal width placed vertically; from the left: white, red, yellow and light blue. On the reverse of the ribbon at the top there is a strip of metal as above, with a "safety pin" fastening. The badge for entities that are not natural persons has the same appearance as the individual badge, except for the diameter - 70 mm. It also does not have an ear at the top or a ribbon.

== Selected receipents ==
- Wojciech Fortuna
- Krzysztof Penderecki
- Piotr Markiewicz
- Bogusław Dębski
- Jacek Rutkowski
