= Wojciech Fortuna =

Polish ski jumper

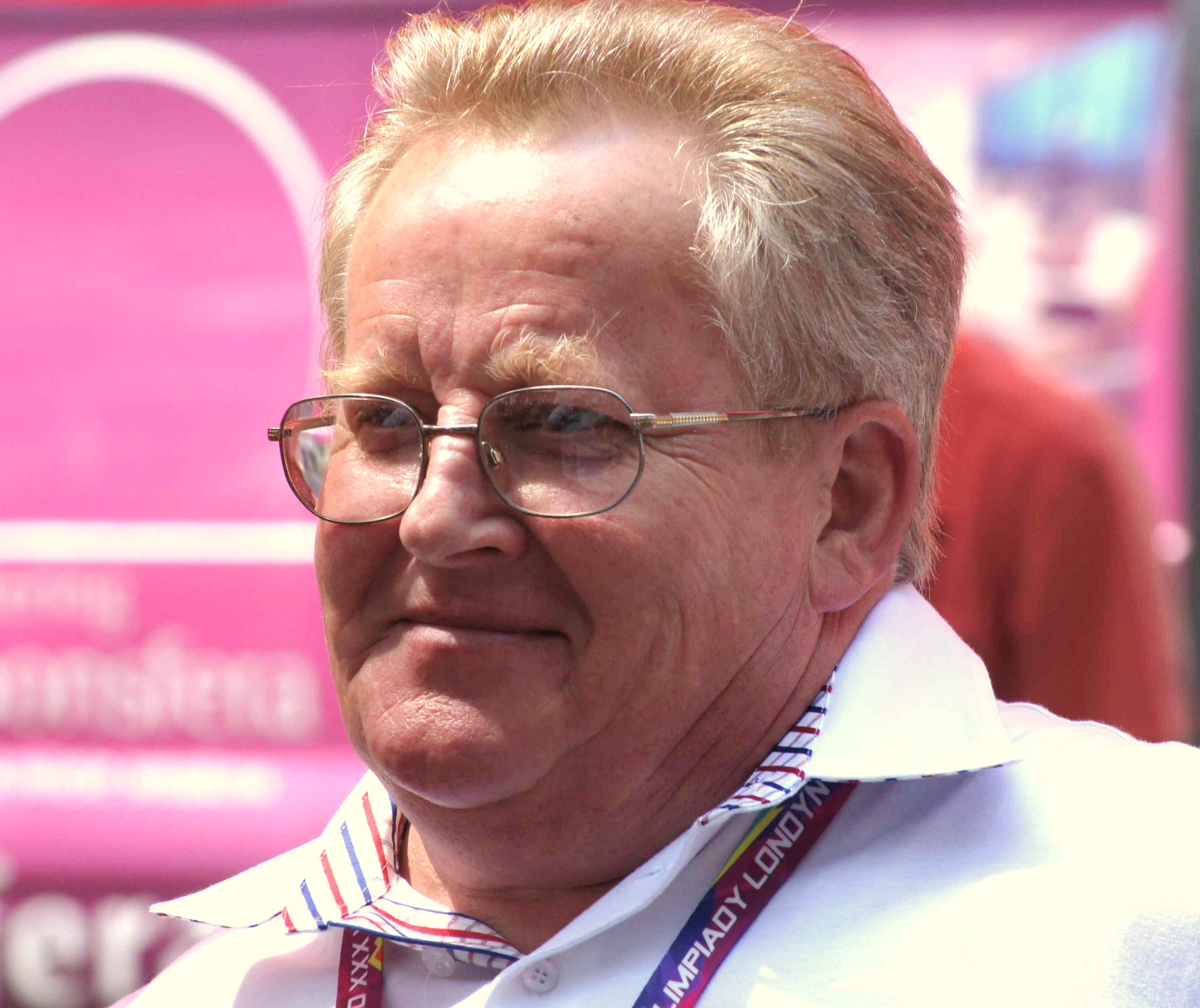

Personal information
- Born: 6 August 1952 (age 73) Zakopane, Poland
- Height: 1.65 m (5 ft 5 in)

Sport
- Sport: Skiing
- Club: Wisła-Gwardia Zakopane

World Cup career
- Seasons: 1962–1975

Achievements and titles
- Personal bests: 132.0 m (Planica, 1972)
Medal record
Men's ski jumping
Representing Poland
Olympic Games
| Gold medal – first place | 1972 Sapporo | Individual large hill |
World Championships
| Gold medal – first place | 1972 Sapporo | Individual large hill |
- Updated on 31 January 2020

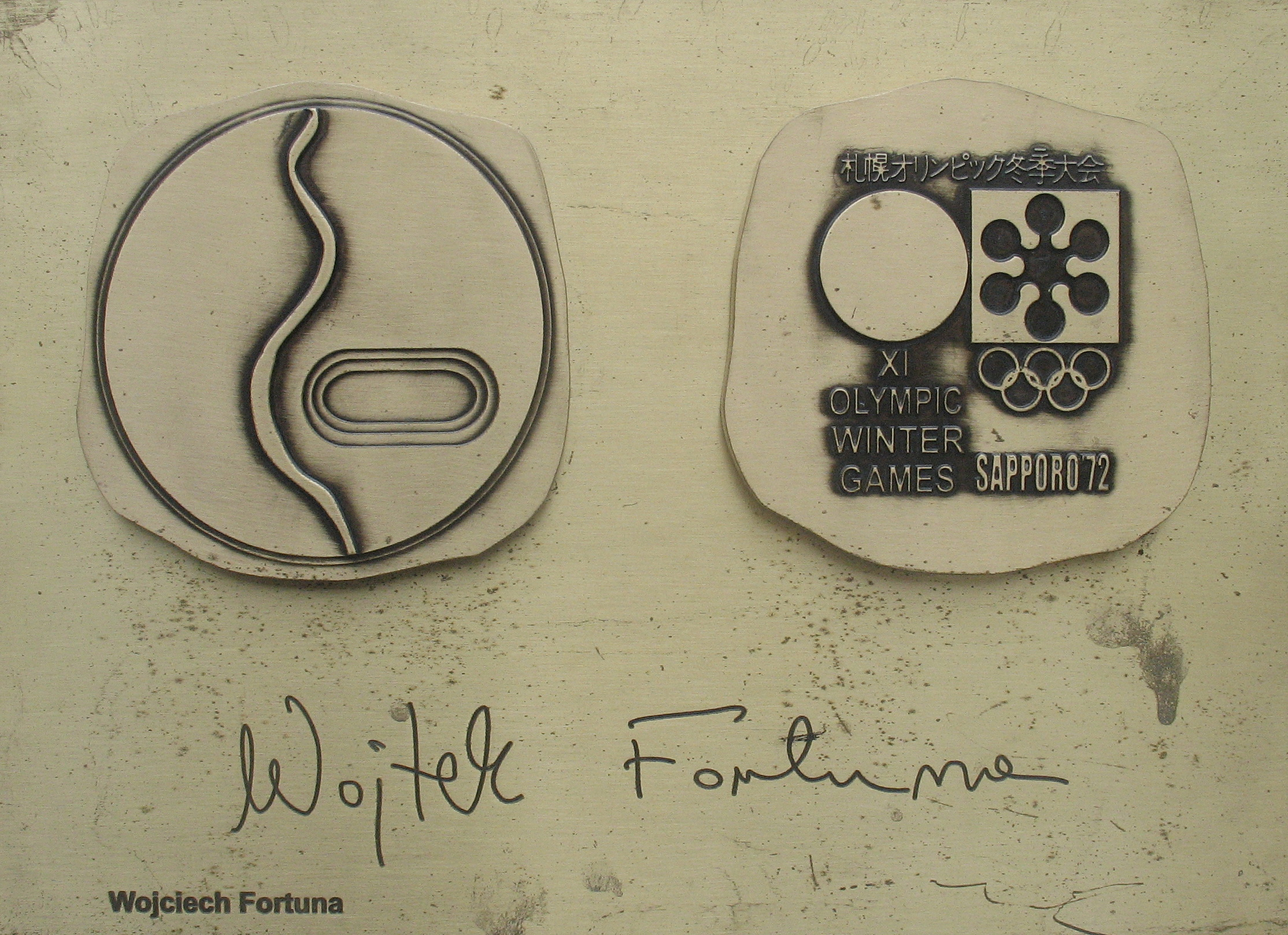
Copy of W. Fortuna medal and autograph in Alei Gwiazd Sportu w Dziwnowie

Wojciech Fortuna (born 6 August 1952) is a Polish former ski jumper who won the Olympic gold medal in the Large Hill at the 1972 Winter Olympics in Sapporo. In the Normal Hill, he finished 6th. The Gold Medal was Poland's first – and the only gold until Vancouver 2010 – in the history of the Winter Olympics. Four-time participant of the Four Hills Tournament, with his best ranking was during the XXI edition, achieving 18th place. He was awarded the Badge of Honour of Podlaskie Voivodeship.

He competed from 1969 to 1979.
