= Order of Merit (Chile) =

Chilean national civil order

Order of Merit (Orden al Mérito)
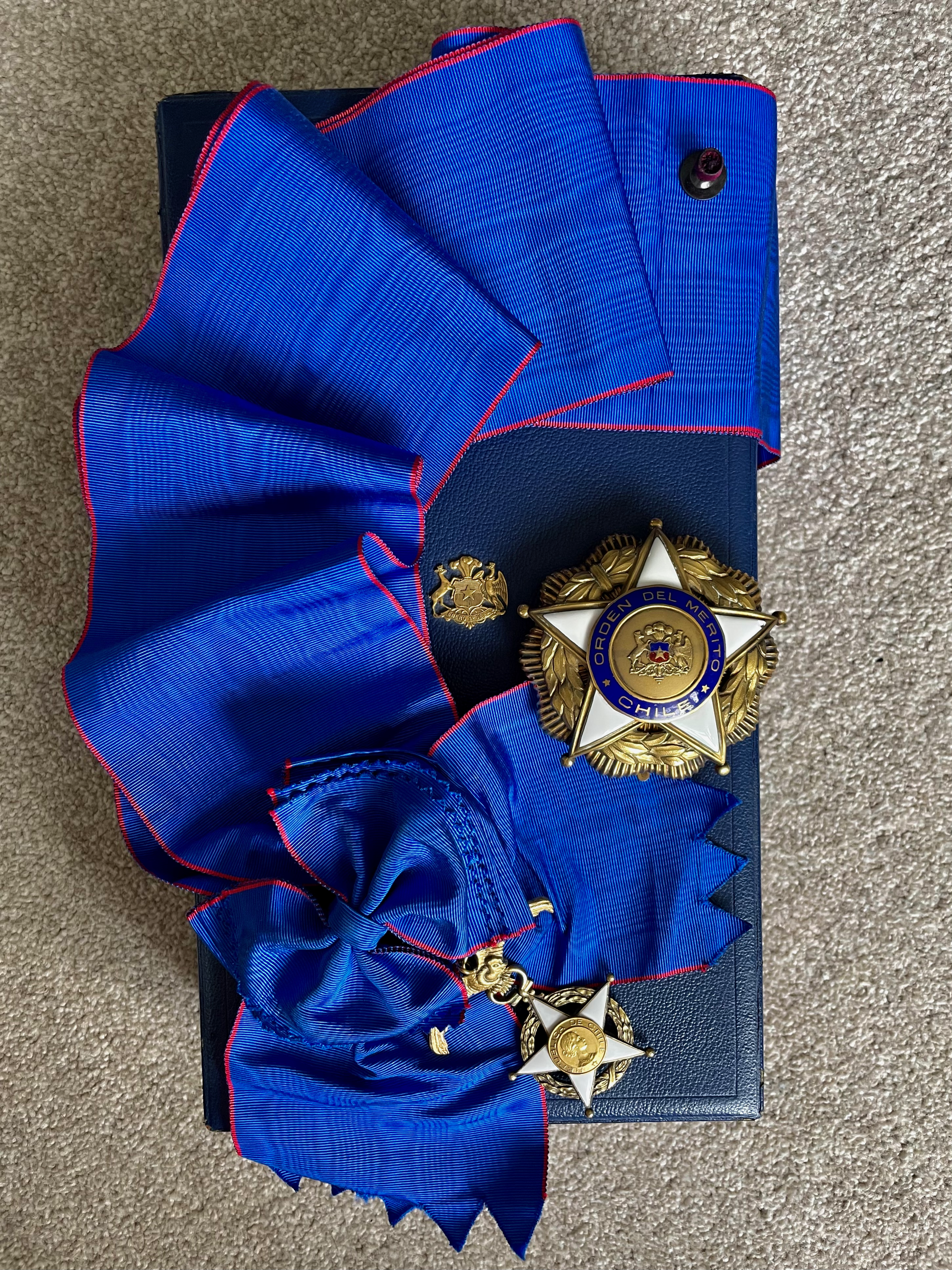

Awarded by the President of Chile
- Type: Order of merit
- Established: 1817 (as Legion of Merit); 1906 (as Medal of the Merit); 1929 (as Order of Merit)
- Eligibility: Foreigner citizens
- Awarded for: Civil actions in benefit of the Republic
- Status: Current
- Founder: Bernardo O'Higgins (1817); Germán Riesco (1906); Carlos Ibáñez del Campo (1929)
- President: José Antonio Kast
- Chancellor: Alberto van Klaveren
- Grades: Collar; Grand Cross; Grand Officer; Commander; Officer; Knight

Precedence
- Next (higher): None
- Next (lower): Order of Bernardo O'Higgins

The Order of Merit (Spanish: Orden al Mérito) is a Chilean order of merit and was created in 1929. Succeeding the Medal of the Merit, which was created during the term of the President Germán Riesco through the Minister of War decree No. 1350 on 4 September 1906. This new national distinction was created to recognize the meritorious service provided by foreign military personnel to Chilean officials. The order is only awarded to foreigners.

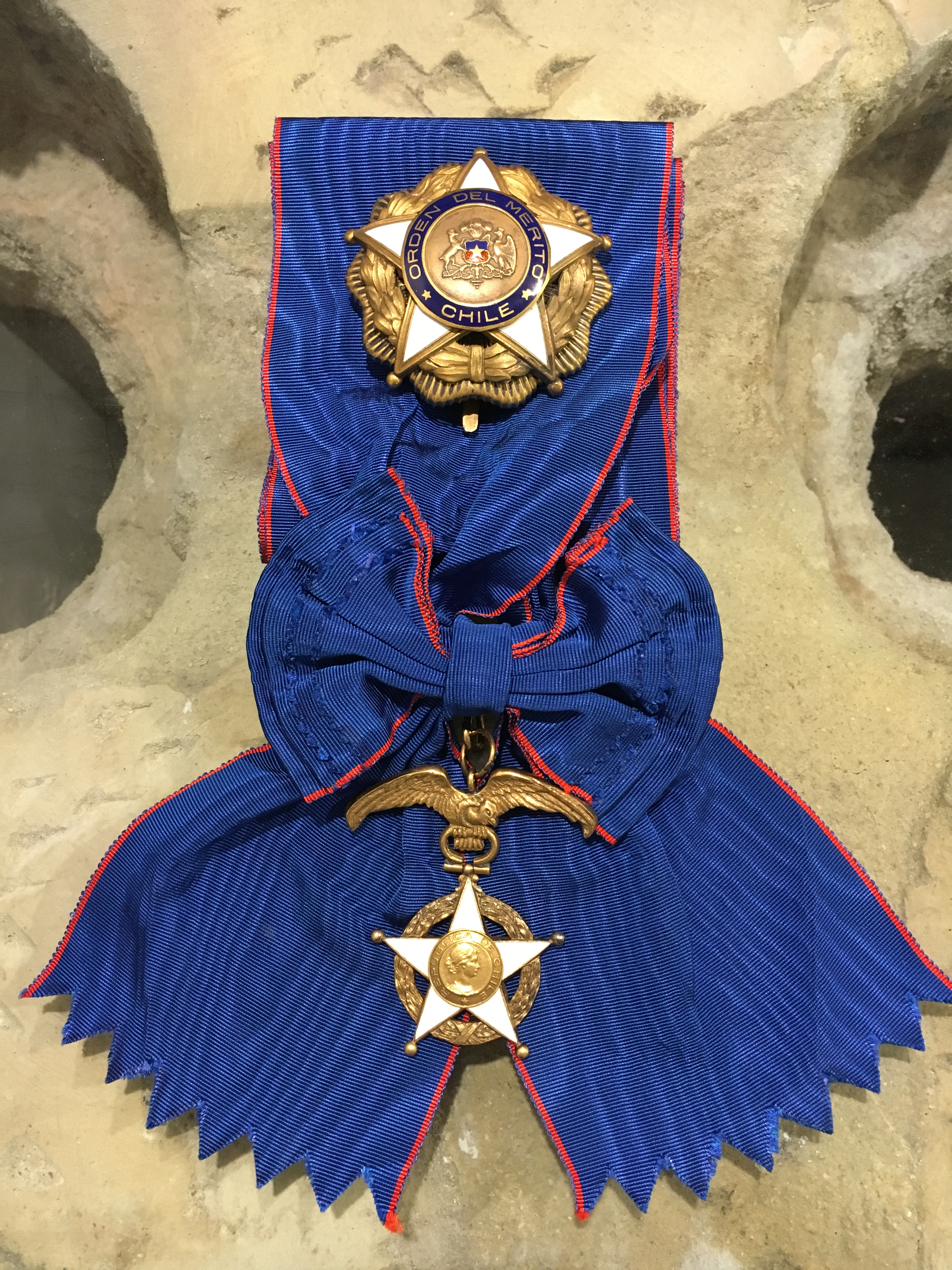
Grand Cross of the Order of Merit (Chile)

== History ==
In 1817, Bernardo O'Higgins created the Legion of Merit, with the aim of recognizing the ones who have provided help to Chile, specially during its independence. In 1823, when O'Higgins fled the country after his abdication, the Legion was extinct.

Nevertheless, in 1906, Germán Riesco created the Medal of the Merit, with the same aim as the current Order: award those who gave civil services to the Republic. The first 200 military medals were minted in gold and silver, giving them the title of First and Second Class. They were minted at the Casa de la Moneda, having a tricolor ribbon. The order had three classes: First, Second, and Third Class; but later a new class was added (Grand Officer) that would be awarded to heads of state.

In 1929, the Medal was renamed as the Order of Merit, and the current regulations were enacted in 2000, being slightly reformed in 2016.

== Grades ==
The President of Chile is the Gran Master of the Order. The Chancellor is the minister of Foreign Affairs.

- Collar (Spanish: Collar)
- Grand Cross (Spanish: Gran Cruz)
- Grand Officer (Spanish: Gran Oficial)
- Commander (Spanish: Comendador)
- Officer (Spanish: Oficial)
- Knight (Spanish: Caballero)

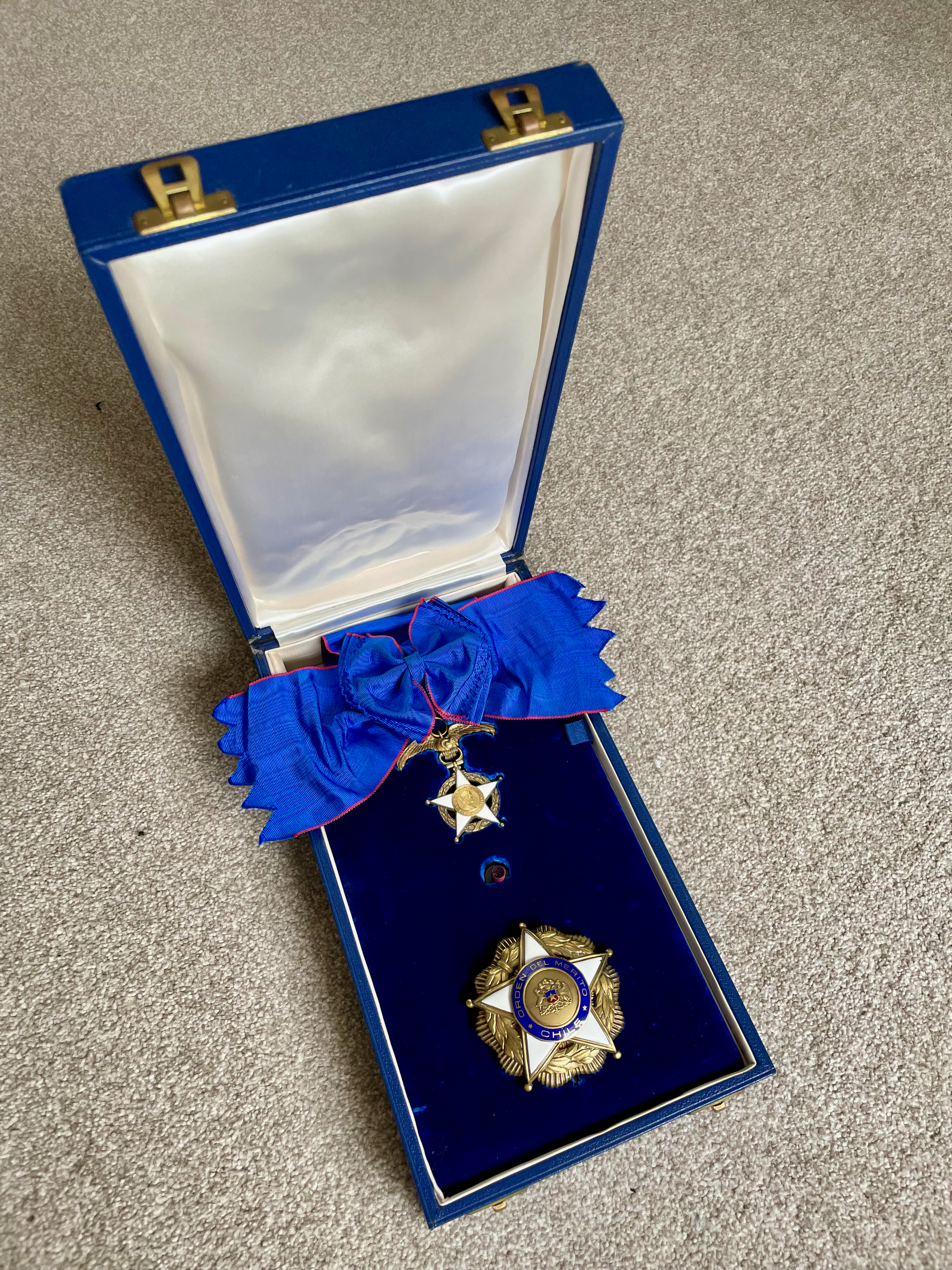
Grand Cross grade of the Order.

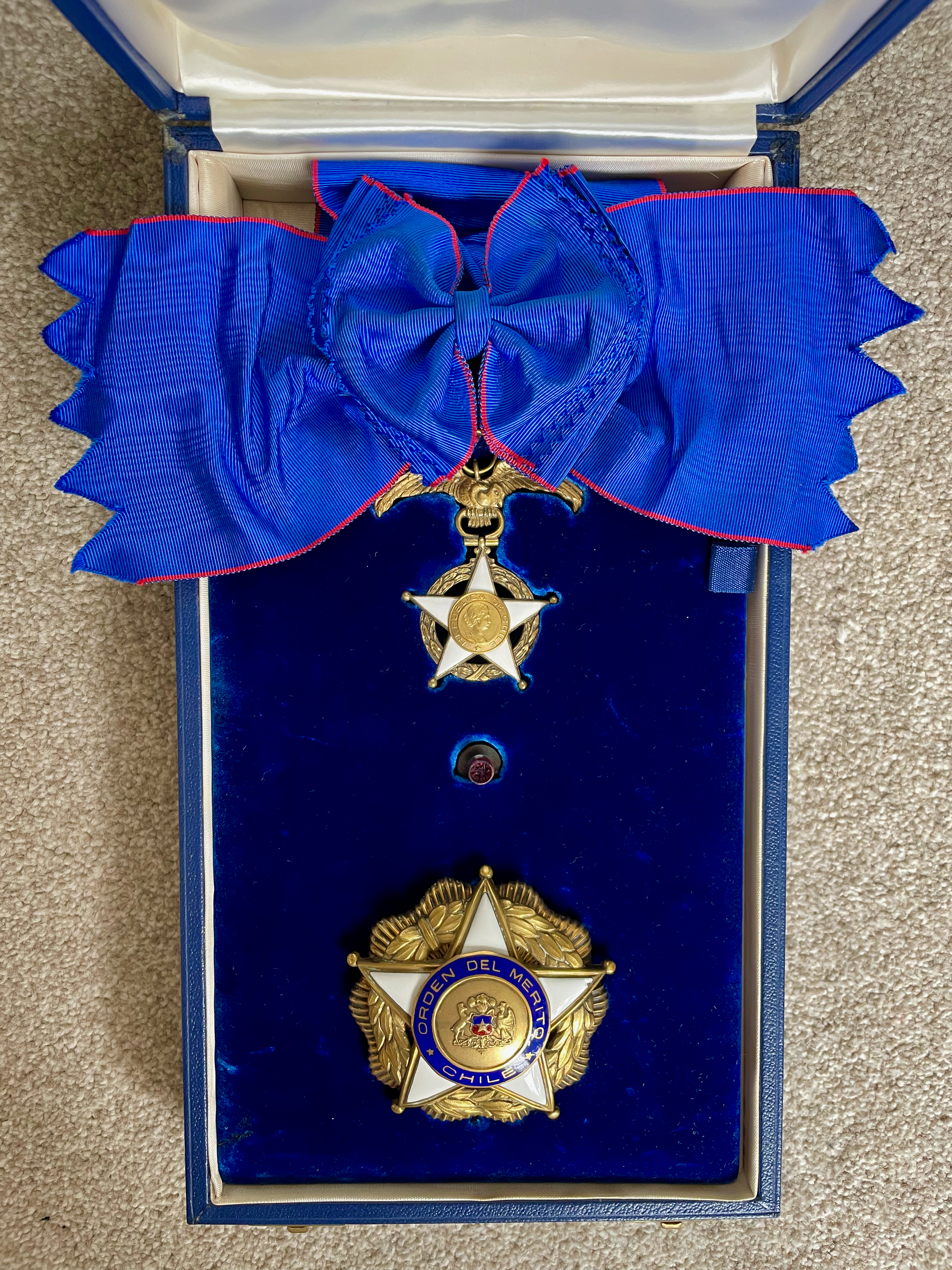
Grand Cross set of insignia.

== Insignia ==
The Order’s design is made up of a gold five-pointed star enamelled in white, backed by a gold laurel wreath. The central disc bears a representation of the national personification of Chile. The outer ring of the central disk is inscribed with "Republica de Chile" (Republic of Chile). The badge hangs from a gold figurine representing an Andean condor, the national bird of Chile. The Star of the Grand Cross grade is made up of a ten-pointed, highly curved star fronted by a gold laurel wreath. Placed on this is another five-pointed white-enamelled star with a central gold disc. The outer edge of the disc is enamelled in blue with the inscription "Orden del Merito Chile" (Order of Merit Chile). The centre of the disc is emblazoned with a representation of the coat of arms of Chile. The badge of the Order is the same for the Collar, Grand Cross, Grand Officer and Commander grades; for the two lowest grades, Officer and Knight, the same basic design is used but instead of being enamelled in white, the star is enamelled in blue and red respectively. The Order’s ribbon is made up of a blue field edged very thinly in red. This is the reverse of the ribbon for the other Chilean order of chivalry, the Order of Bernardo O'Higgins.

Insignia
Collar	Breast Star (Collar, Grand Cross and Grand Officer)	Grand Cross	Grand Officer and Commander
Order's Badge (Collar, Grand Cross, Grand Officer and Commander)	Officer's Cross	Knight's Cross	

== Recipients ==
- Wilhelm Adam
- Konrad Adenauer
- Martti Ahtisaari
- Jorge Alessandri
- José Arce
- Henry H. Arnold
- Patricio Aylwin
- Michelle Bachelet
- Leszek Balcerowicz
- Andrew Bertie
- Bhumibol Adulyadej
- Rafael Caldera
- Felipe Calderón
- Prince Carl Philip, Duke of Värmland
- Horacio Cartes
- William J. Crowe, Jr.
- Aníbal Cavaco Silva
- Fernando Collor
- António Costa
- Carlos Manuel de Céspedes y Quesada
- Eduard Dietl
- Osvaldo Dorticós Torrado
- Willem Anthony Engelbrecht
- Matthew Festing
- Frederik X, King of Denmark
- Eduardo Frei Montalva
- Narciso Garay
- Prince George, Duke of Kent
- José Patricio Guggiari
- Władysław Günther-Schwarzburg
- António Guterres
- Christian Günther
- William Halsey, Jr.
- Miklós Horthy
- Ted Kennedy
- Aleksander Kwaśniewski
- Luis Alberto Lacalle
- José Antonio de Lavalle y García
- Curtis LeMay
- Maurice August Lippens
- Joseph Taggart McNarney
- George Marshall
- Queen Máxima of the Netherlands
- Zoran Milanović
- Thomas Hinman Moorer
- Ignacy Mościcki
- Valentín Paniagua
- Aleksandra Piątkowska
- Augusto Pinochet
- Koča Popović
- Miguel Primo de Rivera
- Mariano Rajoy
- Kazimierz Raszewski
- Marcelo Rebelo de Sousa
- Nelson Rockefeller
- Karol Adam Romer
- Jorge Sampaio
- Raúl Sapena Pastor
- Julio María Sanguinetti
- José Serrato
- Birendra Bir Bikram Shah Dev
- Krzysztof Skubiszewski
- Sonoda Sunao
- Frans Timmermans (politician)
- Alejandro Toledo
- Rafael Leónidas Trujillo
- Franjo Tuđman
- Victoria, Crown Princess of Sweden
- Baron Oscar Von Kohorn
- Willem-Alexander of the Netherlands
- Elizabeth II of the United Kingdom
- August Zaleski
- Arthur Zimmermann
- Mizan Zainal Abidin of Terengganu

== References and links ==
- Condecoraciones, Ministerio de Relaciones Exteriores de Chile.
