= Jacek Popiel =

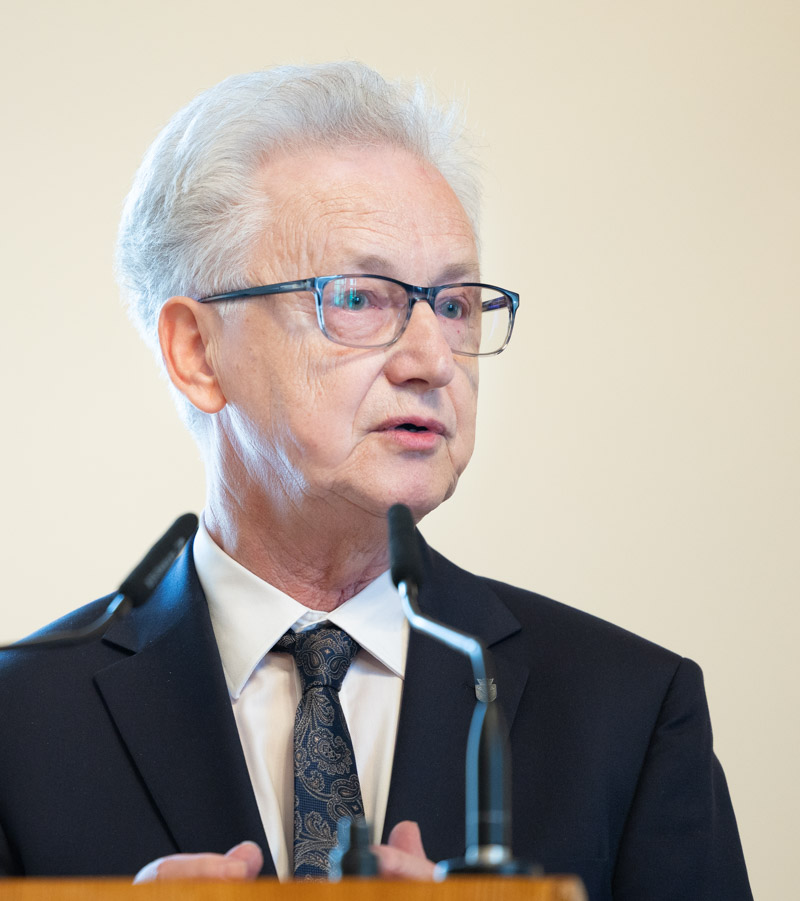
- Jacek Popiel, 2026 photo by Adam Walanus
- Born: Kraków, Poland
- Education: Jagiellonian University (BA, MA, PhD)
- Awards: Cross of Merit (Poland) (2002) Gloria Artis Medal for Merit to Culture (2008) Order of Polonia Restituta (2012)

Jacek Józef Popiel (born August 1, 1954, in Kraków, Poland) is a Polish theatre and literary scholar and professor of humanities, who was a Rector of Jagiellonian University from 2020 until 2024. He has served in various prominent academic roles, including as Rector of the Ludwik Solski State Drama School in Kraków from 1996 to 1999 and again from 1999 to 2002. Popiel is also a member of the Polish Academy of Arts and Sciences. His research focuses on the history of Polish drama and theatre, with particular emphasis on the 19th to 21st centuries, and he has published extensively on these topics.

== Research ==
Jacek Józef Popiel's research has significantly contributed to the fields of theatre and literary studies, with a particular focus on the development of Polish drama from the 19th to the 21st centuries. He has delved into topics such as the history of the Polish Rhapsodic Theatre, the portrayal of the Holocaust in Polish theatre, and the broader cultural and social impacts of these dramatic forms. His work is known for its deep exploration of how Polish theatre reflects and influences societal values, particularly in times of national crisis.

Popiel's scholarly contributions have earned him several distinguished awards. In 2008, he was awarded the Gold Medal for Merit to Culture – Gloria Artis. In 2012, he received the Knight's Cross of the Order of Polonia Restituta, recognizing his significant contributions to Polish education and culture.
