= Aleksandra Piątkowska =

Polish politician

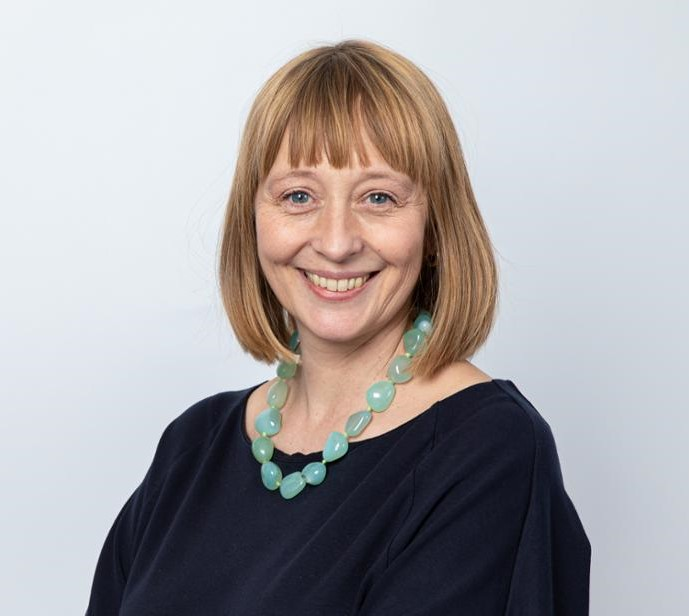

Poland Ambassador to Chile
- In office 2012–2017
- Preceded by: Ryszard Piasecki
- Succeeded by: Jacek Gawryszewski

Poland Ambassador to Argentina
- In office 27 June 2019 – July 2024
- Preceded by: Marek Pernal

Personal details
- Born: Warsaw, Poland
- Spouse: Jacek Piątkowski
- Children: 1 daughter
- Education: University of Warsaw
- Profession: Diplomat

Aleksandra Maria Piątkowska (born in Warsaw) is a Polish civil servant and diplomat, serving as an ambassador to Chile (2012–2017) and Argentina (2019-2024).

== Education and career ==
Piątkowska is a graduate of International Relations from University of Warsaw (1992). In 1993, she began her career at the Ministry of Foreign Affairs. She was responsible for human rights and OSCE issues. She was seconded to the High Commissioner on National Minorities office in Geneva. Between 1996 and 2001, she worked as Second Secretary at the Permanent Mission to the United Nations in New York as an expert on Latin America, Caribbean and the Balkans. During her term in New York, Piątkowska was a member of the UN Security Council (1996–1997). Following her return from New York, she worked at the Security Policy Department as a First Secretary and Counselor. She was cooperating with Office for Democratic Institutions and Human Rights at that time. Later, she was the director of the Information System Department and the Department of Public and Cultural Diplomacy.

In 2012, Piątkowska became Poland ambassador to Chile. She presented her credentials to the President of Chile Sebastián Piñera on 8 October 2012. She ended her term in 2017. Afterwards, she was the director of the Department of Development Cooperation. On 27 June 2019, she became ambassador to Argentina, accredited also to Paraguay and Uruguay. She ended her mission in July 2024.

She authored several articles on international relations.

Besides Polish, Piątkowska speaks English and Spanish. She is married to Jacek Piątkowski, with a daughter.

== Honours ==
- Grand Cross of the Order of Merit (Chile), 2017
