= Jacek Rybicki =

Polish politician (1959–2024)

Member of the Sejm
- In office 20 October 1997 – 18 October 2001

Personal details
- Born: 25 March 1959 Gdańsk, Poland
- Died: September 2024 (aged 65)
- Party: RS
- Education: University of Gdańsk
- Occupation: Trade unionist

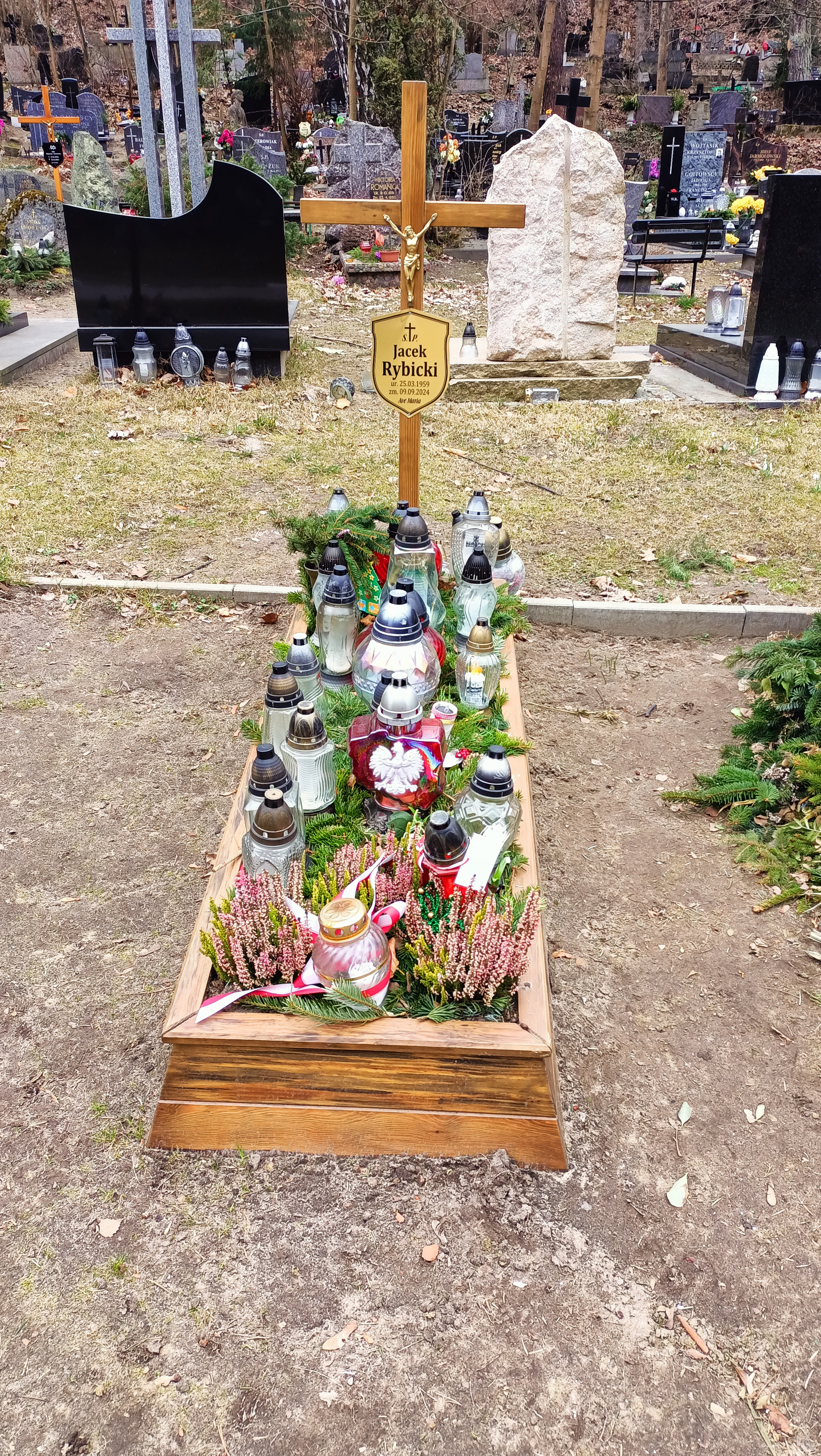
Jacek Rybicki's grave

Jacek Rybicki (25 March 1959 – September 2024) was a Polish trade unionist and politician. A member of the Social Movement, he served in the Sejm from 1997 to 2001.

Rybicki died in September 2024, at the age of 65.
