= Jacek Szmatka =

Polish sociologist (1950–2001)

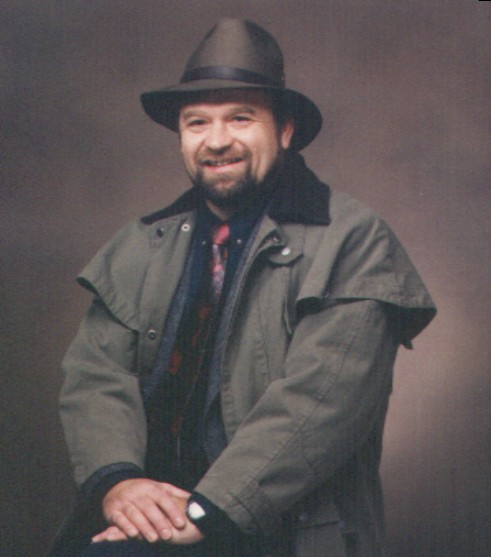
Jacek Szmatka

Jacek Szmatka (28 March 1950 – 20 October 2001) was a Polish sociologist. Professor the Jagiellonian University, visiting professor in a number of American universities State University of New York (Buffalo), Stanford University (Stanford), University of Washington (Seattle), University of South Carolina (Columbia).

He was a member of the International Advisory Editors of Encyclopedia of Sociology, and the author of two books and a number of sociological articles.
