= Jacek Gawryszewski =

Polish diplomat

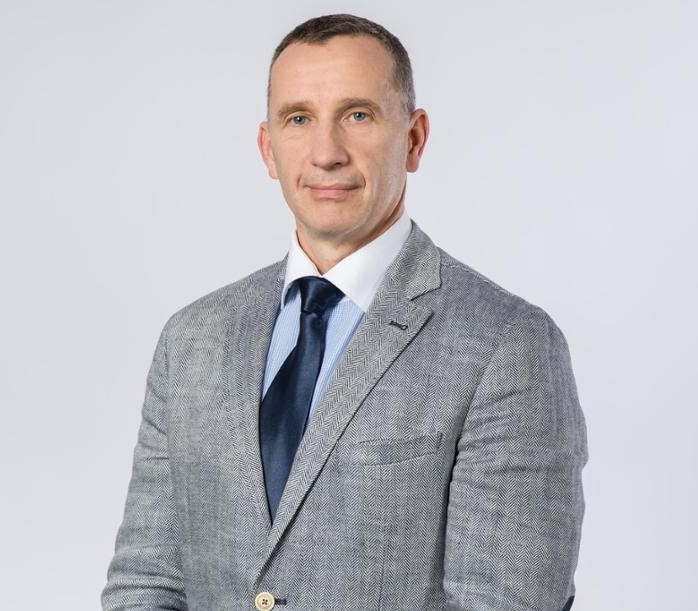

Poland Ambassador to Chile
- In office 28 August 2017 – 31 July 2024
- Preceded by: Aleksandra Piątkowska

Personal details
- Born: Jacek Winek; 20 March 1966 (age 60) Warsaw, Poland
- Education: University of Warsaw
- Profession: Diplomat, civil intelligence officer

Jacek Gawryszewski (born Jacek Winek; 20 March 1966) is a Polish colonel of civil intelligence service and diplomat, ambassador to Chile from 2017 to 2024.

== Life ==
Jacek Gawryszewski holds an M.A. in international relations from the University of Warsaw (1992). He has been also post-graduate student of journalism (1995).

During the 1980s he was active member of Solidarity movement. In 1986, he was sentenced for one year and seven months in prison for political reasons.

Between 1991 and 2002 he was officer of the Office for State Protection, and, from 2002 he served at the Internal Security Agency. From 2006 to 2007 he was the director of the Department of Counterterrorism. Between 2013 and 5 October 2017 he was deputy chief of the Agency.

He has been working at the embassies in Tunis, in charge of security of the embassy (1999–2000), Bogotá, being responsible for consular services among others (2000–2005), Mexico City (2007–2008), representing Poland to Mexico as chargé d'affaires, and Berlin (2009) as a specialist for security issues of German-Polish relations.

On 28 August 2017 Jacek Gawryszewski was nominated ambassador to Chile. He presented his letter of credence to the President of Chile Michelle Bachelet on 25 October 2017. He ended his term on 31 July 2024.

Gawryszewski, beside Polish, speaks English, Spanish, and German languages. He is married.

== Honours ==
- Cross of Freedom and Solidarity, 2015
- Bronze Medal of Merit for National Defence, 2012
- Knight's Cross of the Order of Polonia Restituta, 2011
- Silver Medal for Long Service, 2011
- Bronze Cross of Merit, 2006
