= Jacek Szczurowski =

18th century Polish composer

Jacek Szczurowski (first name also Hyacinthus; 15 August 1716 – after 1773) was a Polish Jesuit, musician and composer. He was one of the first Polish composers of a symphony (1740, later lost.)

== Life ==
Szczurowski was born in Red Ruthenia in Poland-Lithuania on 15 August 1716. He entered a Jesuit monastery on 14 November 1735 as a novice and received the orders as a Jesuit on November 20, 1737. He was a member of the Kraków Music College run by the Jesuits. In the college's inventory from 1741, 38 works by Jacek Szczurowski are already mentioned. He served as assistant to the prefect of the college and later was sexton in monasteries in Kalisz, Krosno, Danzig (today Gdańsk), Thorn (today Toruń), Kraków, Jarosław, Posen (today Poznań) and Wałcz (near Poznań: the last record about him comes from here.) He died after 1773; the exact date of death is not known.

Few of his vocal compositions survive, although Szczurowski was one of the most prolific Polish composers of the 18th century.

== Works ==
(Source)

- Memento rerum conditor, 4vv, 2 vn, 2 hn, bc.
- Dziecino Boże (The Christ Child), 1v, 2 ob, bc.
- Mass in D, 2vv, 2 vn, 2 clarinos, bc.
- Vesperae per sanctis, 2vv, 2 vn, 2 clarinos, bc, inc.
- Missa Emmanuelis, 4vv, 2 vn, 2 hn, bc, PL-Pa.
- Caeli cives occurite, SATB, 2 vn, 2 clarinos, bc, CZp.
- Domine non sum diguns, 1v, 2 vn, bc, Pu.
- Litaniae de BVM, 4vv, 2 vn, 2 clarinos, bc.
- 38 sacred and instrumental works, formerly in the Jesuit College in Kraków, lost

(Source)

- Memento rerum conditor, 4vv, 2 vn, 2 hn, bc.
- Dziecino Boże (The Christ Child), 1v, 2 ob, bc.
- Mass in D, 2vv, 2 vn, 2 clarinos, bc.
- Vesperae per sanctis, 2vv, 2 vn, 2 clarinos, bc, inc.
- Missa Emmanuelis, 4vv, 2 vn, 2 hn, bc, PL-Pa.
- Caeli cives occurite, SATB, 2 vn, 2 clarinos, bc, CZp.
- Domine non sum diguns, 1v, 2 vn, bc, Pu.
- Litaniae de BVM, 4vv, 2 vn, 2 clarinos, bc.
- 38 sacred and instrumental works, formerly in the Jesuit College in Kraków, lost

(Source)

- Memento rerum conditor, 4vv, 2 vn, 2 hn, bc.
- Dziecino Boże (The Christ Child), 1v, 2 ob, bc.
- Mass in D, 2vv, 2 vn, 2 clarinos, bc.
- Vesperae per sanctis, 2vv, 2 vn, 2 clarinos, bc, inc.
- Missa Emmanuelis, 4vv, 2 vn, 2 hn, bc, PL-Pa.
- Caeli cives occurite, SATB, 2 vn, 2 clarinos, bc, CZp.
- Domine non sum diguns, 1v, 2 vn, bc, Pu.
- Litaniae de BVM, 4vv, 2 vn, 2 clarinos, bc.
- 38 sacred and instrumental works, formerly in the Jesuit College in Kraków, lost

(Source)

- Memento rerum conditor, 4vv, 2 vn, 2 hn, bc.
- Dziecino Boże (The Christ Child), 1v, 2 ob, bc.
- Mass in D, 2vv, 2 vn, 2 clarinos, bc.
- Vesperae per sanctis, 2vv, 2 vn, 2 clarinos, bc, inc.
- Missa Emmanuelis, 4vv, 2 vn, 2 hn, bc, PL-Pa.
- Caeli cives occurite, SATB, 2 vn, 2 clarinos, bc, CZp.
- Domine non sum diguns, 1v, 2 vn, bc, Pu.
- Litaniae de BVM, 4vv, 2 vn, 2 clarinos, bc.
- 38 sacred and instrumental works, formerly in the Jesuit College in Kraków, lost

== Bibliography ==
- Andrzej Chodkowski (Hrsg.): Encyclopedia of music. PWN, Warsaw 1995, ISBN 83-01-11390-1.
- Maciej Jochymczyk, in: 'Polski Słownik Biograficzny'. Vol. 47. Warsaw–Kraków: Polska Akademia Nauk of the Polska Akademia Umiejętności – Instytut Historii PAN im. Tadeusza Manteuffla, 2011, pp. 505–506. ISBN 978-83-88909-93-1.
- Zygmunt M. Szweykowski: Szczurowski, Jacek [Hyacinthus]. In: New Grove Dictionary of Music and Musicians (Online Edition).
