= Jacek Rutkowski =

Polish geologist

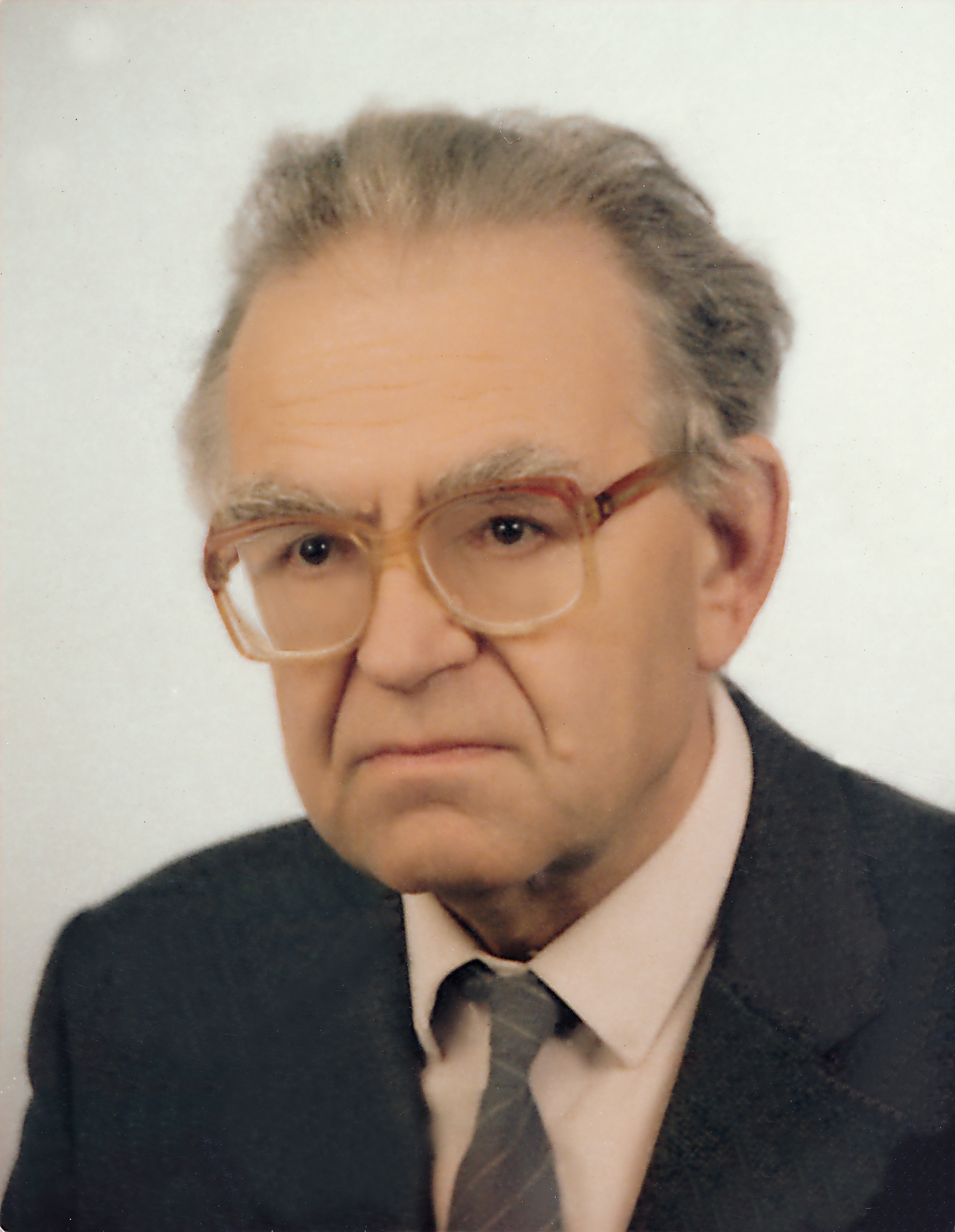
- Born: 3 April 1934; Zamość, Poland
- Died: 25 January 2016 (aged 81); Kraków, Poland
- Citizenship: Poland
- Education: AGH University of Science and Technology in Kraków
- Awards: Order of Polonia Restituta; Cross of Merit; Badge of Honour of Podlaskie Voivodeship
- Scientific career
- Fields: geology
- Workplaces: AGH University of Science and Technology in Kraków (1956-2004)

Jacek Rutkowski (3 April 1934 – 25 January 2016) – Polish geologist, scientist, professor at AGH University of Science and Technology in Kraków.

== Life and education ==
Jacek Rutkowski was born in 1934 in Zamość. In 1951, he graduated from Bartłomiej Nowodworski high school in Kraków and began geology studies at the AGH University of Science and Technology. He obtained his master's diploma in 1956, and in the same year, he was accepted as an assistant at the Department of Non-metallic Ore Deposits headed by Prof. Marian Kamieński. In 1959, he became a senior assistant. A year later, after completing supplementary studies, he obtained a master's degree in geology of solid mineral deposits. In 1963, he obtained a doctorate in technical sciences based on the work "Litological development and usage significance of the Senon area of Miechów" and became an adjunct. Jacek Rutkowski obtained his habilitation in the field of deposit geology in 1976. In 1987, he became an associate professor, and in 1995, he became a full professor. In 1979, he moved to the Department of Geological Cartography (currently Department of Environmental Analyses, Cartography, and Economic Geology) at his home faculty. Between 1979 and 1989, he was the head of the Department. He died in 2016 and was buried at the Rakowicki Cemetery in Kraków.

== Work ==
Professor Rutkowski dealt with both basic and applied research. In the first period of his scientific career, he mainly studied petrography, sedimentation, and physical properties of carbonate rocks, sandstones, gravels, and mineral resources. After his transfer to the Department of Geological Cartography, his research interests extended to issues of Quaternary geology, geomorphology, and geological mapping.

His greatest achievements included research into the lithology of the Niecka Niedziańska chalk, conditions of sedimentation and lithology of Sarmatian limestones from the south-western Świętokrzyskie Mountains, tectonics and Quaternary deposits around Kraków, as well as the environment of Wigry Lake. In addition, he developed his own, currently widely used, Quaternary gravel research method, and he was a pioneer in Poland in the universal use of aerial and satellite images. The images were used for geological and geomorphological cartography, as well as for the use of high-resolution seismics for lake sediment research. He developed his own gravitational core probe for collecting sediments from the lake bottom. Together with Prof. Elżbieta Mycielska-Dowgiałło, he co-edited and contributed to two books: “Researches of Quaternary sediments, some methods, and interpretation of the results” (1995) and another one on studies of textural features of Quaternary sediments and some methods of their dating (2007).

At his Alma Mater, Jacek Rutkowski lectured on geomorphology, Quaternary geology, geological mapping, and structural geology. He conveyed his scientific passion to students, first and foremost, during field courses and field research.

Prof. Rutkowski devoted the last 20 years of his life to studies of Lake Wigry in the Suwałki Region. His unique achievement was the organization of an informal, interdisciplinary team of scientists from all over Poland, from students to renowned professors. The group members, drawn by the authority and personality of the professor, under his leadership, devoted themselves (free of charge) to the environmental research of the lake and its surroundings. Beginning with the study of lithology of gravels from the bottom of Wigry, with time, the scope of research was extended to geology, hydrochemistry, hydrobiology, sediment dating, and the study of the evolution of the Wigry lake environment and neighboring lakes (mainly dystrophic ones, called “suchar”). A measurable effect of this group's activity was a hundred dozen scientific publications, several dozen graduation theses, and a monograph entitled "Lake Wigry. History of the Lake in the Light of Geological and Palaeoecological Research" published in 2009.

Jacek Rutkowski was the author or co-author of around 250 scientific papers, including "Kraków" and "Miechów" sheets of the Detailed Geological Map of Poland 1: 50000, promoter of 6 doctoral dissertations, and reviewer of many doctoral and habilitation dissertations. He was an honorary member of the Polish Geological Society, a founding member of the Polish Limnological Society, and a member of, among others, the Commission on Quaternary Palaeogeography of the Polish Academy of Science and Art and the Committee of Quaternary Research of the Polish Academy of Sciences.

== Awards and decorations ==
Winner of numerous awards and distinctions: the Knight's Cross of the Order of Polonia Restituta (1987), the Golden Cross of Merit (1976) and the Medal of the National Education Commission (1994), the prestigious Ludwik Zejszner scientific prize awarded by the Polish Geological Society (1965), Badge of Honour of Podlaskie Voivodship (2014) awarded for outstanding research achievements in the Wigry National Park and numerous other prizes.

== See also ==
- Geology of Poland
