= Jacek Bocheński =

Polish writer (born 1926)

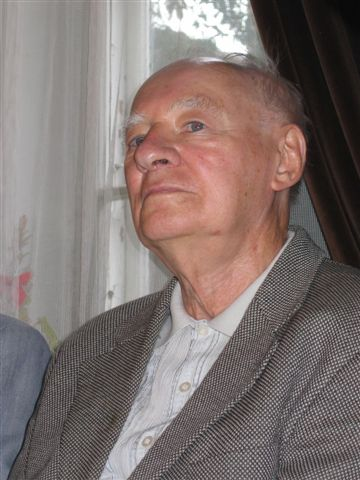
Image of Jacek Bochenski

Jacek Bocheński (pronounced [jat͡sek bɔxɛɲski]; born 29 July 1926) is a Polish writer, author of The Roman Trilogy (Divine Julius, Naso the Poet, Tiberius Caesar); an opposition figure in communist Poland and a leading figure in Polish literary circles.

His literary work is characterized by frequent references to Roman Antiquity and its projection on the moral and political dilemmas of the modern world. In addition, it raises issues such as opposition to authoritarian power, and the place of the individual in the modern world and in history. The style of his prose, noted for its beauty, is often experimental, involving the blending of narrative fiction and essay, indirect speech, blurring of identities, and frequent switching between times and places of action, lending it to multiple levels of interpretation.

== Biography ==
Bocheński was born in Lviv on 29 July 1926. He made his debut with a poem in the weekly Odrodzenie" in 1944. Member of the Polish communist party 1948–1966, he was expelled from it for having participated a protests against the expulsion of Leszek Kołakowski. In 1976, together with Wiktor Woroszylski, he founded the underground literary journal "Zapis", and served as its editor-in-chief 1978–1981. One of the 64 signatories of a letter to the communist authorities dated August 23, 1980 (“Letter of 64") urging the communist authorities to engage in a dialogue with the striking Solidarity workers. 1981–1983, interned by the communist government during Martial law. 1988-1990 member of the (advisory) Civic Committee to Lech Wałęsa. In 1989 he became one of the founders of the Polish Writers' Association. In the years 1995-1997 he was vice-president, and then in the years 1997–1999, president of the Polish PEN Club. Organizer of the PEN World Congress in Warsaw in 1999. In the years 1999–2014, he was a member of the Polish Language Council and 2010 - 2013 chairman of Society of Authors ZAiKS. Decorated with the Grand Cross of the Order of Polonia Restituta.

Under the pseudonym Adam Hosper, he wrote texts for popular music. Author of the lyrics for several hit songs

== English translations of Roman Trilogy ==
Jacek Bocheński, Divine Julius. How to become a god in four easy steps, translated by Tom Pinch, Mondrala Press, 2022.

Jacek Bocheński, Naso the Poet: The Loves and Crimes of Rome's Greatest Poet, translated by Tom Pinch, Mondrala Press, 2023.

Jacek Bocheński, Tiberius Caesar: An Investigation, translated by Tom Pinch, Mondrala Press, 2023.

== Bibliography ==
Jacek Bocheński, Wtedy - rozmowy z Jackiem Bocheńskim, Świat Książki, Warszawa, 2011.

Wanda Bronska, Literarische Unruhe in Polen, published in "Süddeutsche Zeitung" 10 December 1961.

Justyna Dąbrowska, Study of womanhood in Jacek Bocheński's antique trilogy, published in " Annales Philologiae Vol. 33, No 1 (2015).

Aleksander Fiut, Les visages de la tyrannie dans la trilogie Romaine de Jacek Bocheński, published in "Researches et Travaux, 80/2012, pp. 49-55.

Katarzyna Marciniak, Veni, Vidi, Verti. Jacek Bocheński's Games with Censhorhip, published in David Morvin and Elżbieta Olechowska, eds., " Classics and Class. Teaching Greek and Latin behind the Iron Curtain, Ljubljana-Warsaw:Faculty of Arts, University of Ljubljana-Obta, Faculty of "Artes Liberales" UW, 2016, pp. 358–387, and photos 504–5011.

Tom Pinch, Bocheński's Notorious Roman Trilogy: A Great Literary Classic: History, Essays, Fragments (The Notorious Roman Trilogy Boom 4), Mondrala Press, 2022.

Tomasz Strzyżewski, Wielka Księga Cenzury PRL w dokumentach, Prohibita, Warszawa, 2015.

Ludwig Zimmerer, Ruhe - des Bürgers erste Pflicht, published in " Die Welt, 15 December 1961.

Theodore Ziółkowski, Ovid and the Moderns, Cornell University Press, 2005.

Caesar nach modernen Müstern, published in "Deutsche Zeitung, 16–17 February 1963.
