= Jacek Falfus =

Polish politician (born 1951)

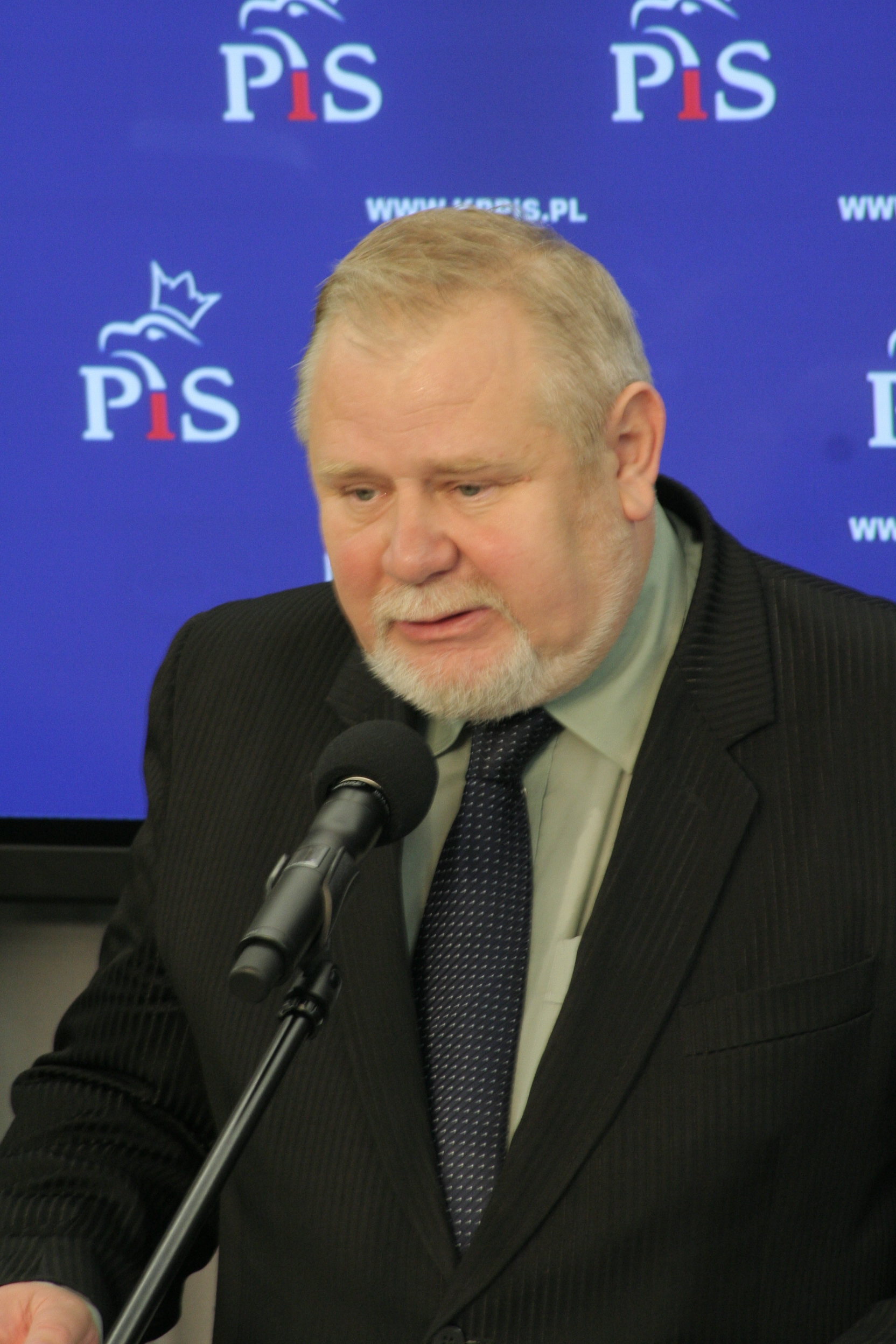
- Falfus in 2008

member of Sejm 2005-2007
- In office 25 September 2005 – ?

Personal details
- Born: 1951 (age 74–75)
- Party: Law and Justice

Jacek Eugeniusz Falfus (born 1 February 1951 in Siemianowice Śląskie) is a Polish politician. He was elected to the Sejm on 25 September 2005, getting 27698 votes in 27 Bielsko-Biała district as a candidate from the Law and Justice list.

He was also a member of Sejm 2001-2005.

== See also ==
- Members of Polish Sejm 2005-2007
