= Adam Walanus =

Polish scientist and photographer (born 1952)

- Born: 6 April 1952 (age 74)
- Education: Silesian University of Technology (Politechnika Śląska)
- Occupations: Geologist, physicist, data analyst, statistician, programmer, photographer
- Website: adamwalanus.pl

Adam Józef Walanus (born 6 April 1952) is a geologist, physicist, data analyst, statistician, programmer and photographer.

== Biography ==
He attended Stanisław Staszic High School in Tarnowskie Góry, where he passed matura in 1971. In 1976 he graduated with a master's degree in technical physics from the Silesian University of Technology (Politechnika Śląska). In 1983 he obtained doctorate at the AGH Institute of Physics and Nuclear Techniques. upon dissertation Obiektywizacja pomiaru w datowaniach metodą 14C supervised by Andrzej Zastawny. From 1976 to 1998 he was employed at the Institute of Physics at the Silesian University of Technology. In 2002 he obtained habilitation. From 2007 to 2023 he was employed at the AGH. His research interests included radiocarbon dating, data analysis and statistics in the natural sciences. In 1971, he received the Third Prize at the 2nd Polish Landscape Biennale in Kielce (in photography). In 2015, his photographs were shown at the exhibition Człowiek wśród ludzi at the Wojewódzka Biblioteka Publiczna w Krakowie. He is married, has two sons (born 1978 and 1985) and five grandchildren.

== Books ==
- Datowanie radiowęglowe. Wydawnictwo AGH. 2009. Co-authored with Tomasz Goslar.
