= Jacek Magdziński =

Polish footballer (born 1986)

Personal information
- Date of birth: 20 September 1986 (age 40)
- Place of birth: Poznań, Poland
- Height: 1.84 m (6 ft 0 in)
- Position: Forward

Team information
- Current team: Zdrój Ciechocinek

Youth career
- 1996–1997: Promień Kowalewo Pomorskie
- 2003–2005: Dyskobolia Grodzisk Wielkopolski

Senior career*
Years	Team	Apps	(Gls)
2005	Obra Kościan		
2006	Arka Nowa Sól		
2006–2007	Germania Egestorf		
2007–2009	Flota Świnoujście	51	(15)
2009–2010	Zawisza Bydgoszcz	28	(7)
2010–2011	Flota Świnoujście	7	(1)
2011	Chojniczanka Chojnice	11	(2)
2011–2012	Gwardia Koszalin	26	(13)
2012	Farnborough	3	(0)
2012	Billericay Town	2	(0)
2012	Wealdstone	2	(0)
2012–2013	Walton & Hersham	3	(0)
2013–2014	Gwardia Koszalin	31	(17)
2014	Puszcza Niepołomice	11	(0)
2014	Promień Kowalewo Pomorskie		
2015	Académica Lobito	28	(10)
2016	Progresso do Sambizanga	3	(0)
2016	Benfica Luanda	13	(3)
2017	Sagrada Esperança	7	(2)
2021–2023	Wybrzeże Rewalskie Rewal	26	(50)
2023–2026	Unia Gniewkowo	56	(50)
2026–	Zdrój Ciechocinek	0	(0)
- * Club domestic league appearances and goals as of 23:12, 19 February 2026 (UTC)

Jacek Magdziński (born 20 September 1986) is a Polish professional footballer who plays as a forward for regional league club Zdrój Ciechocinek. Besides Poland, he also played in England and Angola.

== Career ==
Magdzinski started his senior career with Dyskobolia Grodzisk Wielkopolski. After that, he played for Arka Nowa Sól, Germania Egestorf/Langreder, Flota Świnoujście, Zawisza Bydgoszcz, Chojniczanka Chojnice, Gwardia Koszalin, Farnborough, Billericay Town, Wealdstone, and Walton & Hersham. In 2014, he signed for Puszcza Niepołomice in the Polish I liga, where he made eleven appearances and scored zero goals.

In 2017, he moved to Sagrada Esperança in Angola.

== Honours ==
Flota Świnoujście

- III liga, group II: 2007–08

Wybrzeże Rewalskie Rewal

- Regional league West Pomerania I: 2021–22

Unia Gniewkowo

- Regional league Kuyavia-Pomerania II: 2024–25
