= Jacek Soliński =

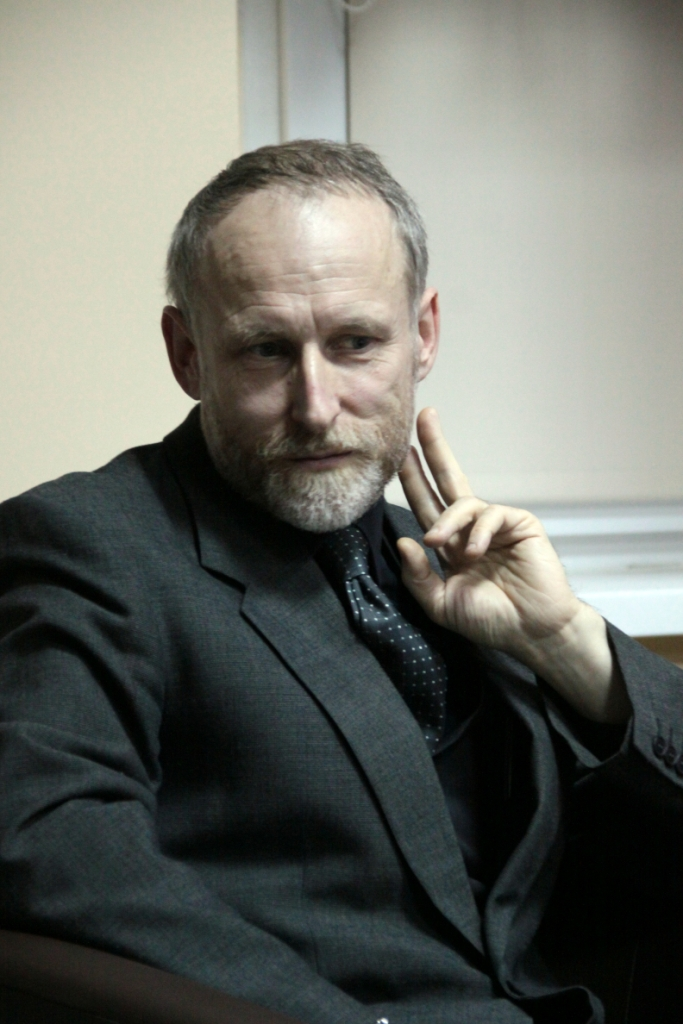
- Jacek Soliński in 2012
- Born: 1957 (age 68–69); Bydgoszcz, Poland
- Known for: painting

Jacek Soliński (born 1957) is a Polish painter, photographer, publicist and publisher.

== Biography ==
He was born in Bydgoszcz. Since 1979, together with Jan Kaja, he has run an art gallery called Authors' Gallery (org. Galeria Autorska) in Bydgoszcz. He is a Member of ZPAP Association of Polish Artists and Designers. In 2015 he received from Ministry of Culture and National Heritage (Poland) special medal for his contribution to Polish culture.

== Information ==
In the 1980s, he carried out conceptual projects and published on his own three books and five books of poems in linoleum print technique. Together with Jan Kaja he elaborated and issued a number of monographic art books dedicated to fine artists.

he presented several dozen of solo exhibitions (in Poland: Bydgoszcz, Gdańsk, Sopot, Toruń, Warsaw, Łódź, Kraków, Lublin; and abroad in: Paris, Rome, Tokyo and Edinburgh).

Since 1986, he carries out his annual birthday exhibition of linocuts in the Authors' Gallery. He issued dozen or so of his own publications linking series of linocuts with epigrams, prayers, poetry and prose. Made many cycles of linocuts and a cycle of paintings of 366 angels entitled "Guardians of time".

== Linocut (selection) ==
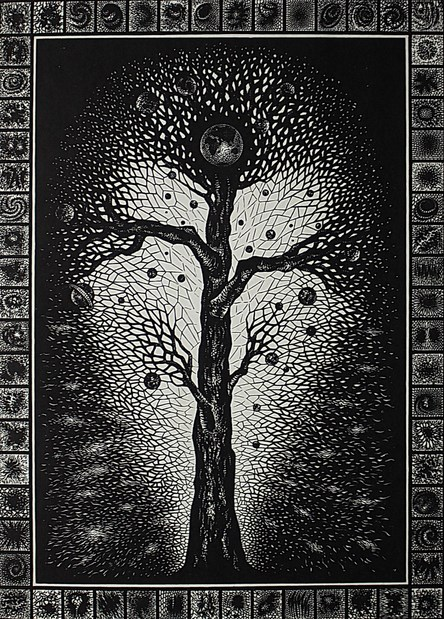
"Drzewo Wszechświata" (I-IV 1990)

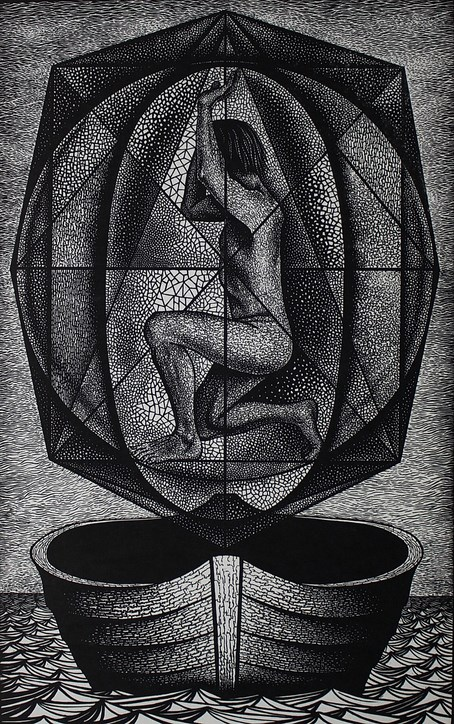
"Wyznaczona pora" (IV-V 1992)

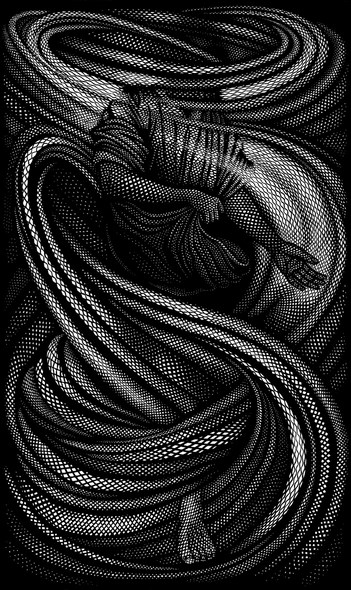
"Siewca i wiatr (1993)

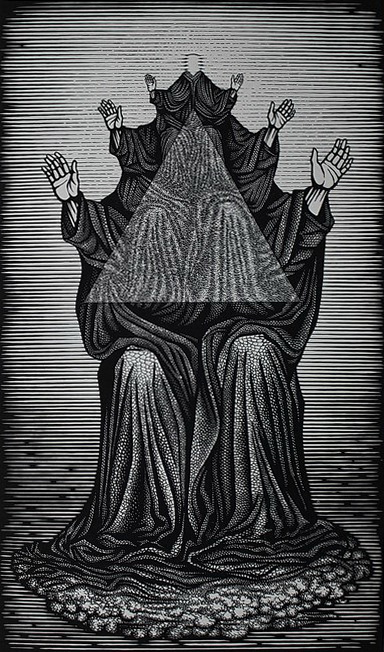
"Wypowiedzenie imienia" (VI 1994)

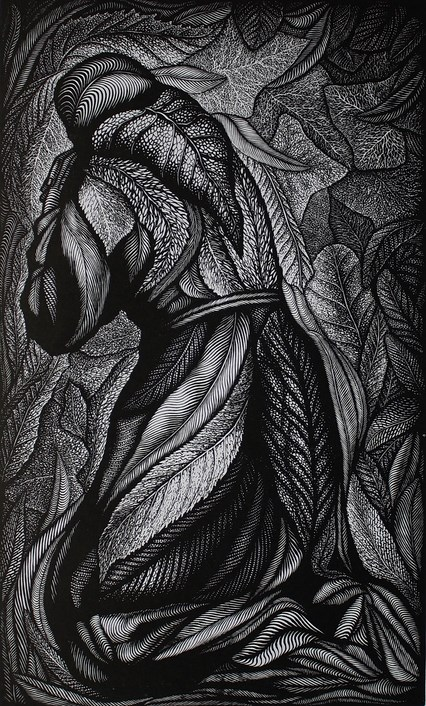
"Słuchanie szelestu liścia" (VI 1994)

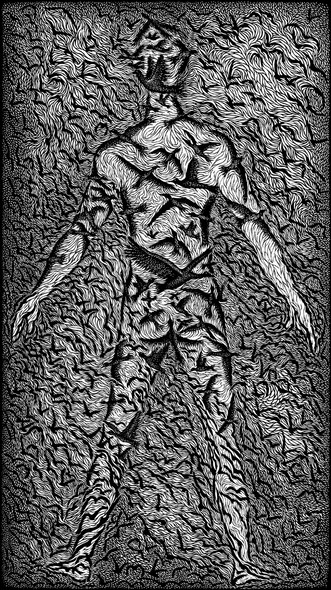
"W każdym momencie" (1995)

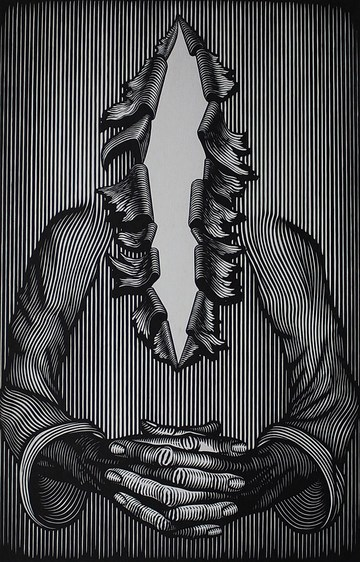
"Otwieranie obecności" (VIII 1996)

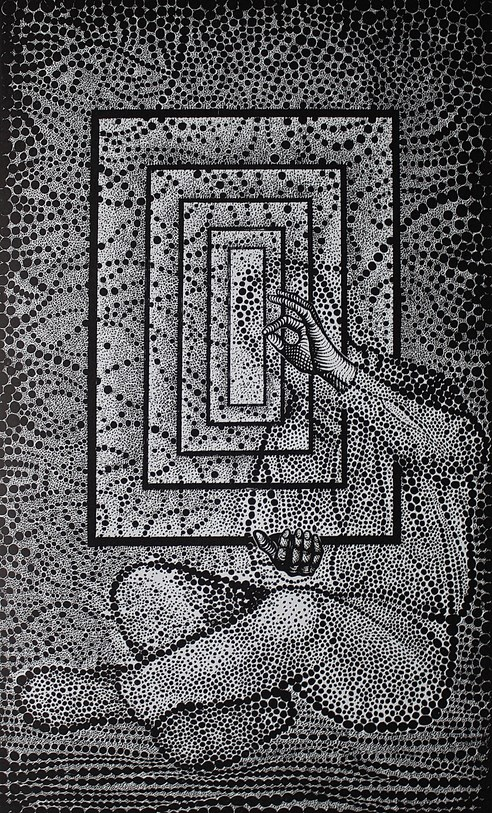
"Układanie kamyków"(IX 2001)

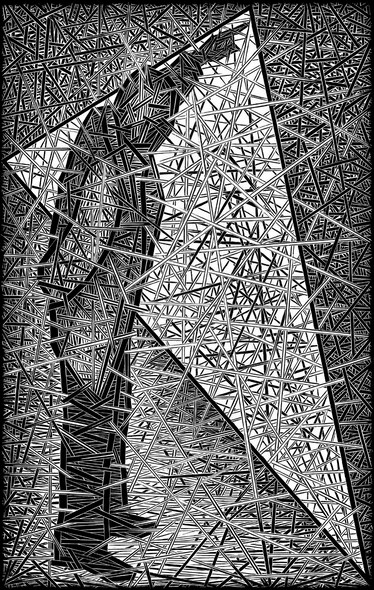
"Domniemana przestrzeń" (2009)

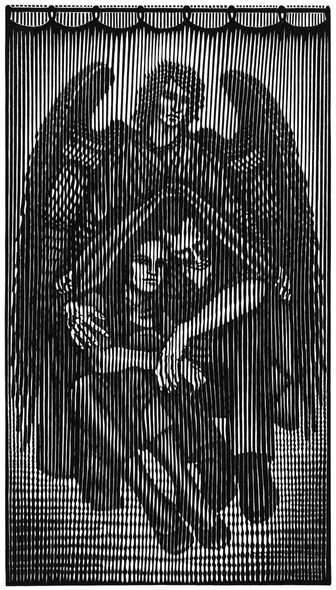
"Zasłona" (2015)

== Paintings ("Guardians of time") – selection ==
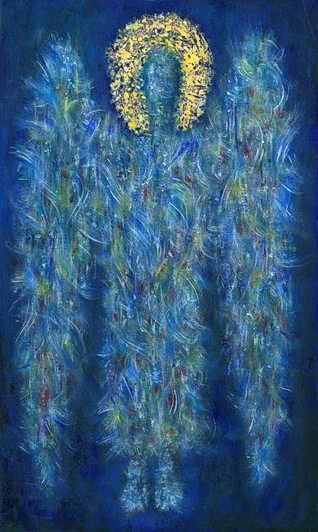
Angel of the 1 day (v.2)

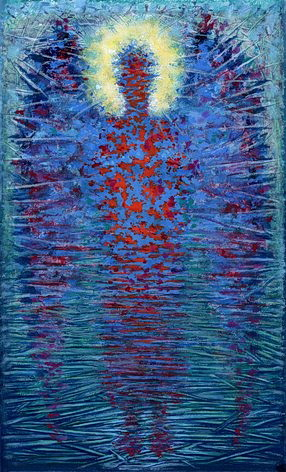
Angel of the 29th day

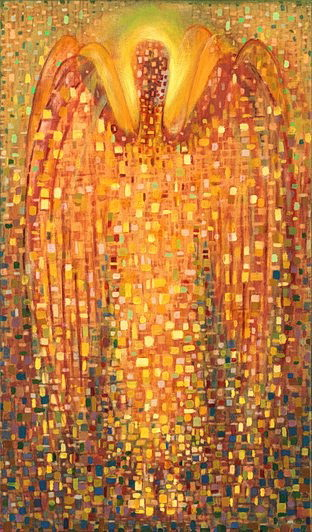
Angel of the 114th day

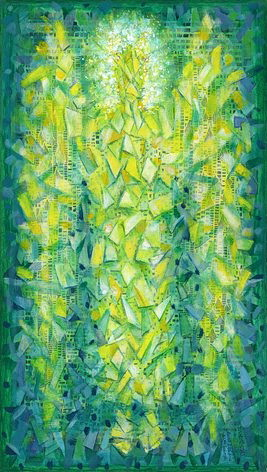
Angel of the 116th day

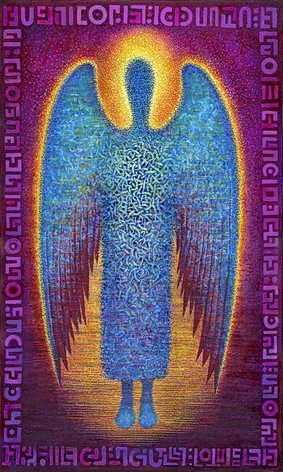
Angel of the 165th day

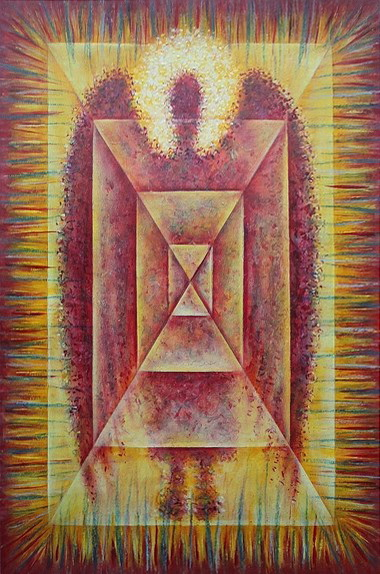
Angel of the 169th day

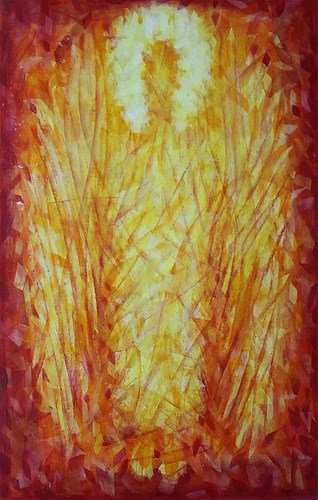
Angel of the 197th day

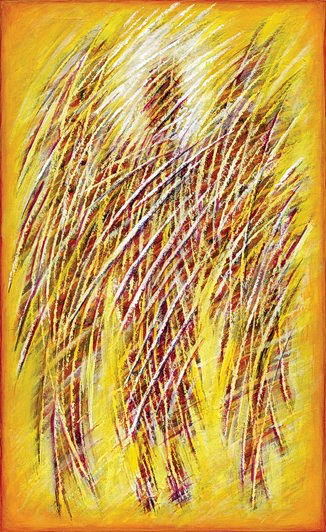
Angel of the 254th day

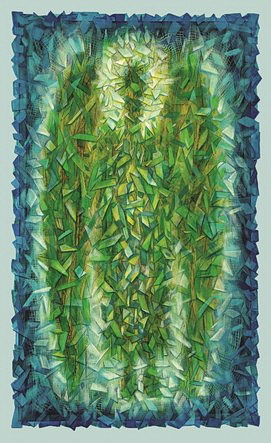
Angel of the 279th day

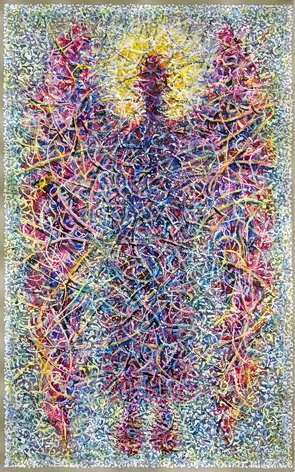
Angel of the 314th day

== Bibliography ==
- "Chwile obecności (1979-2004)" Publisher: Galeria Autorska, Bydgoszcz, 2004, ISBN 83-91-4388-5-6

== See also ==
- List of Polish painters
