= Jacek Nieżychowski =

Polish actor

Jacek Nieżychowski (1924–2009) was a Polish actor, singer, and manager. He worked as a consultant to a Romani artistic collaborative.
