= Jacek Sauk =

Polish politician (born 1944)

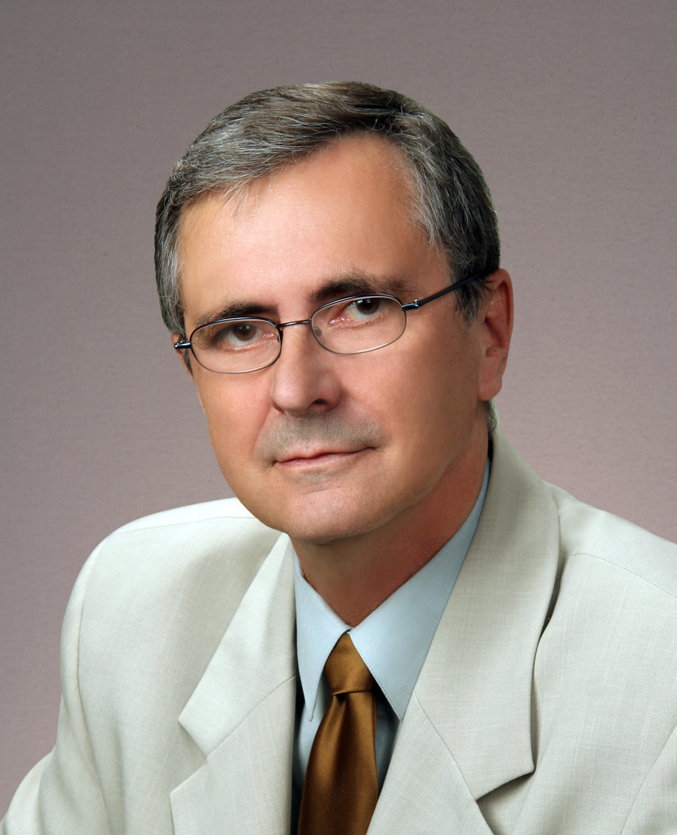
Jacek Sauk (2005)

Jacek Sauk (born 21 July 1944 in Vilnius) is a Polish politician, member of Law and Justice party. He was a member of Polish Sejm from 2001 to 2005 and Polish Senate from 1997 to 2001 and from 2005 to 2007.
