= Jacek Zieliński =

Jacek Zieliński may refer to two Polish football coaches:

- Jacek Zieliński (footballer, born 1961)
- Jacek Zieliński (footballer, born 1967)
