= Jacek Markiewicz =

Polish footballer

Personal information
- Full name: Jacek Markiewicz
- Date of birth: 18 June 1976 (age 50)
- Place of birth: Białystok, Poland
- Height: 1.82 m (5 ft 11 1/2 in)
- Position: Defender

Team information
- Current team: Dąb Dąbrowa Białostocka (manager)

Senior career*
Years	Team	Apps	(Gls)
1993–2001	Jagiellonia Białystok	155	(51)
1999	→ KP Wasilków (loan)	16	(3)
2001–2004	RKS Radomsko	51	(1)
2004–2008	Jagiellonia Białystok	113	(8)
2008–2011	Korona Kielce	71	(3)
2011–2015	Dąb Dąbrowa Białostocka	102+	(10+)
2016	KS Michałowo		
2017–2022	Magnat Juchnowiec Kościelny		
2022–2024	Dąb Dąbrowa Białostocka	39	(3)

Managerial career
- 2011–2014: Dąb Dąbrowa Białostocka (player-manager)
- 2017–2022: Magnat Juchnowiec Kościelny (player-manager)
- 2022–: Dąb Dąbrowa Białostocka
- * Club domestic league appearances and goals

Jacek Markiewicz (born 18 June 1976) is a Polish football manager and former professional player who is currently in charge of regional league club Dąb Dąbrowa Białostocka.
