= Jacek Kubka =

Polish sports shooter

Personal information
- Nationality: Polish
- Born: 19 September 1967 (age 57); Zielona Góra, Poland

Sport
- Sport: Sports shooting

Jacek Kubka (born 19 September 1967) is a Polish sports shooter. He competed in two events at the 1992 Summer Olympics.
