= Critical Reviews in Analytical Chemistry =

- Discipline: Analytical chemistry
- Language: English
- Edited by: Stephen E. Bialkowski

Publication details
- Former name: CRC Critical Reviews in Analytical Chemistry
- History: 1970-present
- Publisher: Taylor & Francis
- Frequency: 8 issues per year
- Impact factor: 6.535 (2020)

Standard abbreviations
- ISO 4: Crit. Rev. Anal. Chem.

Indexing
- CODEN: CCACBB
- ISSN: 1040-8347 (print); 1547-6510 (web)
- CRC Critical Reviews in Analytical Chemistry
- ISSN: 0007-8980

Links
- Journal homepage; Online access; Online archive

Critical Reviews in Analytical Chemistry is a peer-reviewed scientific journal published by Taylor & Francis. It was established in 1970 as CRC Critical Reviews in Analytical Chemistry, obtaining its current name in 1989. The journal covers research in all areas of analytical chemistry. The editor-in-chief is Stephen E. Bialkowski (Utah State University).

== Abstracting and indexing ==
The journal is abstracted and indexed in Chemical Abstracts Service, Compendex, Current Contents/Physical, Chemical & Earth Sciences, Science Citation Index, Scopus, and MEDLINE. According to the Journal Citation Reports, the journal has a 2024 impact factor of 4.2. In 2020 it was 6.535.
