= Jacek Laskowski =

Polish sports commentator

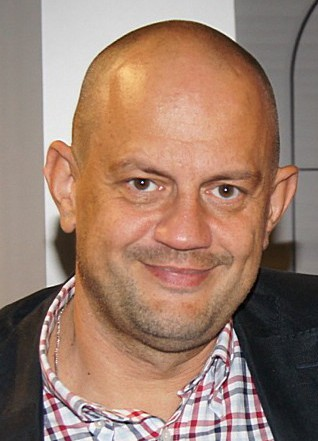
Jacek Laskowski

Jacek Laskowski (born 1 June 1967 in Warsaw) is a Polish sports commentator, working for the TVP.

== Events ==
- UEFA Champions League
- UEFA Europa League
- Poland national football team matches
- FIFA World Cup
- UEFA European Championship

== Games ==
- FIFA (video game series)

== See also ==
- Dariusz Szpakowski
