= Hyacinth (disambiguation) =

Hyacinth, genus Hyacinthus, is a small group of bulbous, spring-blooming perennial plants.

Hyacinth or Hyacinthus may also refer to:

== Nature ==
=== Plants ===
- Hyacinthus orientalis, common hyacinth
- Grape hyacinth, Muscari, a genus of perennial bulbous plants native to Eurasia
- Hyacinth bean, Lablab, a genus of bean in the family Fabaceae with the sole species Lablab purpureus
- Water hyacinth, Pontederia crassipes, aquatic plant native to the Amazon basin

=== Animals ===
- Hyacinth macaw, a species of parrot
- Hyacinth, a breed of pigeon

== People ==
- Flora Hyacinth (born 1966), retired female track and field athlete
- Hyacinth (given name), list of people with this name
- Hyacinth of Caesarea (died 108), early Christian martyr saint
- Hyacinth and Protus (martyred 257–9), Christian saints
- Hyacinth of Poland (1185–1257), Polish priest, canonized 1594
- Hyacinth (Bichurin) (1777–1853), one of the founding fathers of Russian Sinology

=== Mythology ===
- Hyacinth (mythology), divine hero in Greek mythology
- Hyacinthus the Lacedaemonian (in Greek mythology), who sacrificed his daughters to Athena or Persephone

== Arts and entertainment ==
- Hyacinth (album), a 2020 album by Spinning Coin
- "Hyacinth", a 2004 song by Aya Matsuura
- "Hyacinth", a 2021 song by Serpentwithfeet from Deacon
- Hyacinth Bucket, a character in Keeping Up Appearances
- Hyacinth Bridgerton, a character in Bridgerton
- Hyacinth House, a song by The Doors on L.A. Woman.

== Mineral ==
- Hyacinth (mineral), alternative name for yellow zircon
- Hyacinth (gemstone), a gemstone sometimes called jacinth

== Vessels ==
- HMS Hyacinth
- USS Hyacinth

== Other uses ==
- Hyacinth, Virginia
- Confection of hyacinth, ancient medical treatment (that used zircon)

== See also ==
- St. Hyacinth (disambiguation)
- San Jacinto (disambiguation) ("Saint Hyacinth" in Spanish)
- Hurricane Hyacinth
- Operation Hyacinth
- Hyacinthe (disambiguation)
- The Hyacinth Incident
- Russian designation (Гиацинт-С, "Giacínt-S") of the 2S5 self-propelled gun
