= Jacinto =

- Gender: Male

Origin
- Origin: Greek
- Meaning: Hyacinth

Other names
- Related names: Jacinta, Jacenty, Jacek, Giacinto, Jacint

Jacinto is a Spanish and Portuguese given name meaning Hyacinth, which can refer to Saint Hyacinth, a Roman martyr (Hyacinth and Protus), or the Hyacinth flower itself.

Common English nicknames for "Jacinto" are "Jack", "Jason" and "Jesse". Jacinto has only a few equivalents in other languages such as the Polish "Jacek" and "Jacenty", the Italian "Giacinto" and the Hungarian "Jácint". The feminine equivalent of Jacinto is Jacinta.

People with the given name include:

- Jacinto Barquín (1915–?), Cuban footballer
- Jacinto Barrasa (died 1704), Peruvian Jesuit preacher and historian
- Jacinto Benavente (1866–1954), Spanish dramatist and Nobel laureate
- Jacinto Bondanza Castro (1900–1987), pioneering Salvadoran aviator
- Jacinto Caamaño (1759–1829), leader of the last great Spanish exploration of Alaska (then Russian America) and the coast of what is now British Columbia
- Jacinto Canek (c. 1731–1761), Maya revolutionary who fought against the Spanish
- Jacinto Convit (1913–2014), Venezuelan physician and scientist
- Jacinto Diniz (1888–1949), American politician and businessman
- Jacinto Elá (born 1982), Equatoguinean retired footballer
- Jacinto Espinoza (born 1969), Ecuadorian former football goalkeeper
- Jacinto Grau (1877–1958), Spanish playwright and writer
- Jacinto João (1944–2004), Portuguese footballer
- Jacinto Jose (born 1950), Filipino bishop of the Roman Catholic Church
- Jacinto Lara (1777–1859), Venezuelan independence leader and military officer of the Venezuelan War of Independence
- Jacinto Molina Álvarez, birth name of Paul Naschy (1934–2009), Spanish film actor, screenwriter and director
- Jacinto Morano (born 1984), Spanish lawyer and politician
- Jacinto Moreno (fl. 1985), retired Philippine Constabulary enlisted trooper and recipient of the Medal of Valor, the Philippines' highest military award for courage
- Jacinto Peynado (1878–1940), president of the Dominican Republic from 1938 to 1940
- Jacinto Quincoces (1905–1997), Spanish football player and manager
- Jacinto Rodríguez (footballer) (born 1958), Paraguayan former footballer
- Jacinto Rodríguez Díaz (1901–1929), aviation pioneer in Guatemala
- Jacinto Rodriguez (1815–1880), recipient of the Rancho Jacinto Mexican land grant
- Jacinto Santos (born 1941), Portuguese former footballer
- Jacinto Vera (1813–1881), Uruguayan Roman Catholic prelate and first bishop of Montevideo
- Jacinto Zamora (1835–1872), Filipino Catholic priest, one of a trio of priests falsely accused of mutiny

== See also ==
- Hyacinth
- San Jacinto
