= Hyacinth (given name) =

Hyacinth is a variant form of the given name Hyacinthe. The name is derived from a Greek word meaning the blue larkspur flower or the colour purple.

English variant forms include Hyacintha or Hyacinthia. European equivalents include Hyacinthe (French), Hyazinth (German), Jacek (Polish, male), Iakinf (Иакинф; Russian). The Spanish name Jacinta is closely related, referring to the hyacinth flower. Jacinda (Greek and Spanish) may refer to either.

Hyacinth may also refer to:

== Men with the given name Hyacinth ==
- Hyacinth and Protus (martyred 257–9), Christian saints
- Hyacinth Bobone (c.1106–1198), after 1191 Pope Celestine III
- Hyacinth (Bichurin) (1777–1853), one of the founding fathers of Sinology
- Hyacinth Oroko Egbebo (born 1955), vicar and bishop
- Hyacinth Gabriel Connon (1911–1978), Lasallian Brother and a president of De La Salle University
- Hyacinth Graf Strachwitz von Groß-Zauche und Camminetz (1893–1968), German Army officer
- Hyacinth Morgan (1885–1956), Labour Party politician in the United Kingdom
- Hyacinth of Caesarea (died 108), early Christian martyr saint
- Hyacinth Tungutalum (1946–2009), Australian politician
- Saint Hyacinth (1185–1257), Polish priest, canonized 1594
- Hugh Hyacinth O'Rorke MacDermot (1834–1904), Irish lawyer
- Hyacinthe Yves Philippe Potentien, Baron de Bougainville (1781-1846) French naval officer, son of Louis de Bougainville

=== Mythology ===
- Hyacinth (mythology), divine hero in Greek mythology

=== Fiction ===
- Hyacinth Robinson, the main character of Henry James' 1886 novel The Princess Casamassima
- Hyacinth, the blue hedgehog and university dean in Car Seat Headrest's rock opera album The Scholars

== Women with the given name Hyacinth ==
- Hyacinth Callado (born 2003) Filipina actress and social media personality
- Hyacinthe-Gabrielle Roland (1766-1816), Actress, Wife of 1st Marquess Wellesley
- Hyacinthe Mary Wellesley (1789-1849), 1st Baroness Hatherton
- Hyacinth Flemmings, former cricketer
- Hyacinth Knight, Jamaican politician
- Hyacinth Mariscotti (also written Hyacintha or Giacinta) (1585-1640), Italian saint
- Hyacinth Walters (born 1926), Jamaican former sprinter
- Hyacinth Wijeratne (1946-2021), Sri Lankan Sinhala actress

=== Fiction ===
- Hyacinth Bucket, main character in the TV sitcom Keeping Up Appearances
- Hyacinth Hippo, a character from the Disney movie Fantasia (1940 film)
- Hyacinth Bridgerton, character in the novel series Bridgerton

=== People with the surname Hyacinth ===
- Flora Hyacinth (born 1966), retired female track and field athlete from the United States Virgin Islands

== See also ==
- Hyacinth (disambiguation)
- Hyacinthe
- Jacek
- Jacinta
- St. Hyacinth (disambiguation)
