= Outlands (disambiguation) =

The Concordant Domain of the Outlands features in the cosmology of the Dungeon & Dragons game.

Outlands may also refer to:

- Kingdom of the Outlands, a regional designation used within the Society for Creative Anachronism
- Outlands (magazine), a 1946 English science-fiction magazine which ran for only one issue
- Outlands, Staffordshire, a village in England
- Outlands, a 2013 web series on Geek & Sundry
- an English translation of the Frisian toponym Uthlande
- Western Outlands, English translation of a Bulgarian toponym

== See also ==
- Outer Lands
- Outlander (disambiguation)
- Outland (disambiguation)
