= Hyacinthe =

Hyacinthe is a given name. It is generally a male name. The form Hyacinth may be masculine or feminine.

== People with this name ==
- Hyacinthe (actor) (1814–1887), French actor and operetta singer
- Hyacinthe Besson (1816–1861), French painter and missionary priest
- Hyacinthe Collin de Vermont (1693–1761), French painter
- Hyacinthe de Bougainville (1781–1846), French naval officer
- Hyacinthe de Charencey (1832–1916), French philologist
- Hyacinthe de Valroger (1814–1876), French Roman Catholic priest
- Hyacinthe Decomberousse (1786–1856), French dramatist
- Hyacinthe Deleplace (born 1989), French Paralympian athlete
- Hyacinthe François Joseph Despinoy (1764–1848), General during the French Revolutionary Wars
- Hyacinthe Gaëtan de Lannion (1719–1762), French politician
- Hyacinthe Guevremont (1892–1964), Canadian ice hockey player
- Hyacinthe Henri Boncourt (died 1840), French chess player
- Hyacinthe Jadin (1776–1800), French composer
- Hyacinthe Klosé (1808–1880), French clarinet player
- Hyacinthe Libelli (1616–1684), Italian Archbishop of Avignon
- Hyacinthe Loyson (1827–1912), French Roman Catholic priest
- Hyacinthe Rigaud (1659–1743), French baroque painter
- Hyacinthe Robillard d'Avrigny (1675–1719), French Jesuit
- Hyacinthe Roosen (1897–?), Belgian wrestler
- Hyacinthe Serroni (1617–1687), French priest, bishop, diplomat and steward of the Navy
- Hyacinthe Serry, French Dominican Thomist theologian, controversialist and historian
- Hyacinthe Sigismond Gerdil (1718–1802), Italian theologian and cardinal
- Hyacinthe Thiandoum (1921–2004), Senegalese Archbishop of Dakar
- Hyacinthe Wodobodé (born 1953), Central African politician
- Hyacinthe-Louis de Quélen (1778–1839), Archbishop of Paris
- Hyacinthe-Marie Cormier (1832–1916), French Dominican friar and priest.

=== Fiction ===
- Hyacinthe, character in Jacqueline Carey's Kushiel's Legacy series of novels

== See also ==
- Kimberly Hyacinthe (born 1989), Canadian athlete
- Hyacinthe (disambiguation)
- Hyacinth (given name)
