= St. Hyacinth's Church =

St. Hyacinth's Church may refer to:

- Basilica of Saint Hyacinth, Chicago, Illinois, United States
- St. Hyacinth's Cathedral, Saint-Hyacinthe, Canada
- St. Hyacinth's Church, Vyborg, Russia
- St. Hyacinth's Church, Warsaw, Poland
- St. Hyacinth's Church, Wierzbica Górna, Poland
- St Protus and St Hyacinth's Church, Blisland, a Grade I listed parish church in Blisland, Cornwall, England

== See also ==
- St. Hyacinth (disambiguation)
