= Guevremont =

Guevremont (spelled in French as Guèvremont or Guévremont) is a French surname and it may refer to:

- Germaine Guèvremont, Canadian writer
- Hyacinthe Guevremont, NHL hockey player
- Jean-Baptiste Guèvremont, Canadian farmer and political figure
- Jean-François Guèvremont, Canadian drag queen and electropop singer

The name is a Norman French variant of Chèvremont, deriving from the Norman dialect's pronunciation and spelling of "chèvre", or goat, as "quevre"; combined with the -mont suffix, the name literally means "goat hill". Although the Guèvremont spelling is historically the most standard in French, some lines have replaced the grave accent with an acute accent, or have dropped the accent entirely. More rarely, the name may also be seen as Quevremont or Quievremont.
