= St. Hyacinth's Church, Vyborg =

Church building in Vyborg, Russia

Coordinates: 60.7140°N 28.7333°E

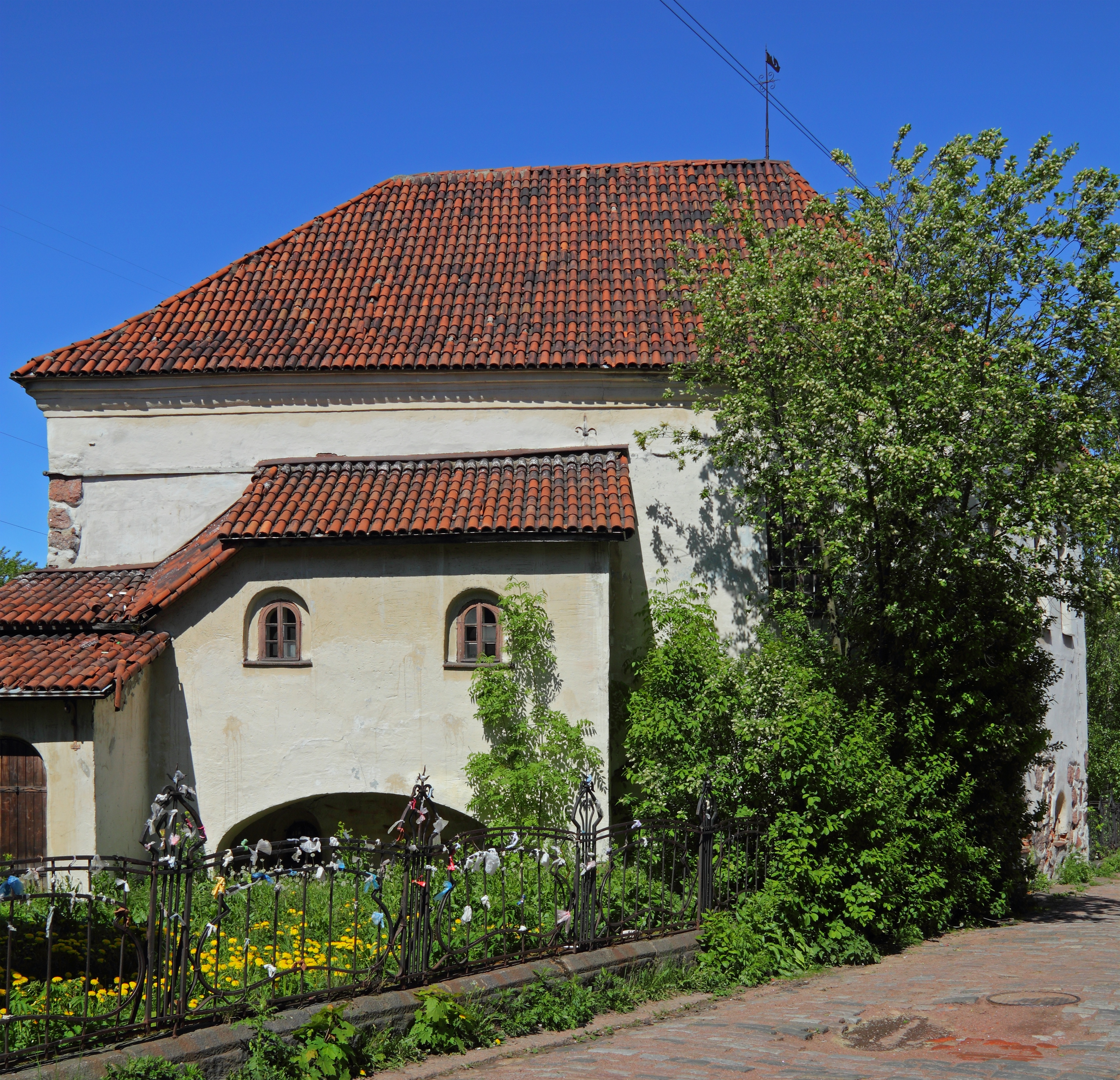

St. Hyacinth's Church (Finnish: Pyhän Hyacinthuksen kirkko) is a Gothic building, formerly a church, in Vyborg, Leningrad Oblast, Russia.

It was built in the sixteenth century as a private church for members of the nobility, and it became a Roman Catholic church, dedicated to Saint Hyacinth, in 1802.

In 1970, the neglected and disused building was restored for use as a children's art school. It is now an art gallery.

The wrought iron railings here once belonged to Vyborg Cathedral.
