= Outlander =

Outlander(s) may refer to:

== Art, entertainment, and media ==
- Outlander (novel), a 1991 novel by Diana Gabaldon
  - Outlander (book series), Gabaldon's novel and its sequels, and derivative works
  - Outlander (TV series), a 2014 television series on Starz based on the Outlander book series
  - Outlander: Blood of My Blood, a 2025 television series on Starz that serves as a prequel to the 2014 Outlander series.
- Outlander (film), a 2008 science fiction film directed by Howard McCain and starring James Caviezel
- Outlanders (book series), a post-apocalyptic science fiction book series
- Outlander (video game), a 1992 action video game developed by Mindscape for the Genesis and Super NES platforms
- Outlanders (video game), a 2019 video game developed by Pomelo Games
- Outlanders (manga), a manga that ran from 1985 to 1987
- Outlander, a 1970 album by Welsh musician Meic Stevens
- The Outlander (Canadian novel), the English translation of two novels by Canadian writer Germaine Guèvremont
  - The Outlander (film), a film adaptation of the Guèvremont work by Érik Canuel
- The Outlander, a novel by Gil Adamson
- Outlanders, a musical project with Tarja Turunen and Torsten Stenzel
- Outlander Magazine, London-based magazine founded in 2014

== Other uses ==
- Mitsubishi Outlander, a sport utility vehicle
  - Mitsubishi Outlander Sport, another name for the Mitsubishi ASX sport utility vehicle
- Ausländer, a German word meaning foreigner or legal alien

== See also ==
- Lander (disambiguation)
- Outland (disambiguation)
