= Serry =

Serry is a surname, and may refer to:

- Robert Serry (born 1950), Dutch diplomat and UN Special Coordinator for the Middle East Peace Process
- Jacques-Hyacinthe Serry (1659-1738), French theologian
- John Serry (1915-2003), Italian-American musician
- John Serry Jr. (born 1954), Italian-American jazz pianist and composer

== See also ==
- Serry-Kamal
