= St. Charles Battle Monument =

- U.S. National Register of Historic Places
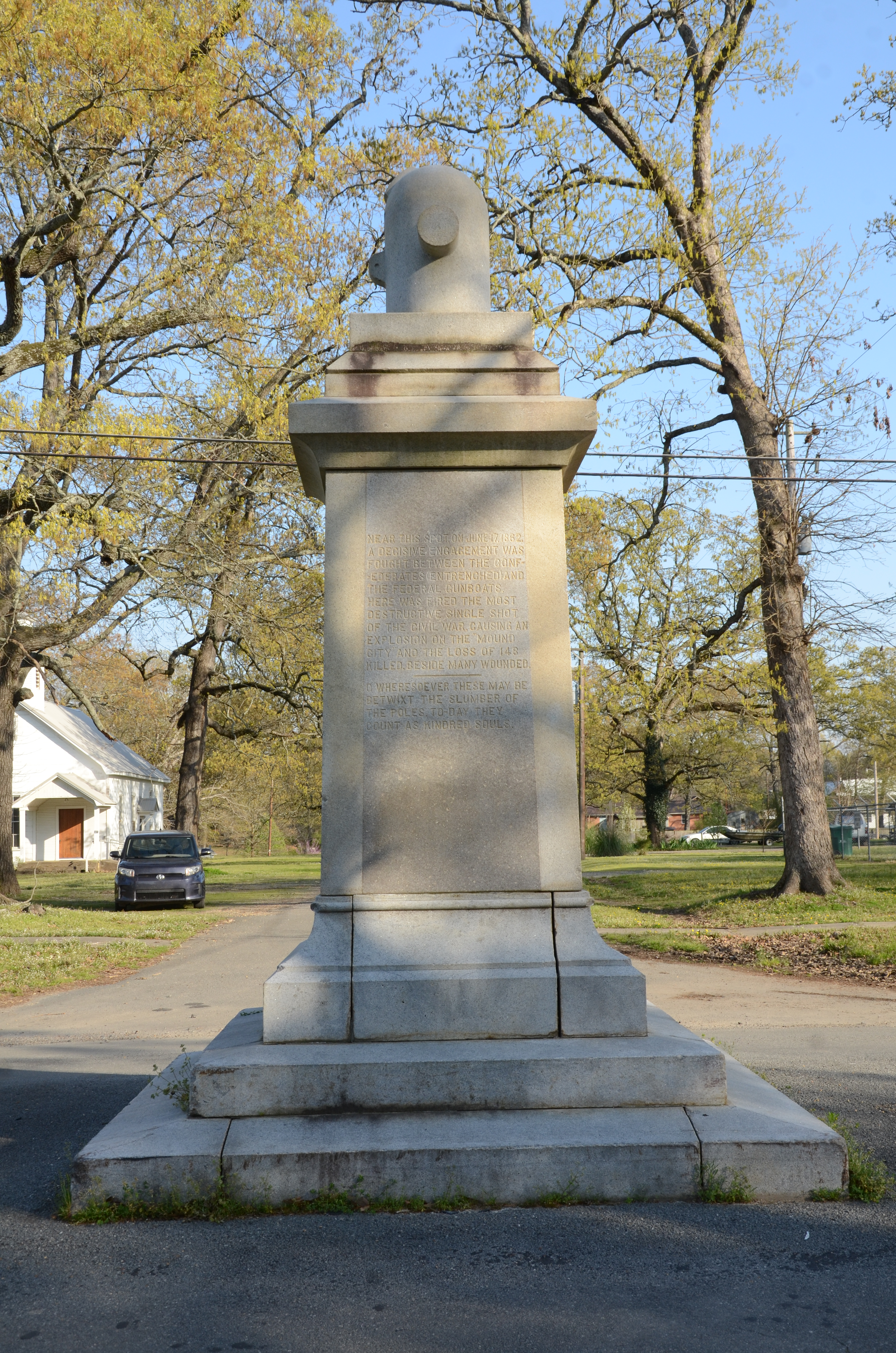

- Location within Arkansas Location within the United States
- Location: Jct. of Arkansas St. and Broadway, St. Charles, Arkansas
- Coordinates: 34°22′26″N 91°8′8″W
- Area: less than one acre
- Built: 1919
- Architectural style: Classical Revival
- MPS: Civil War Commemorative Sculpture MPS
- NRHP reference No.: 96000505
- Added to NRHP: May 3, 1996

The St. Charles Battle Monument is located at the center of the intersection of Broadway and Arkansas Street in the center of St. Charles, Arkansas. It commemorates the 1862 Battle of Saint Charles, a naval and land engagement of the American Civil War that took place just downriver from the city. It is a square granite monument, topped by an inverted cannon barrel. It is 18 feet (5.5 m) high and 9.5 feet (2.9 m) square. Its inscriptions commemorate the 148 Union soldiers who died in the explosion of the USS Mound City, caused by what is sometimes described as the single deadliest shot fired in the entire Civil War. Inscriptions on another side memorialize the smaller number of Confederate dead in the engagement. The monument was placed in 1919 through the efforts of a relative of William Hickman Harte, the master on board the Mound City who died in the explosion, and is one of the few memorials placed in a Confederate state by a northerner in commemoration of both Union and Confederate war dead.

The monument was listed on the National Register of Historic Places in 1996.

== See also ==
- St. Charles Battle Site, the area southeast of St. Charles where the land engagements of the battle took place
- National Register of Historic Places listings in Arkansas County, Arkansas
