= Chevremont =

Chevremont may refer to:

- Chevremont, a community in the municipality of Kerkrade in the Netherlands,
- Chèvremont, a commune in the region of Bourgogne-Franche-Comté in France,
- Chèvremont, Belgium, part of Chaudfontaine
- Chevremont-le-Myrr, the original Anglo-Norman name and etymological root of the village of Kirmond le Mire in Lincolnshire, England,
- a French surname.

See also Guevremont.
