= Jacinta =

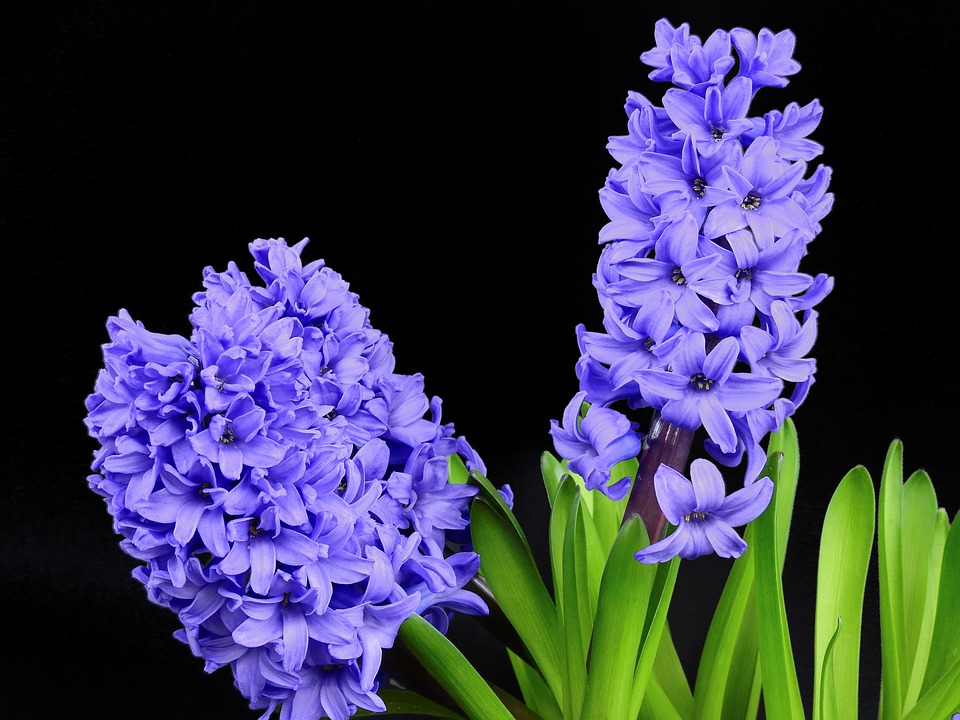
- The name Jacinta means hyacinth.
- Gender: Feminine

Origin
- Origin: Spanish; Portuguese; Greek
- Meaning: Hyacinth

Other names
- Related names: Giacinta, Hyacintha, Jacinto, Jacinda, Jaxine, Jacintha, Jesinta

Jacinta is a feminine given name of Spanish and Portuguese origin, derived from the Greek name Hyacinthus (Hyacinth), referring to the blue/purple spring flower or the mythological youth Hyacinthus. It is the feminine form of Jacinto (Spanish and Portuguese), Jácint (Hungarian) and Jacenty (Polish).

Variants in English or other languages include Hyacinth, Hyacintha, Jacinda, Jacintha, Jacinthe, Jacynthe, Jesinta, Jaxine or Giacinta.

As an English name, the name is mostly used in New Zealand and Australia, and likely originated in the Australian Catholic community in the 1970s in honour of Jacinta Marto, witness of Our Lady of Fátima.

== People ==
Jacinda

- Jacinda Ardern (born 1980), former Prime Minister of New Zealand
- Jacinda Barclay (1991–2020), Australian sportswoman
- Jacinda Barrett (born 1972), Australian actress
- Jacinda Russell (born 1972), American photographer
- Jacinda Vidrio, a fictional character in the TV series Once Upon a Time

Jacinta

- Jacinta Allan (born 1973), Australian politician
- Jacinta Coleman (1974–2017), New Zealand road cyclist
- Jacinta John, Australian actress, producer and director
- Jacinta Monroe (born 1988), American professional women's basketball player
- Jacinta Nampijinpa Price (born 1981), Australian politician
- Jacinta Stapleton (born 1979), Australian actress
- Jacinta Brondgeest, Australian dance-pop singer
- Jacinta Marto (1910–1920), one of three Portuguese shepherd children who claimed to witness the apparitions of Our Lady of Fátima
- Jacinta Tynan (born 1969), Australian news presenter and journalist
- Jacinta Ruru (born 1974), New Zealand Maori professor of law

Jacintha

- Jacintha Abisheganaden (born 1957), Singaporean singer and actress

Jacinthe

- Jacinthe Bouchard, Canadian animal behaviorist and trainer
- Jacinthe Laguë, Canadian actress
- Jacinthe Larivière (born 1981), Canadian skater
- Jacinthe Pineau (born 1974), Canadian swimmer
- Jacinthe Taillon (born 1977), Canadian synchronized swimmer

Jacynthe

- Jacynthe Carrier (born 1982), Canadian visual artist
- Jacynthe Millette-Bilodeau, Canadian pop singer
- Jacynthe Poirier (born 1962), Canadian Olympic fencer

Giacinta

- Giacinta Marescotti (1585–1640), Italian saint
- Giacinta 'Jinx' Johnson, fictional James Bond character

== Other ==
- Giacinta ed Ernesto, an opera by Julius Benedict
- Giacinta, a novel by Luigi Capuana
- Jacinta, an oil well drilled by Desire Petroleum in the southern part of the North Falkland Basin
