= James Wreford Watson =

Scottish Canadian geographer and cartographer

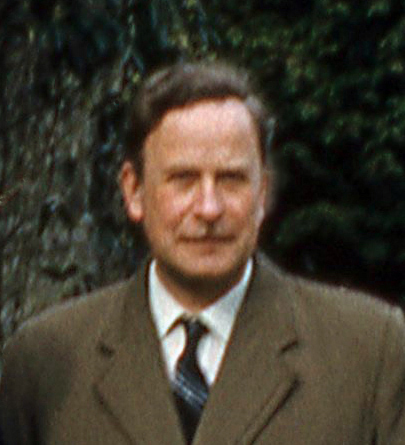
- Born: February 8, 1915; Shaanxi, China
- Died: September 18, 1990 (aged 75); Castle Douglas, Scotland
- Citizenship: (Canada) Canadian
- Occupation: Geographer
- Spouse: Jessie Watson née Black
- Children: Margaret, James
- Writing career
- Language: English
- Notable awards: Governor General's Award

Prof James Wreford Watson FRSE FRSC IBG LLD (February 8, 1915 – September 18, 1990) was a Scottish Canadian geographer and cartographer, who served as the Chief Geographer of Canada and the first president of the Canadian Association of Geographers. He was also a poet who wrote under the name James Wreford and was the recipient of Canada's top literary honor, the Governor General's Award, for his poetry.

== Life and work ==
James Wreford Watson was born in Shaanxi in China on 8 February 1915, the son of Rev. James Watson, a missionary, and his wife, Evelyn Russell.

Watson was home-schooled in China, then the family returned to Edinburgh in Scotland, where he was then educated at George Watson's College. He then studied sciences at the University of Edinburgh, graduating with a BA in 1936. In 1937, he began lecturing in Geography at the University of Sheffield.

In 1939, Watson married Jessie W. Black (d.1989), a University of Edinburgh professor of education. Together they had two children, Margaret and James. The couple moved to Canada the same year.

Watson took a position at McMaster University in Hamilton, Ontario, as the university's first regular appointment in geography. He lectured at McMaster from 1939 to 1949. In 1945 he received a Ph.D. from the University of Toronto.

In 1949 Watson moved to Ottawa to become chief geographer for the Government of Canada, a position he held until 1954. He held a concurrent appointment at Ottawa's Carleton University from 1951 to 1954.

Watson became a naturalized Canadian citizen in 1953. In 1954, though, he returned to Scotland, to take the University of Edinburgh's chair of geography.

He taught at the University of Edinburgh from 1954 to 1975. From 1975 to 1982 he was the director of the Centre for Canadian Studies, in Edinburgh. During that time he was also visiting professor at Queen's University (1959–1960, 1963, 1978), University of Manitoba (1969–1970), University of British Columbia (1971), Simon Fraser University (1976–1977), and the University of Calgary (1980–1981 and 1983).

He died in the town of Castle Douglas in Scotland on 18 September 1990.

=== Social Geography ===
Watson was a pioneer of social geography. He applied the ideas of the Chicago school of social ecology to explain urban geography; the basic theory being that the urban landscape can be explained in terms of its society's social structure. His work "helped develop social geography as a systematic specialization." For instance, he "used the language of the social ecologists to recognize urban transition zones, cultural shatter belts, and distinct zones associated with the different socioeconomic groups within Hamilton."

Watson also applied the concepts of social geography on a continental scale to examine regional differentiation in North America. "Here his work emphasized social problems associated with multiracial development, the ‘energy crisis’, conservation of resources, urban decay, and suburban sprawl."

== Poetry ==
James Wreford's standing in Canadian poetry rests mainly on two publications. The first was the seminal 1944 anthology Unit of Five, which featured thirteen of his poems (alongside poetry by Louis Dudek, Ronald Hambleton, P. K. Page, and Raymond Souster). The Dictionary of Literary Biography (DLB) says that they show "his technical skill – particularly in the use of the quatrain"; but also his weaknesses: obscurantism, didactism, and a habit of asking questions, "which becomes ponderous at times."

The DLB classified the poetry of Wreford's award-winning first book, Of Time and the Lover (1950), "as Christian pastoral elegy in that many of his poems portray man existing in a fallen world.... The poet seeks for himself and mankind ... redemption, renewed life, and hope." It also noted Watson's "use of climatological, geological, and geographical images and metaphors."

Geography was also prominent in Wreford's second and last book of poetry, 1979's Countryside Canada. There the poet "responds through poetry to a series of places, from Newfoundland to the Yukon ... the geographer-poet attempts to demonstrate the strength of his culture and his own personal roots in it."

== Recognition ==
Watson's first book of poetry, Of Time and the Lover, won the Governor General's Award in 1950.

Watson was elected a Fellow of the Royal Society of Canada in 1954, and of the Royal Society of Edinburgh in 1957. In 1960 he received the Murchison Award of the Royal Geographical Society.

The Canadian Geographers Association gave Watson a special award in 1987 for his services to Canadian geography.

He held honorary degrees from five universities.

A festschrift, A Social Geography of Canada: Essays in Honour of J. Wreford Watson, was published in 1988.

The School of GeoSciences at the University of Edinburgh commemorates Watson's life and work with the Wreford Watson Lecture Series.

== Publications ==
=== Prose ===
- The Geography of the Niagara Peninsula, with Special Emphasis on Changes in Land Use and Settlement. Toronto: U of Toronto P, 1945.
- General Geography (1953)
- North America, Its Countries and Regions. London, Longmans, 1963.
- The Canadians: How They Live and Work by Jessie Watson, James Wreford Watson (David & Charles Publishers) ISBN 0-88760-085-9
- Social Geography of the United States by Jessie Watson, James Wreford Watson (Longman, 1979) ISBN 0-582-48197-X

=== Poetry ===
- Unit of Five: Louis Dudek, Ronald Hambleton, P. K. Page, Raymond Souster, James Wreford. (Toronto: Ryerson Press, 1944).
- Of Time and the Lover. Toronto: McClelland & Stewart, 1950.
- Countryside Canada.Fredericton, NB: Fiddlehead, 1979.

=== Edited ===
- with J.B. Sissons. The British Isles. Edinburgh. Published for the 20th International Geographic Conference.
