= Outland =

Outland may refer to in:

== Music ==
- Outland (Spear of Destiny album), a 1987 album by Spear of Destiny
- Outland (Gary Numan album), a 1991 album by Gary Numan
- Outland (Pete Namlook and Bill Laswell album), a 1994 album by Pete Namlook & Bill Laswell
- Outland, a song by Canadian band Synæsthesia from their 1995 Embody album
- Outland (JøKleBa album), 2014

== Film and tv ==
- Outland (film), a 1981 film directed by Peter Hyams and starring Sean Connery
- Outland (TV series), a 2012 comedy from the Australian Broadcasting Corporation

== Video games ==
- Outland (Warcraft), a remnant of Draenor, a world in the fictional Warcraft universe
- Outland (video game), a 2011 platform game for Xbox Live Arcade and PlayStation Network

== Other arts ==
- Outland (comic strip), a comic strip written and illustrated by Berkeley Breathed
- Outland, a fictional location in the Sylvie and Bruno books by Lewis Carroll

== Other ==
- Outland Trophy, a trophy awarded annually to the best college football lineman in the United States
- Outland, Lesbian/Womyn's land and retreat in New Mexico

== See also ==
- Outer Lands
- Outlander (disambiguation)
- Outlands (disambiguation)
