= St. Hyacinth =

St. Hyacinth or Saint Hyacinthe may refer to:

== People ==
- Hyacinth of Caesarea (died 108), early Christian martyr
- Hyacinth and Protus (martyred 257-9), Christian saints
- Hyacinth of Poland (c. 1185 - 1257), Dominican friar and saint
- Hyacintha Mariscotti (1585–1640), Italian Franciscan nun and saint
- Giacinto Giordano Ansaloni (1598-1634), Italian Dominican martyred in Japan

== Places in Canada ==
- Saint-Hyacinthe, Quebec, a city
- St. Hyacinthe (electoral district), a former federal electoral district in Quebec
- Saint-Hyacinthe—Bagot, a federal electoral district in Quebec
- Saint-Hyacinthe (provincial electoral district), a provincial electoral riding in the Montérégie region of Quebec

== Sports ==
- Saint-Hyacinthe Laser, a former junior ice hockey team in the Quebec Major Junior Hockey League, Canada
- Saint-Hyacinthe Chiefs, a former minor hockey team in the Ligue Nord-Américaine de Hockey, Canada

== Other uses ==
- Saint-Hyacinthe railway station, a Via Rail station in Saint-Hyacinthe, Quebec, Canada
- Saint-Hyacinthe Aerodrome, located just west of Saint-Hyacinthe, Quebec, Canada
- Cégep de Saint-Hyacinthe, a college of general and vocational education

== See also ==
- Hyacinth (disambiguation)
- San Jacinto (disambiguation), "Saint Hyacinth" in Spanish
- St. Hyacinth's Church (disambiguation)
