= Hyacinthe (disambiguation) =

Hyacinthe is a given name.

Hyacinthe may also refer to:

- Hyacinthe, Martinique, a village and a headland in the commune of Le Robert
- Saint-Hyacinthe, Quebec, a city in Canada
- Kimberly Hyacinthe (born 1989), Canadian athlete specializing in the sprinting events
- Cyclone Hyacinthe, the wettest tropical cyclone on record worldwide

== See also ==
- Hyacinth (disambiguation)
