= USS Hyacinth =

USS Hyacinth may refer to the following ships of the United States Navy:

- USS Hyacinth (1862), was a tugboat used by the US Army, transferred to the US Navy on 30 September 1862 and sold 17 August 1865
- USS Hyacinth (1902), was a lighthouse tender launched in July 1902, transferred to the US Navy in April 1917 and returned to the Department of Commerce in July 1919
