= 46th Indiana Infantry Regiment =

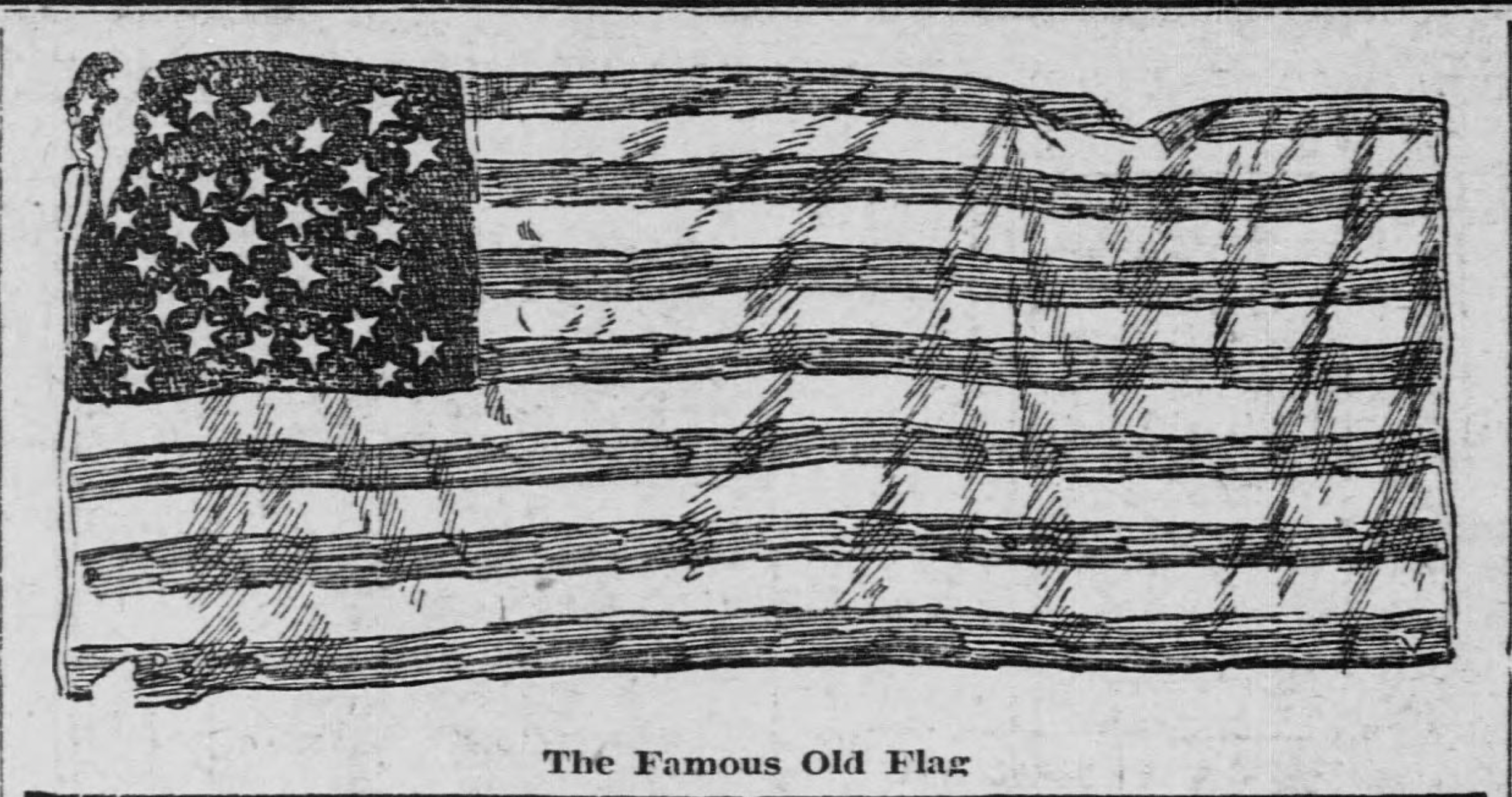
- Active: 1861–1865
- Country: United States (Union)
- Allegiance: Indiana
- Type: Regiment
- Role: Infantry
- Facings: Light blue
- Engagements: American Civil War; Battle of Island No. 10; Battle of St. Charles; Battle of Port Gibson; Battle of Champion Hill; Siege of Vicksburg; Bayou Teche Campaign; Battle of Sabine Crossroads

The 46th Regiment Indiana Infantry was a regiment of the Union Army during the American Civil War.

== Formation ==
The 46th Indiana Infantry Regiment was organized at Logansport, Indiana and mustered in for a three-year enlistment on December 11, 1861, under the command of Colonel Graham N. Fitch.

The regiment was attached to 19th Brigade, Army of the Ohio, January 1862. 19th Brigade, 4th Division, Army of the Ohio, to February 1862. 1st Brigade, 2nd Division, Army of the Mississippi, to April 1862. 2nd Brigade, 3rd Division, Army of the Mississippi, to July 1862. Helena, Arkansas, District of Eastern Arkansas, Department of the Missouri, to December 1862. 1st Brigade, 2nd Division, District of Eastern Arkansas, Department of the Tennessee, to January 1863. 1st Brigade, 12th Division, XIII Corps, Army of the Tennessee, to February 1863. 1st Brigade, 13th Division, XIII Corps, to March 1863. 1st Brigade, 12th Division, XIII Corps, to July 1863. 1st Brigade, 3rd Division, XIII Corps, Army of the Tennessee, to August 1863, and Department of the Gulf to July 1864. 4th Brigade, 1st Division, District of Kentucky, Department of the Ohio, to December 1864. Garrison, Lexington, Kentucky, District of Kentucky, Department of the Ohio, to February 1865, and Department of Kentucky to September 1865.

== Battle actions ==
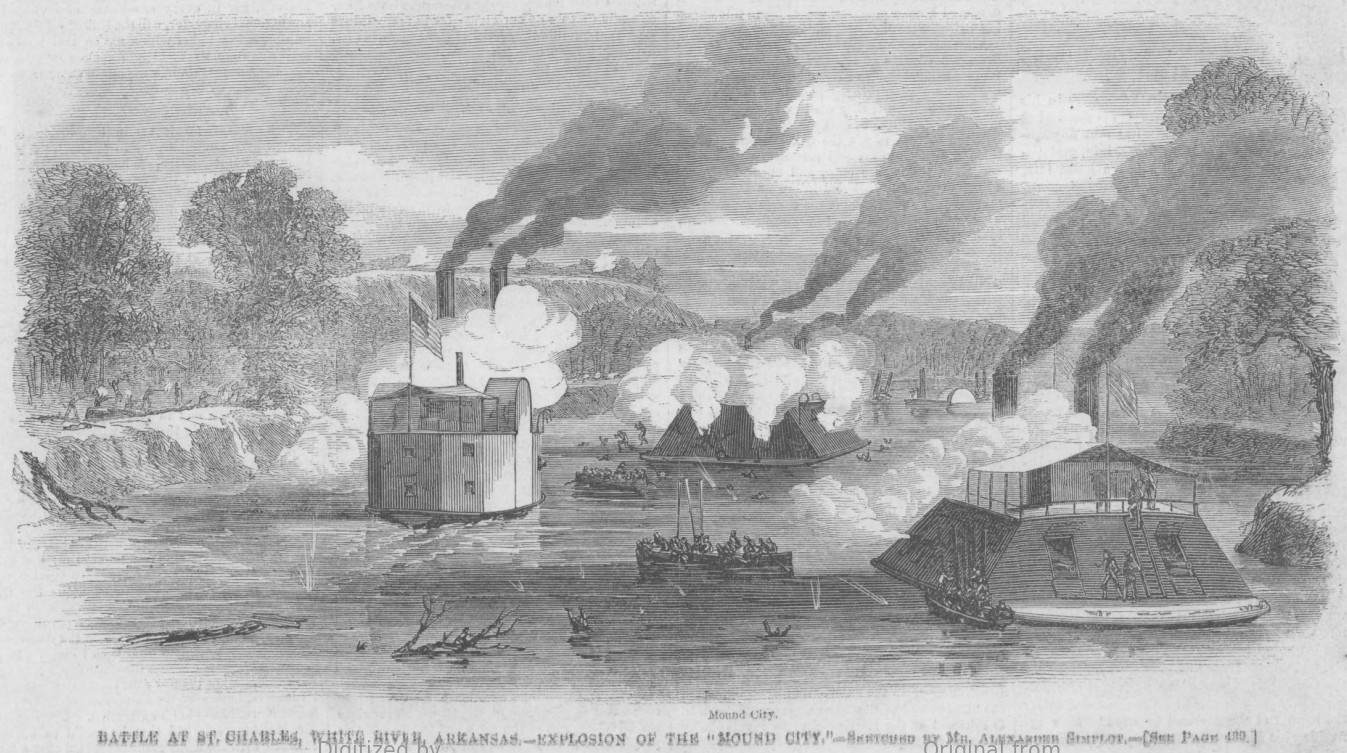
The Battle at St. Charles, White River, Arkansas—Explosion of the "Mound City" by Alexander Simplot

Ordered to Kentucky and duty at Camp Wickliffe until February 1862. Ordered to Commerce, Missouri, February 16, 1862. Siege of New Madrid, Missouri, March 5–14. Siege and capture of Island No. 10, Mississippi River, March 15-April 8. Expedition to Fort Pillow, Tennessee, April 13–17. Operations against Fort Pillow April 17-June 5. Capture of Fort Pillow June 5. Occupation of Memphis, Tennessee, June 6. Expedition up White River, Arkansas, June 10-July 14. St. Charles June 17. Grand Prairie July 6–7. Duvall's Bluff July 7. Duty at Helena, Arkansas, until April 1863. Expedition to Arkansas Post November 16–22, 1862. Expedition to Yazoo Pass by Moon Lake, Yazoo Pass, and Coldwater and Tallahatchie Rivers February 24-April 5. Operations against Fort Pemberton and Greenwood March 11-April 5. Fort Pemberton March 11. Moved to Milliken's Bend, Louisiana, April 12. Movement on Bruinsburg and turning Grand Gulf April 25–30. Battle of Port Gibson, Mississippi, May 1–14. Mile Creek April 12–13. Battle of Champion Hill May 16. Siege of Vicksburg May 18-July 4. Assaults on Vicksburg May 19 and 22. Advance on Jackson July 4–10. Near Jackson July 9. Siege of Jackson July 10–17. Ordered to New Orleans, Louisiana, August 10. Duty at Carrollton, Brashear City, and Berwick until October. Western Louisiana "Teche" Campaign October 3-November 30. Grand Coteau November 3. Moved to New Orleans, Louisiana, December 17. Regiment reenlisted January 2, 1864. Red River Campaign March 10-May 22. Advance from Franklin to Alexandria March 14–26. Battle of Sabine Cross Roads April 8. Monett's Ferry, Cane River Crossing. April 23. Alexandria April 30-May 10. Graham's Plantation May 6. Retreat to Morganza May 13–20. Mansura May 16. Expedition to the Atchafalaya May 30-June 5. Moved to New Orleans, Louisiana, then home on veteran furlough June 12. Expedition down the Ohio River toward Shawneetown, Illinois, to suppress insurrection, and from Mt. Vernon, Indiana, into Kentucky against Confederate recruiting parties August 16–22. White Oak Springs August 17. Gouger's Lake August 18. Smith's Mills August 19. Moved to Lexington, Kentucky, for provost duty. Burbridge's Expedition to Saltsville, Virginia, September 17-October 19. Garrison, Prestonburg, and Catlettsburg, Kentucky, during the expedition. Return to Lexington and garrison duty there until September 1865. Moved to Louisville, Kentucky.

The 46th Indiana Infantry mustered out of service September 4, 1865, at Louisville, Kentucky.

== Casualties ==
The regiment lost a total of 264 men during service; 4 officers and 66 enlisted men killed or mortally wounded, 3 officers and 191 enlisted men died of disease.

== Commanders ==
- Colonel Graham N. Fitch
- Colonel Thomas H. Bringhurst
- Lieutenant Colonel Newton G. Scott - commanded at the Battle of Island No. 10

== See also ==
- Indiana in the Civil War
- List of Indiana Civil War regiments

== Sources ==
- Benefiel, John K. The Diary of John K. Benefiel for the Year 1864: A Civil War Soldier, 46th Reg. Indiana Vol., Reflecting the Experiences of a Pulaski County, Indiana Soldier (Troutdale, OR: s.n.), 1972.
- Dyer, Frederick H. A Compendium of the War of the Rebellion (Des Moines, IA: Dyer Pub. Co.), 1908.
- Bringhurst, Thomas H.; Swigart, Frank (1888). History of the Forty-Sixth Regiment Indiana Volunteer Infantry, September, 1861-September, 1865. Logansport, IN: Press of Wilson, Humphreys & Co.
- Prison Life in Texas: An Account of the Capture, and Imprisonment of a Portion of the 46th Regiment, Indiana Veteran Volunteers, in Texas (Logansport, IN: Journal Office), 1865.
- Underhill, Joshua Whittington. Helena to Vicksburg: A Civil War Odyssey, the Personal Diary of Joshua Whittington Underhill, Surgeon, 46th Regiment, Indiana Volunteer Infantry, 23 October 1862-21 July 1863 (Lincoln Center, MA: Heritage House, Publishers), 2000. ISBN 1-882063-49-X
- Voorhis, Jerry. The Life and Times of Aurelius Lyman Voorhis (New York: Vantage Press), 1976. ISBN 0-533-02351-3
