= Hyacinth of Caesarea =

2nd-century Christian martyr and saint

Saint Hyacinth of Caesarea
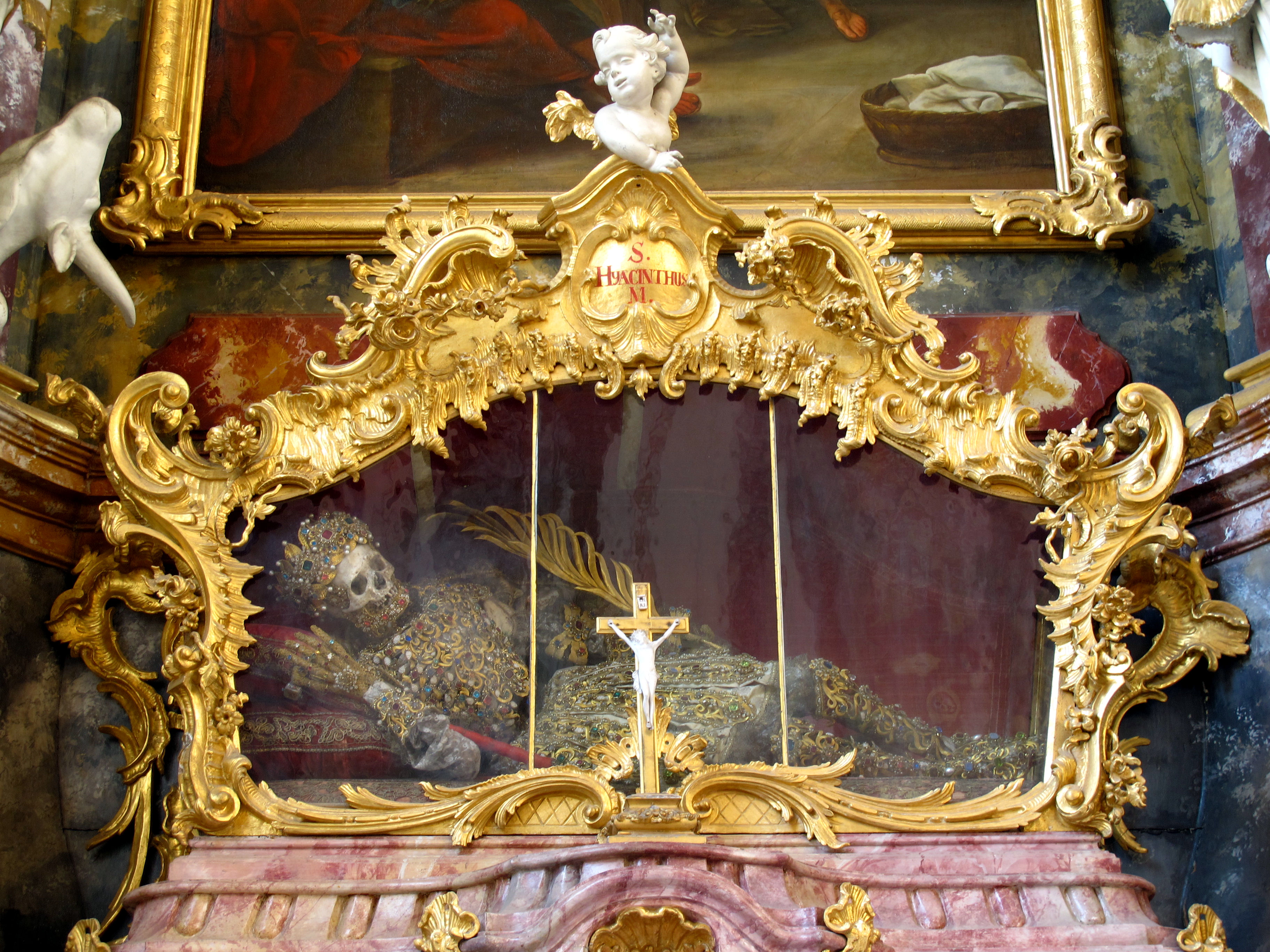
- Jewel-encrusted human skeleton in a gilded glass case labeled "S. HYACINTHUS M." (Saint Hyacinth, Martyr) in the Roman Catholic Church of the Assumption, the church of the former Cistercian Fürstenfeld Abbey in Bavaria

Martyr
- Born: 96; Caesarea, Cappadocia; Roman Empire (modern-day Kayseri, Turkey)
- Died: 108 (aged 12); Rome, Roman Empire (modern-day Italy)
- Venerated in: Eastern Orthodox Church; Roman Catholic Church
- Canonized: Pre-congregation
- Major shrine: Fürstenfeld Abbey; Bavaria, Germany
- Feast: 3 July

Hyacinth (Greek: Ὑάκινθος, Hyakinthos; died 108 AD) was a young Christian living at the start of the second century, who is honored as a martyr and a saint by both the Eastern Orthodox Church and the Roman Catholic Church. Hyacinth is sometimes called by his Latin name Hyacinthus (in French: Hyacinthe; Spanish: Jacinto; and Italian: Giacinto).

== Legend ==
According to tradition, he was a native of Caesarea in Cappadocia, a member of a Christian family. As a boy, he was appointed to serve as an assistant to the chamberlain to the Emperor Trajan. His failure to participate in the ceremonial sacrifices to the official Roman gods soon came to be noticed by other members of the Imperial household.

When he was denounced as a Christian, Hyacinth proclaimed his faith. As a result, he was imprisoned and underwent numerous scourgings and tortures. He was deliberately served only food which had been blessed for sacrifice to the gods, the eating of which was banned by Christianity. Thus, he starved to death in 108 AD, dying at the age of twelve. Just before his death, legend says, his jailers saw him being comforted by angels, who bestowed a crown on him.

Hyacinth died in the city of Rome. Later, the saint's relics were transferred to Caesarea.

While most of Fürstenfeld Abbey was secularized in 1803, the former abbey church is still in use. The church contains a jewel-encrusted human skeleton in a gilded glass case labeled "S. HYACINTHUS M." (Saint Hyacinth, Martyr). The skeleton arrived at Fürstenfeld Abbey at an unknown date. Writing of Europe's skeletons of "catacomb saints", art historian Paul Koudounaris alleges that they "could have been anyone, but they were pulled out of the ground and raised to the heights of glory."

Many places, people, and other entities are named after Hyacinth (or Jacinto, the Spanish form of "Hyacinth"). See the disambiguation pages in the "See also" section, below.

Hyacinth is not to be confused with the third-century martyr Hyacinth (died c. 257) or the medieval Polish Dominican saint Hyacinth of Poland.

== See also ==
- St. Hyacinth (disambiguation)
- San Jacinto (disambiguation) (the Spanish form of "Saint Hyacinth")
- Hyacinth (disambiguation)
