= 1950 Governor General's Awards =

Canadian literary award

In Canada, the 1950 Governor General's Awards for Literary Merit were the fourteenth such awards. The awards in this period had no monetary prize but were an honour for the authors.

== Winners ==
- Fiction: Germaine Guèvremont, The Outlander.
- Poetry or Drama: James Wreford Watson, Of Time and the Lover.
- Non-Fiction: Marjorie Wilkins Campbell, The Saskatchewan.
- Non-Fiction: W. L. Morton, The Progressive Party in Canada.
- Juvenile: Donalda Dickie, The Great Adventure.
- Leacock Medal for Humour: Eric Nicol, The Roving I.
