= Jacinta Brondgeest =

American musician

- Also known as: Jacinta
- Born: Jacinta Anne Brondgeest; Portland, Oregon, U.S.
- Origin: Sydney, Australia
- Genres: Pop; Electro house; Dance; House
- Occupations: Musician; singer; composer; music producer; electronic dance music artist
- Instruments: Vocals; piano; keyboards; samplers; grooveboxes; sax; guitar
- Years active: 1996-2018
- Labels: Cat Music

Jacinta Anne Brondgeest, a.k.a. Jacinta, is an American musician, singer, composer, music producer, and electronic dance music artist.

== Life and career ==
Jacinta Brondgeest was born in Portland, Oregon and grew up in Sydney. She started her musical career working in local bands. Her debut solo album, Sandalwood: Under the Influence, appeared in 2000. She wrote the track, "Wonderland", which was recorded for The Saddle Club, an Australian-Canadian children's TV show. As a single it peaked at No. 7 on the Australian Singles Chart in September 2003. "Wonderland" spent 11 weeks on the AIR Independent Charts, peaking at #2, October 13, 2003.

After moving to Austin, Texas, to try her luck in the States, in 2005 Jacinta issued her second album, Smokescreen, whose first single, "Sunshine", had its own album of remixes that came out the same year. "Destination" followed in 2006, then top 10 Billboard Dance Hit "Can’t Keep It a Secret" in 2007, and "Electric Universe" in 2008.

Billboard Magazine Chart Hits—In 2006, "Sunshine" rose to #20 on the Billboard Hot Club Play Chart, and in that same year, "Destination" climbed to #23. In 2007, "Can't Keep It a Secret" climbed to #7 on the Billboard Hot Club Play Chart.

Her debut on the European Dance scene came in 2009 with "Share the Tears" by AurA and "Lost in a Dream" by Javah both featuring Jacinta's vocals.

Jacinta has played an artist showcase during the 2011 SXSWmusic conference in Austin Texas, March 18, 2011.

== Awards ==
In March 2008, Jacinta was a nominee for Best Break-Through Artist at The WMC (Winter Music Conference) International Dance Music Awards, and in 2010 won first place in the USA Songwriting Competition for her song "Can't Keep It a Secret" (Dance/Electronica category). Jacinta is a 2010 finalist (with her song "Electric Universe") in the International Songwriting Competition (ISC).

== Discography ==
- PEACE BE WITH YOU - released on Bill Friar Entertainment, Oct 17, 2015
- BETTER WAY - released on King Street Sounds, Aug 15, 2013
- CALM BEFORE THE STORM - released on Tactal Hots, Dec 15, 2012
- SOMEWHERE OVER THE RAINBOW - released on CAPP Records, Oct 7, 2010
- ALWAYS BESIDE ME - released on Destune Records, Sept 1, 2010
- MAGIC - released on CAPP Records, Feb 26, 2010
- LUMINA - Songs of Light from the Dark Hours – 9 tracks - released on Chunky Music, Dec 14, 2009.
- LOST IN A DREAM (Javah f/Jacinta) released on Spinnin' Records, Nov, 2009.
- SHARE THE TEARS (AurA f/Jacinta) released on Five Star Records, 2009
- PAST LIFE MEDITATION (Jacinta & Psychic Norbert) released on Chunky Music, 2009.
- DAY IN TIME (WildJaam f/Jacinta and Amber Dirks) released on Chunky Music/Power2Move, Feb 4, 2009.
- I SEE FIRE (Cybersutra f/ Jacinta) - released on Kult Records Jan 6 2009
- ELECTRIC UNIVERSE - The Definitive Remixes - released on Chunky Music Oct 24, 2008
- ELECTRIC UNIVERSE - released on Chunky Music Oct 10, 2008
- CAN'T KEEP IT A SECRET - The Secret Remixes, released on Chunky Music July 2007
- CAN'T KEEP IT A SECRET, released on Chunky Music June 5, 2007
- DESTINATION, 10 remixes on mega single, released on Chunky Music May 2006
- DESTINATION: CLUB CUTZ, 6 remixes and acapellas, released on Chunky Music July 2006
- SUNSHINE, 9 remixes on mega single, released on Chunky Music October 2005
- SMOKESCREEN, released on Chunky Music 2005.
- SANDALWOOD ~ UNDER THE INFLUENCE, released on Chunky Music 2000.
- DEDICATED TO A STRANGER, limited release, 1996
