= Hyacinth, Virginia =

Unincorporated community in Virginia, U.S.

Coordinates: 37°59′26″N 76°35′25″W

Hyacinth is an unincorporated community in Northumberland County, in the U.S. state of Virginia.
