= USS Thistle (1862) =

Gunboat of the United States Navy

History

United States
- Ordered: as Spiteful
- Laid down: date unknown
- Launched: date unknown
- Acquired: 1 October 1862
- In service: October 1862
- Out of service: 12 August 1865
- Stricken: 1865 (est.)
- Fate: Sold, 17 August 1865

General characteristics
- Displacement: 50 tons
- Length: not known
- Beam: not known
- Draught: not known
- Propulsion: steam engine; side wheel-propelled
- Speed: not known
- Complement: not specified
- Armament: one 12-pounder smoothbore gun

The first USS Thistle was a Union Army steamer acquired by the United States Navy during the American Civil War.

Thistle was placed in service and used by the Union Navy as a tugboat and, when the opportunity presented itself, as a gunboat, in the blockade of ports of the Confederate States of America.

== Civil War operations ==
=== Transfer of Thistle from the Army to the Navy ===
Thistle—formerly the Army tug Spiteful—was transferred by the War Department to the Union Navy on 1 October 1862.

=== Assigned to the Mississippi Squadron as a tug and recon vessel ===
Thistle deployed with the Mississippi Squadron as a tug and reconnaissance vessel in October 1862 and participated in the capture of Fort Hindman, Arkansas, on 11 January 1863.

From 14 to 27 March, she took part in an expedition in the Steele's Bayou Expedition in Mississippi, attempting to find an entrance into the Yazoo River, Mississippi, and a rear approach to the Confederate stronghold at Vicksburg, Mississippi.

After the expedition failed, Thistle rejoined the squadron in the Mississippi River. There, she performed dispatch and reconnaissance duty for the remainder of the war.

== Post-war decommissioning and sale ==
Thistle was decommissioned at Mound City, Illinois., on 12 August 1865 and was sold at public auction there on 17 August to J. T. Haight.

== See also ==
- Anaconda Plan
