= Confection of hyacinth =

In pre-modern medicine, the confection of hyacinth had nearly the same virtues with that of alkermes; but, beside that, was frequently used as an astringent. It consisted of nearly triple the number of drugs; of which the precious stone, called hyacinth, was the base. The other chief ingredients were red coral, bole armoniac, terra sigillata, myrrh, the santals, burnt hartshorn, camphor, sapphire, emerald, topaz, uranium, and most of the ingredients of the confection of alkermes.
