= Vyborg Cathedral =

Demolished cathedral in Vyborg, Russia

Coordinates: 60°42′33″N 28°44′44″E

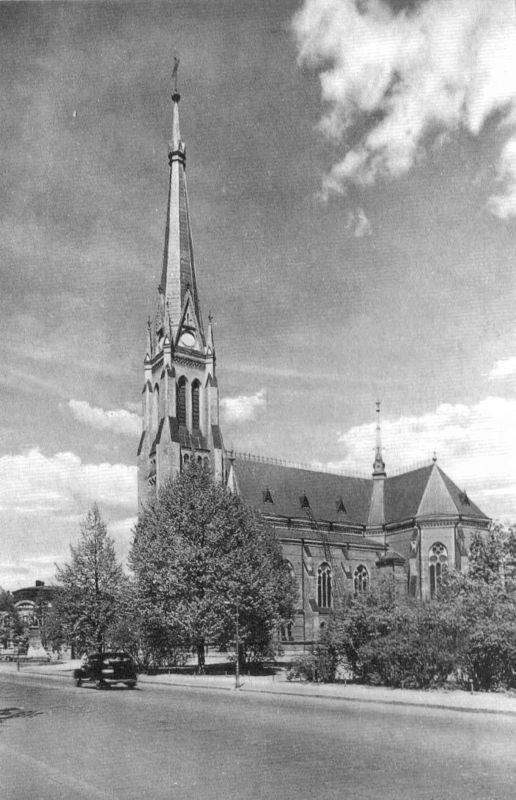
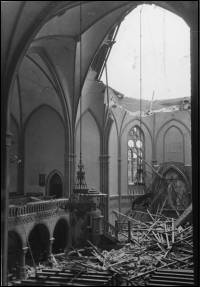
The cathedral before and after the Soviet bombing on 3 February 1940

Viipuri Cathedral (Finnish: Viipurin tuomiokirkko, IPA: [ˈʋiːpurin ˈtuo̯mioˌkirkːo]), also known as Viborg Cathedral (Swedish: Viborgs domkyrka) or Vyborg Cathedral (Russian: Вы́боргский кафедра́льный собо́р, romanized: Výborgskiy kafedrálʹny sobór, IPA: [ˈvɨbərkskʲɪj kəfʲɪˈdralʲnɨj sɐˈbor]), was a Lutheran church in Viipuri, present-day Russia; during its lifetime part of the Grand Duchy of Finland and later independent Finland. It was built in 1893. At first it was called the New Church and after 1908, when the Mikael Agricola statue was erected in front of the church, the Agricola Church. From 1925 to 1940 it was the cathedral of the Diocese of Viipuri. It was also called the New Cathedral (Note: Finnish: Viipurin uusi tuomiokirkko, IPA: [ˈʋiːpurin ˈuːsi ˈtuo̯mioˌkirkːo]; Swedish: Viborgs nya domkyrka; Russian: Но́вый кафедра́льный собо́р, romanized: Nóvy kafedrálʹny sobór, IPA: [ˈnovɨj kəfʲɪˈdralʲnɨj sɐˈbor], lit. 'New Cathedral') in order to separate it from the medieval Old Viipuri Cathedral.

In 1881 Viipuri's Finnish parish was divided between the city and the surrounding rural municipality. The old church of the parish was left to the rural parish. The city parish needed a new church, which was built by Carl Eduard Dippell between 1889 and 1893 in Gothic Revival style.

In 1908, a bust by Emil Wikström of Mikael Agricola was added to the cathedral façade.

Viipuri was heavily bombarded during the Winter War. The altar side of the cathedral was hit by a bomb on 3 February 1940. Finland lost the city to the Soviet Union in the Moscow Peace Treaty, but conquered it back during the Continuation War in 1941. The cathedral had been partly dismantled by the Russians and the Finns didn't start to repair it during the war. In 1944 Viipuri was again lost to the Soviet Union and the cathedral was fully torn apart after the war.
