= San Jacinto High School =

San Jacinto High School can refer to:

- San Jacinto High School (San Jacinto, California)
- San Jacinto High School (Houston, Texas)
