= Outlands (magazine) =

Science fiction magazine

The cover of Outlands Magazine, Issue 1, Winter 1946

Outlands was a semi-professional science fiction-based magazine, only one issue of which was ever produced. Outlands was published by Outlands Publications in England in the winter of 1946. It was digest size, 40 pages long, and cost 1/6d.

== Background ==
The magazine was edited by Leslie J. Johnson, who had used his RAF gratuity to establish Outlands with fellow science-fiction fans. He edited the magazine from his home in Liverpool.

Johnson had previously worked on science fiction stories with John Russell Fearn and Eric Frank Russell, his co-writer on the story Seeker of Tomorrow which appeared in Astounding Stories magazine in July 1937.

Around the time of the magazine's launch in October 1946, a preliminary announcement described the magazine as "for all who seek wider fields of thought and imagination, and who aren't afraid to face facts that run counter to accepted beliefs." Offering scope for writers with original ideas, the creators distanced themselves from committing to any set formula for the magazine, and promised to feature whatever they wanted to write as long as it was "unique and significant." The creators attempted to solicit interest in advance of publication by circulating this announcement to science fiction and fantasy fans, and inviting anyone interested in receiving more information about the magazine to contact them at "Outlands Publications", 19 Richmond Avenue, Liverpool 21.

== Contents ==
The published magazine consisted of 40 pages of fiction and articles, and an editorial illustrating the stated aim of the creators "to interest you with stories and articles which will have a slant towards the future. Yet we don't like to say we are publishing any particular type of material. You may label our stories 'science fiction,' 'weird fiction' or 'fantasy'; call them what you will..."

Contents included science-fiction pieces by John Russell Fearn and George C. Wallis, and fantasy stories by Charnock Walsby, Sydney J. Bounds and John Gabriel. Articles included "Psychic Scents," by A. Hastwa, dealing with spiritualism and later reprinted in the December 1950 issue of Fate, and "Mystery Power," by Leslie V. Heald, citing inexplicable Fortean phenomena. The only story title displayed on the cover was 'Pre-Natal' by Fearn.

Other features covered an American fantasy fan convention and recent British science-fiction publications, alongside opportunities for readers to contribute, including "The Curious Club," which invited readers to submit reports and articles dealing with unusual events and bizarre ideas, as a basis for general discussion.

Bounds' debut professional sale under his own name appears in the first issue. 'Strange Portrait' is a macabre story based on the concept of The Picture of Dorian Gray in which a 'living' painting acts out the murderous jealousies of artist David Guest. The publication of his story left Bounds feeling that his post-war career as an electrical fitter seemed less inviting than one writing fiction.

"The Opaque Word" by Anthony Cotrion also appeared, alongside fiction by George C. Wallis and an obituary of H.G. Wells, who had only recently died on August 13, 1946.

== Reception ==
The magazine was first launched on a basis of private subscription only, but later appeared on the bookstalls priced at 1/6. A second issue of Outlands was never produced – even though it was advertised as being available in December – as distributors declined to handle it.
