= The Outlander (Canadian novel) =

- Title page for The Outlander (1950)
- Author: Germaine Guèvremont
- Translator: Eric Sutton
- Language: English (translated from French)
- Publisher: McGraw-Hill Book Company, Inc.
- Publication date: 1950
- Publication place: Canada
- Pages: 248

The Outlander is a French-Canadian novel written by Germaine Guèvremont in 1945 and translated by Eric Sutton in 1950. The Outlander is a combination of two of Guèvremont's books, Le Survenant and its sequel, Marie-Didace. The Outlander was published simultaneously in London, New York and Toronto. The English edition was entitled The Monk's Reach and the American edition The Outlander.

== Synopsis ==
Monk's Inlet is a village near Sorel. A stranger arrives one night and is invited to stay at the house of Didace Beauchemin. Old Didace offers him lodgings in exchange for his work. His son Amable and his daughter-in-law Alphonsine are suspicious of the intrusion of this stranger into the family, especially since he eclipses them with his strength and his hard work.

The Stranger, who never reveals his name or his origins, turns out to be a great storyteller. The villagers start to visit the Didace household, enthralled by tales of the outside world. Angelina, a neighbor who has rejected all the suitors of the neighborhood, falls in love with him and the Stranger seems to respond to her affections.

Over time, the Stranger is torn between his new attachments with Didace and Angelina and his urge to continue wandering. "If he stayed, there would be the house, security, economy in everything and everywhere, the little farm of twenty-seven acres and nine perches, and the constant worry about money ... if he went, there was freedom before him, the mountain trail, the mystery of falling darkness. And, suddenly a gust of wind and the tinkle of cattle bells. The yapping of a dog, wreathing smoke, a huddle of houses, strange faces. A new country, the road, the mighty world."

Eventually he realizes that the pettiness of the villagers means he will never be accepted as one of them. He gives in to the appeal of the road that has tormented him since the spring. At the beginning of autumn, a year after his arrival, he leaves as he had come, without even a goodbye to Angelina or Father Didace who had become his friend.

To conclude, the Stranger has changed the lives of the main characters in the story: the father Didace, widower, will fall in love with the Acayenne, widow too, and despite his advanced age, will decide at the end of the history of the marrying to found a new family, his son Amable and his daughter Alphonsine trying for a long time to found a family will wait for their first child and Angelina, falling in love with the Stranger, will be released from his protection.

== Reception ==
John Moss reviewed the book in his Reader's Guide to the Canadian Novel. He calls the Stranger an "enigmatic embodiment of the outside world". He says of the book, "it is a haunting blend of naturlism and surrealism, mixing graphic descriptions with elusive, allusive possibilities of meaning".

Lee Skallerup says the two novels are often cited as the "last" of the roman de terre, or novels of soil, a genre that dominated Quebec literature for almost 100 years. While the novels stay closely within the rules of the genre, evidence of the changing nature of society led to the decline of the rural way of life. These books can also be read as pre-feminist texts, questioning the traditional roles and limitations placed on women by Quebec society.

The book won the Governor General's Award for English-language fiction in 1950. There were also two awards for the original French version: the Prix David and the Prix Sully-Oliver de Serres de l'Académie Française, both awarded in 1946.
