= St. Charles, Arkansas =

- Town
- Location in Arkansas County and the state of Arkansas
- Coordinates: 34°22′30″N 91°07′55″W
- Country: United States
- State: Arkansas
- County: Arkansas

Area
  - Total: 0.89 sq mi (2.30 km^{2})
  - Land: 0.89 sq mi (2.30 km^{2})
  - Water: 0 sq mi (0.00 km^{2})
- Elevation: 200 ft (61 m)

Population (2020)
  - Total: 207
  - Estimate (2025): 191 ▼
  - Density: 233.5/sq mi (90.15/km^{2})
- Time zone: UTC-6 (Central (CST))
  - Summer (DST): UTC-5 (CDT)
- ZIP code: 72140
- Area code: 870
- FIPS code: 05-61940
- GNIS feature ID: 2407265
- Website: stcharlesar.com

St. Charles is a town in Arkansas County, Arkansas, United States. As of the 2020 census, St. Charles had a population of 207. The small town has been at the center of various events in Arkansas' history. St. Charles is best known for the Battle of Saint Charles, which was fought on the White River, which borders the town. St. Charles is also known for being in the White River National Wildlife Refuge.

== History ==
=== Early history ===
The area known as St. Charles was within the territory of the Middle Mississippian culture during the Woodland Period of Native American History. In early modern times, possibly after Hernando De Soto's initial exploration of the American Southeast, the area encompassing the whole of Arkansas County and much of Eastern Arkansas became Quapaw territory and remained so until the arrival of French explorers in the 17th century. After American settlers started to move into the Arkansas territory, A treaty signed in 1818 moved most all of the Quapaw from what is now Arkansas County to the center of the state. By 1833, the Quapaw were no longer in Arkansas. The first settler to set foot in what is Now St. Charles was French Coureur des Bois Pierre Pertuis, who moved to the area after having purchased land from the 1797 Spanish land grant. By 1839, Charles W. Belknap owned the site, known briefly as Belknap’s Bluff. He built an adobe house, one of only a few found on the Arkansas frontier. The house served as a hospital for both sides in the Civil War and was a longtime landmark. The name St. Charles first appears with Belknap’s appointment as postmaster in 1850. He platted the town and began selling lots. St. Charles flourished during the 1850s with the shipping of various products on the river. During the Arkansas' territorial period, The county seat was moved from Arkansas Post to Dewitt after many of the larger settlements, including St. Charles, wished to take power from Arkansas post after the Territorial capitol was moved to Little Rock.

=== Civil War and the Gilded Age ===
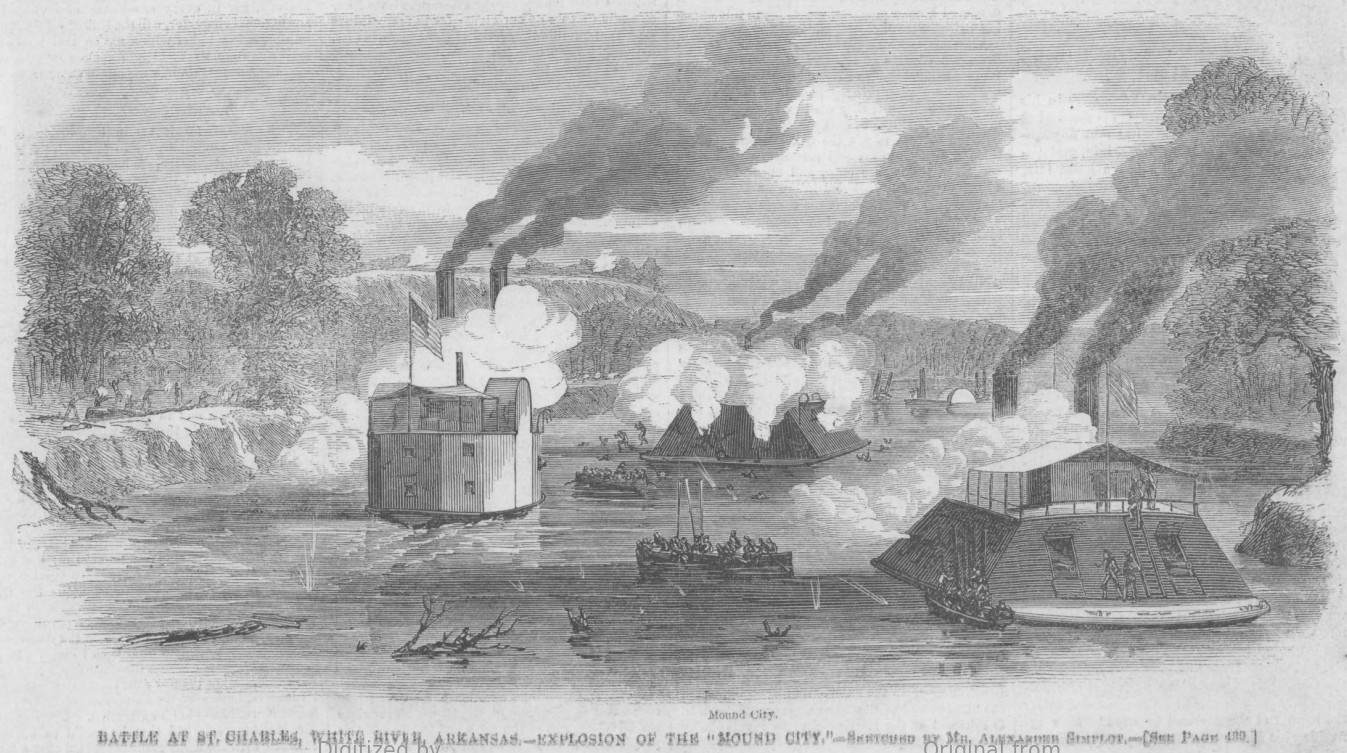
The Battle at St. Charles, White River, Arkansas—Explosion of the "Mound City" by Alexander Simplot

St. Charles is the site of the most deadly single shot of the American Civil War. On June 17, 1862, at the Battle of Saint Charles, eight Federal vessels including the ironclad gunboat USS Mound City attempted to pass Confederate shore guns here, on the banks of the White River. A single shot from a Confederate cannon entered the Mound City and penetrated her steam drum. The resulting explosion and release of scalding steam killed most of her crew, approximately 129 men.

St. Charles suffered like other southern communities after the Civil War. The town’s incorporation was in 1880. Until railroads came, it was an important port. Most commerce of inland communities passed through the town, until rails reached DeWitt (Arkansas County), after which St. Charles began declining. For many years, its economy depended on timber, fishing, hunting, trapping, mussels for the button industry, and crops. A school district opened in 1891, with the first commencement exercise in Arkansas County occurring in 1892.

=== St. Charles Lynching of 1904 ===
In the spring of 1904, St. Charles became the scene of what would become known as the "St. Charles Lynching of 1904". Over the course of four days, a succession of white mobs terrorized black families in the area, and lynched or otherwise murdered thirteen black people. The killers or mob members were never identified. The incident began on March 21, 1904, when Jim Searcy, a white man, began arguing with a black man named Griffin over a game of chance. The two men began to fight, and a local police officer arrested Griffin for assault, telling him he would be hanged. Whether the police officer was simply saying that to cause fear, or whether that was their actual intention, has never been known for certain.

In any event, having been told he would be hanged, Griffin struck the police officer, grabbed the officer's pistol, then fled. Griffin went into hiding, but angry white mobs were determined to locate him. By March 23, 1904, white mobs on horseback were accosting black citizens on sight, shooting those who resisted. Between sixty and seventy black men, women and children were driven from their homes and penned inside a warehouse. That night, members of the mob were intent on burning the warehouse with all inside. Some mob members began to argue to spare the lives of certain black persons who they personally knew, then other mob members began arguing for caution, believing the thing had gone too far. Around 3:00 am on March 24, 1904, angry white men stormed the warehouse and dragged six black men outside. They were marched to the high point on the highway between St. Charles and De Witt, made to stand in a line, then all six were shot dead. On March 27, 1904, the most detailed newspaper report of the killings, posted in the Arkansas Gazette, listed those who had been killed. They were Abe Bailey, Mack Baldwin, Will Baldwin, Garrett Flood, Randall Flood, Aaron Hinton, Will Madison, Charley Smith, Jim Smith, Perry Carter, Kellis Johnson, Henry Griffin, and Walker Griffin. The latter two were brothers, Walker Griffin being the man originally arrested. Their killings brought the total to thirteen. The investigation into the murders was all but nonexistent, with no one ever being arrested, tried, or interviewed. To this day it remains little known, but in fact it was one of the largest murders of this sort, given the population of the town at the time, in Arkansas history.

=== Present day ===
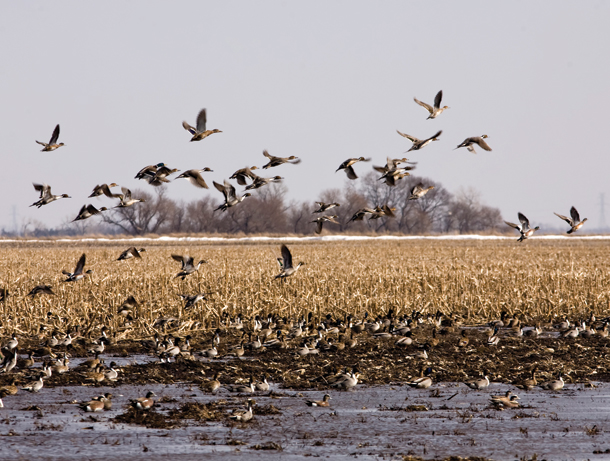
Duck hunting is a common pastime in St. Charles, which draws hunters from other parts of the South.

In 1935, the White River was designated a wildlife refuge and was named the White River National Wildlife Refuge, which protects the many types of wetland wildlife that calls the Lower White River home, though this refuge does allow for waterfowl hunting, namely ducks quail and pheasants. Charles has declined in tandem with many Delta towns since the expansion of large-scale industrial farming but has remained intact as a small town due to the influx of hunters, naturalist and birdwatchers that venture to the White River NWR.

In 2013, the refuge was given the distinction of being a National Blueway by the Fish and Wildlife service. Later in the year, they called for an expansion of more than 100,000 acres, which would be done through purchasing land from willing sellers. The purpose of this expansion would be to protect wildlife that lives on the lower river and it would also preserve the Arkansas "Big Woods", which only 10% remains. In 2014, the refuge was formally renamed the "Dale Bumpers White River National Wildlife Refuge" to honor former Arkansas Governor Dale Bumpers.

Historical population
Census	Pop.	Note	%±
1880	73		—
1890	128		75.3%
1920	200		—
1930	245		22.5%
1940	412		68.2%
1950	313		−24.0%
1960	255		−18.5%
1970	201		−21.2%
1980	199		−1.0%
1990	169		−15.1%
2000	261		54.4%
2010	230		−11.9%
2020	207		−10.0%
2025 (est.)	191	▼	−7.7%
U.S. Decennial Census

== Geography ==
According to the United States Census Bureau, the town has a total area of 0.85 sq mi (2.2 km^{2}), of which 0.0077 sq mi (0.02 km^{2}), or 1.04%, is water.

=== Climate ===
The climate in this area is characterized by hot, humid summers and generally mild to cool winters. According to the Köppen Climate Classification system, St. Charles has a humid subtropical climate, abbreviated "Cfa" on climate maps.^{[8]}

Climate data for St. Charles, Arkansas (1991–2020)
Month	Jan	Feb	Mar	Apr	May	Jun	Jul	Aug	Sep	Oct	Nov	Dec	Year
Mean daily maximum °F (°C)	50.0 (10.0)	54.7 (12.6)	63.6 (17.6)	72.4 (22.4)	80.0 (26.7)	87.0 (30.6)	90.1 (32.3)	89.7 (32.1)	84.9 (29.4)	74.6 (23.7)	62.4 (16.9)	52.7 (11.5)	71.8 (22.1)
Daily mean °F (°C)	41.3 (5.2)	45.1 (7.3)	53.5 (11.9)	62.0 (16.7)	70.3 (21.3)	77.8 (25.4)	80.8 (27.1)	79.9 (26.6)	74.0 (23.3)	62.8 (17.1)	51.9 (11.1)	44.0 (6.7)	62.0 (16.6)
Mean daily minimum °F (°C)	32.5 (0.3)	35.6 (2.0)	43.5 (6.4)	51.6 (10.9)	60.7 (15.9)	68.7 (20.4)	71.6 (22.0)	70.1 (21.2)	63.0 (17.2)	50.9 (10.5)	41.5 (5.3)	35.3 (1.8)	52.1 (11.2)
Average precipitation inches (mm)	4.36 (111)	4.70 (119)	5.73 (146)	5.86 (149)	4.49 (114)	3.54 (90)	3.80 (97)	2.76 (70)	3.02 (77)	3.79 (96)	4.55 (116)	5.28 (134)	51.88 (1,319)
Average snowfall inches (cm)	0.6 (1.5)	0.2 (0.51)	0.4 (1.0)	0.0 (0.0)	0.0 (0.0)	0.0 (0.0)	0.0 (0.0)	0.0 (0.0)	0.0 (0.0)	0.0 (0.0)	0.0 (0.0)	0.0 (0.0)	1.2 (3.01)
Source: NOAA

== Demographics ==
As of the census of 2000, there were 261 people, 113 households, and 81 families residing in the town. The population density was 117.2/km^{2} (303.8/mi^{2}). There were 150 housing units at an average density of 67.3/km^{2} (174.6/mi^{2}). The racial makeup of the town was 98.08% White, 1.75% Black or African American and 1.15% Native American. 0.77% of the population were Hispanic or Latino of any race.

There were 113 households, out of which 23.9% had children under the age of 18 living with them, 56.6% were married couples living together, 6.2% had a female householder with no husband present, and 28.3% were non-families. 25.7% of all households were made up of individuals, and 14.2% had someone living alone who was 65 years of age or older. The average household size was 2.31 and the average family size was 2.69.

In the town, the population was spread out, with 17.6% under the age of 18, 8.0% from 18 to 24, 24.5% from 25 to 44, 29.1% from 45 to 64, and 20.7% who were 65 years of age or older. The median age was 45 years. For every 100 females, there were 112.2 males. For every 100 females age 18 and over, there were 112.9 males.

The median income for a household in the town was $24,375, and the median income for a family was $29,167. Males had a median income of $25,417 versus $13,125 for females. The per capita income for the town was $13,481. About 18.8% of families and 22.7% of the population were below the poverty line, including 21.4% of those under the age of 18 and 19.1% of those 65 or over.

== Education ==
Residents are zoned to the DeWitt School District, including DeWitt High School. On July 1, 1985, the St. Charles School District consolidated into the DeWitt district.
