= Outlander Magazine =

British magazine

Outlander is a digital and print publication that covers fashion, culture, and lifestyle. It was founded in 2014 by Callum McCafferty and is based in London.
