= HMS Hyacinth =

Several ships of the Royal Navy have been named HMS Hyacinth after the hyacinth flower:

- HMS Hyacinth (1806), launched in 1806, was an 18-gun Cormorant-class ship-sloop, broken up in 1820.
- HMS Hyacinth (1829), launched in 1829, was a sixth-rate sloop. In 1839, fighting alongside HMS Volage, she destroyed 29 Chinese ships near Hong Kong. This battle was the first of many decisive victories of the British over the Qing Dynasty's military in the First Opium War.
- HMS Hyacinth (1881), launched in 1881, was a Satellite-class corvette. She served on the China station and was sold for breaking in 1902.
- HMS Hyacinth (1898), launched in 1898, was a Highflyer-class light cruiser. In 1910 she was responsible for shelling Dubai in the Hyacinth Incident. She served in the First World War and was scrapped in 1923.
- HMS Hyacinth (K84), launched in 1940, was a Flower-class corvette. She served in the Second World War, was loaned to the Royal Hellenic Navy in 1943 and renamed Apostolis.
