= Germaine Guèvremont =

Canadian writer (1893–1968)

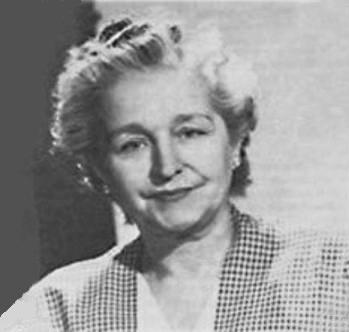
- Born: Germaine Grignon; April 16, 1893; Saint-Jérôme, Quebec, Canada
- Died: August 21, 1968 (aged 75)
- Occupations: Novelist; Short story writer Journalist
- Spouse: Hyacinthe "Hy" Guèvremont
- Writing career
- Period: 1930s-1960s
- Notable works: En pleine terre Le Survenant; Marie-Didace

Germaine Guèvremont, born Grignon (April 16, 1893 – August 21, 1968) was a Canadian writer, who was a prominent figure in Quebec literature.

Born in 1893 in Saint-Jérôme, Quebec, she was educated in Quebec and Toronto, and worked as a journalist for women's magazines before marrying Hyacinthe "Hy" Guèvremont and moving with him to Sorel in 1916. She was a housewife for a number of years, but later returned to journalism as a writer for The Gazette and an editor for Le Courrier de Sorel. The Guèvremonts later moved to Montreal, where Germaine worked as a court stenographer during the Great Depression. She also began to publish short stories, which were compiled into her debut book, En pleine terre, in 1938.

She published the novel Le Survenant in 1945, followed by the sequel Marie-Didace in 1947. The Outlander, an English translation of her two novels in one volume, was published in 1950, and won the fiction prize in the 1950 Governor General's Awards. The book was also published in the United Kingdom under the title Monk's Reach. She did not publish any further novels, but continued to publish journalism and short stories as well as writing radio and television adaptations of her fiction works. She began to write her memoirs late in life, but completed only two chapters before her death in 1968.

She was the cousin of Claude-Henri Grignon, the author of Un Homme et son péché. Ironically, Guèvremont's novels are largely recognized as the last influential examples of romans du terroir, the traditionalist form of Quebec literature in the early 20th century, while Grignon's Un Homme broke with that tradition and is recognized as one of Quebec's first influential modernist novels.

== Works ==
- En pleine terre (1942/1946)
- Le Survenant (1945)
- Marie-Didace (1947)
- The Outlander (1950; English translation of both Le Survenant and Marie-Didace in one volume)

== Awards and honours ==
In addition to her Governor General's Award win, Le Survenant won the Prix David from the government of Quebec and the Prix Sully-Olivier de Serres from the Académie française. She was a member of the Académie des lettres du Québec, and was honored on a postage stamp by Canada Post in 1976.

Le Survenant was chosen for the 2010 edition of Première Chaîne's Le Combat des livres.
