= List of storms named Hyacinth =

The name Hyacinth has been used for four tropical cyclones in the Eastern Pacific Ocean. The similar name Hyacinthe was used for one tropical cyclone in the Southwest Indian Ocean:

== Hyacinth ==
- Hurricane Hyacinth (1960) - Made landfall on western Mexico as a depression
- Tropical Storm Hyacinth (1968) - Struck Sinaloa, unknown damage
- Hurricane Hyacinth (1972) - Category 3 at peak; Made landfall in California as a weak depression, caused high surf
- Hurricane Hyacinth (1976) - Category 3, remained over open waters

== Hyacinthe ==
- Cyclone Hyacinthe - Wettest tropical cyclone ever recorded, dropped nearly twenty feet of rain in a caldera on Réunion and 3.3 feet in other areas.
