= St Protus and St Hyacinth's Church, Blisland =

St Protus and St Hyacinth’s Church, Blisland
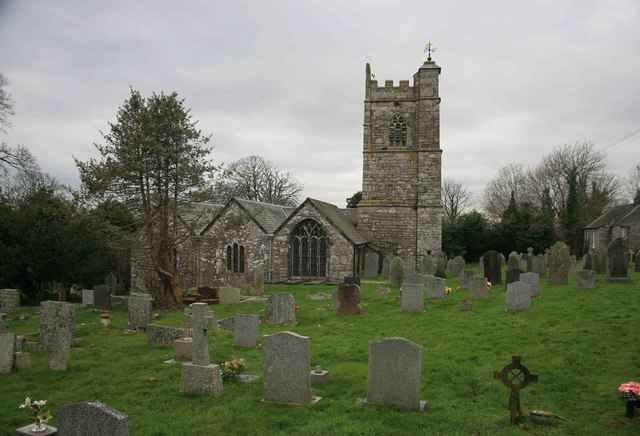
- St Protus and St Hyacinth’s Church, Blisland
- St Protus and St Hyacinth’s Church, Blisland
- 50°31′36.36″N 4°40′53.23″W
- Location: Blisland
- Country: England
- Denomination: Church of England
- Previous denomination: Roman Catholic

History
- Dedication: Saints Hyacinth and Protus

Administration
- Province: Canterbury
- Diocese: Truro
- Archdeaconry: Bodmin
- Deanery: Trigg Minor and Bodmin
- Parish: Blisland
- Location within Cornwall

Listed Building – Grade I
- Official name: Church of St Protus and St Hyacinth
- Designated: 6 June 1969
- Reference no.: 1142367

St Protus and St Hyacinth's Church, Blisland is a Grade I listed parish church in the Church of England in Blisland, Cornwall, England, UK.

== History and description ==
The church is of Norman origins, but was extended in the 15th century. The Norman nave and north transept of the church remain, with the six-arch south arcade, the aisle, the porch, the chapel coming off of the north transept, the wagon roof, a second font, and the tower from the north transept being added during the 15th century extension.

It was restored in 1894 at a cost of £1,300 by F. C. Eden, architect. The chancel was restored by the rector. The window in the end of the south chancel aisle was filled with stained glass designed by Bucknall and Comper of London, and donated by Mrs Lucy Edward-Collins, in memory of her husband, Revd. C. M. Edward-Collins, and her son, E. C. Edward-Collins of Trewardale. It reopened on 13 December 1894.

The present form of the dedication to Protus and Hyacinth relies on identifying the St Pratt of tradition with St Protus Martyr. (Locally the saint would be called St Pratt rather than Protus.) Dr Sidney J. Madge, father of the incumbent Rector Revd Sidney Alfred Wilmer Madge, published in 1950 a good account of the church and its two patron saints entitled Blisland Church and its Patron Saints; a 2nd edition was issued in 1965 with a preface by John Betjeman. Charles Henderson, writing in the Cornish Church Guide (1925) suggests that Lavethan (formerly Lanedewen) may record the original dedication of the church since the second element may be St Adwen (patron of Advent, Cornwall).

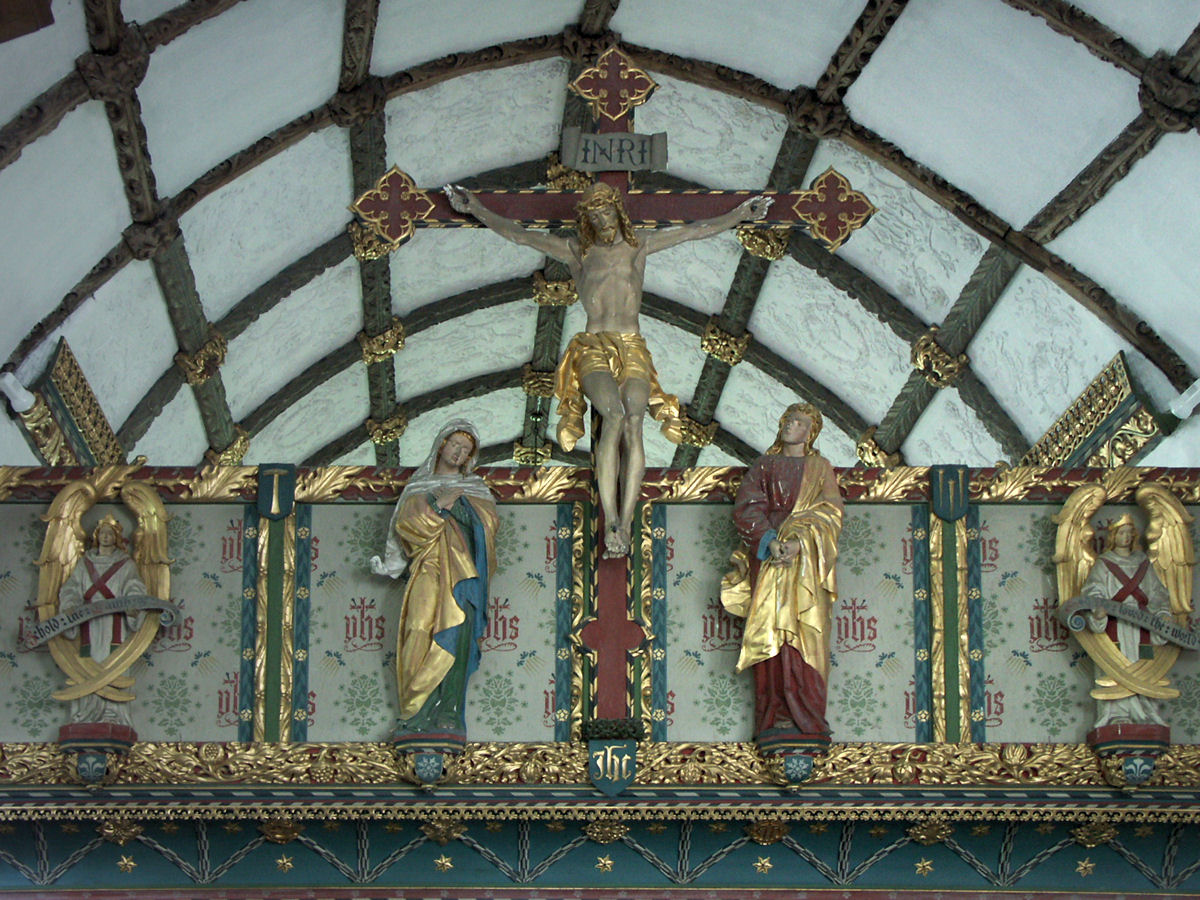
Detail of the rood screenn by F. C. Eden (1896)

The extensive restoration includes work by Ninian Comper and F. C. Eden. According to Betjeman: "As a restoration and even improvement on a medieval church, this holy and peaceful place ... can hardly be bettered in the kingdom." In the church is the early 15th century brass of John Balsam, formerly rector here.

== Parish status ==
The church is in a joint parish with

- St Catherine's Church, Temple
- St Breward's Church, St Breward
- St Helena's Church, Helland
