= Jacques-Hyacinthe Serry =

French Dominican Thomist theologian and conversialist

Jacques-Hyacinthe Serry (1659, Toulon – 12 March 1738, Padua) was a French Dominican Thomist theologian, controversialist and historian.

At the University of Padua from 1698, he taught theology based more closely on Biblical and patristic authority.

Under the pseudonym Augustinus Leblanc, he wrote the standard history Historiae Congregationum de Auxiliis Divinae Gratiae of the Congregatio de Auxiliis, and the Dominican-Jesuit controversy on grace that led to its being set up. The work itself is partisan, awarding a Dominican victory based on an unpublished text, but well-documented. It was attacked by the Jesuit Livinus de Meyer, writing as Theodorus Eleutherius, in 1705, in his Historiae controversiarum de divinae gratiae auxiliis.

However, de Meyer's work was itself responded to by Billuart in his Apologie du thomisme triomphant” (Liege, 1731)
