= Hyacinthe Guevremont =

Canadian ice hockey player

- Born: January 22, 1892 Sorel, Quebec, Canada
- Died: July 7, 1964 (aged 72)
- Height: 5 ft 11 in (180 cm)
- Weight: 175 lb (79 kg; 12 st 7 lb)
- Position: Right wing
- Played for: Montreal Canadiens
- Playing career: 1911–1923

Jean Joseph Hyacinthe "Hy" Guèvremont (January 22, 1892 – July 7, 1964) was a Canadian professional ice hockey player. He played with the Montreal Canadiens of the National Hockey Association in the 1912–13 season, appearing in two games.

Guèvremont was married, in 1916, to the writer Germaine Guèvremont.
