= San Jacinto =

San Jacinto is the Spanish form for Święty Jacek (Polish name) or Hyacinth (Latinized name), a man who lived in Europe in the 12th and 13th centuries. The Polish Dominican priest and missionary was canonized by the Catholic Church in 1594. He was one of several men to be called St. Hyacinth. San Jacinto may also refer to:

== Military ==
- Battle of San Jacinto, an 18-minute battle between Mexico and revolutionary Texians across from the mouth of the San Jacinto River of Texas in 1836
- Battle of San Jacinto (1856), between Nicaraguans under José Dolores Estrada and American filibusters
- Battle of San Jacinto (1899), between the United States and Philippine insurgents
- San Jacinto Ordnance Depot, a US Army ammunition depot
- SS San Jacinto (1903), a commercial passenger-cargo ship under United States Army charter during World War I
- USS San Jacinto (1850), an early screw frigate of the U.S. Navy
- USS San Jacinto (CVL-30), a light aircraft carrier that saw action in the latter half of World War II
- USS San Jacinto (CG-56), a guided missile cruiser commissioned in 1988
- San Jacinto Monument, Built in honor of the Battle of San Jacinto, The final battle of the Texas Revolution.

== Places ==
=== United States ===
- San Jacinto, California
- San Jacinto Canyon, former name of Railroad Canyon, California
- San Jacinto Mountains, California
- San Jacinto Peak, California
- San Jacinto River (California)
- San Jacinto Fault Zone, a Southern Californian fault zone
- San Jacinto Valley, California
- San Jacinto, Indiana
- San Jacinto, Nevada
- San Jacinto Monument, Texas
- San Jacinto Plaza, El Paso, Texas
- San Jacinto College, Texas
- San Jacinto County, Texas
- San Jacinto River (Texas)

=== Other countries ===
- San Jacinto, Bolívar, Colombia
- San Jacinto del Cauca, Bolívar, Colombia
- San Jacinto, Chiquimula, Guatemala
- San Jacinto, Comondú, Mexico
- San Jacinto, Lerdo, Mexico
- San Jacinto Amilpas, Oaxaca, Mexico
- San Jacinto Tlacotepec, Oaxaca, Mexico
- San Jacinto, Ancash, Peru
- San Jacinto, Masbate, Philippines
- San Jacinto, Pangasinan, Philippines
- San Jacinto, Uruguay
- San Jacinto, Goa

== Religion ==
- Jacinto Casteñeda of the Vietnamese Martyrs

== Other uses ==
- "San Jacinto", a 1982 song by Peter Gabriel from Peter Gabriel
- San Jacinto Day, a Texas state holiday
- San Jacinto High School (disambiguation)
- USS San Jacinto, a list of ships of the United States Navy

== See also ==
- St. Hyacinth (disambiguation)
