= USS Hyacinth (1862) =

Gunboat of the United States Navy

History

United States
- In service: 1862
- Out of service: 1865
- Fate: Sold, 17 August 1865

General characteristics
- Displacement: 50 tons
- Draft: 6 ft (1.8 m)
- Propulsion: steam engine; screw-propelled
- Speed: 8 knots (15 km/h; 9.2 mph)
- Armament: one gun

USS Hyacinth was a steamer acquired by the Union during the American Civil War. She was placed into service as a tugboat, a dispatch boat, as well as a gunboat, by the Union Army and by the Union Navy.

== Service history ==
Hyacinth was a tug used by the Union Army under the name Spitfire on the upper Mississippi River in 1862. She was used to carry dispatches during the Battle of Island Number Ten in March 1862. She captured Confederate transport Sovereign near Fort Pillow, Tennessee, 5 June 1862; and 9 days later, took steamer Clara Dolsen after a long chase from Helena, Arkansas, ending on the White River a short distance above its mouth.

Spitfire was transferred by the U.S. War Department to the Union Navy 30 September 1862, and renamed Hyacinth 19 October. Hyacinth served the Mississippi Squadron until the end of the war. She was especially useful in operations which resulted in the fall of Vicksburg, and assisted in the salvage work which refloated Indianola.

She was sold at public auction at Mound City, Illinois, to A. T. Paine 17 August 1865.
