= Protus and Hyacinth =

Christian martyrs

Saints Protus and Hyacinth
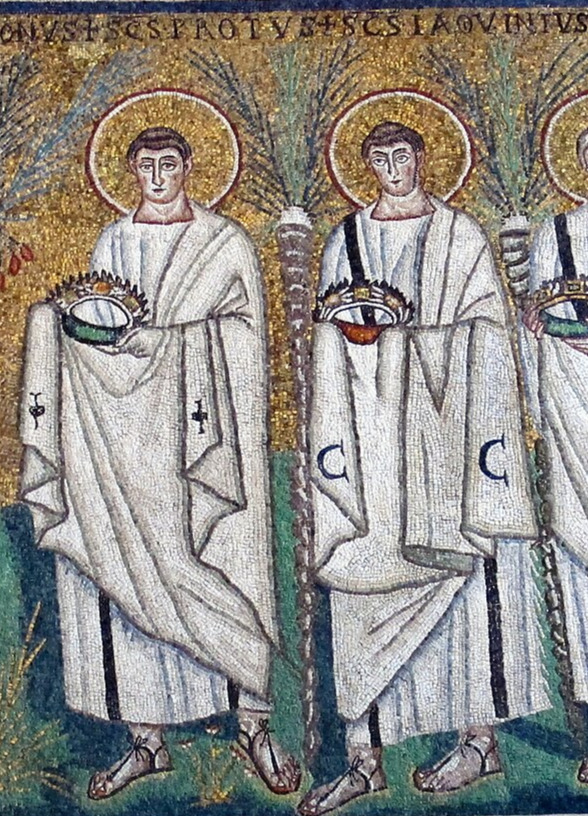
- Mosaic from the Basilica di Sant'Apollinare Nuovo

Martyrs
- Born: 3rd century
- Died: c. 257–9; Rome
- Venerated in: Catholic Church, Coptic Orthodox Church and Eastern Orthodox Church
- Major shrine: San Giovanni dei Fiorentini, as well as the chapel of the Propaganda College. Both in Rome.
- Feast: September 11 (Roman Catholic Church), December 24 (Byzantine Catholic and Eastern Orthodox Churches)
- Attributes: Depicted as two young men, holding the crowns of martyrdom

Saints Protus and Hyacinth were Christian martyrs during the persecution of Emperor Valerian (257–259 AD). Protus' name is sometimes spelled Protatius, Proteus, Prothus, Prote, and Proto. His name was corrupted in England as Saint Pratt. Hyacinth is sometimes called by his Latin name Hyacinthus (in French: Hyacinthe; Spanish: Jacinto; and Italian: Giacinto). The day of their annual commemoration is mentioned in the "Depositio Martyrum" on September 11, in the Chronograph of 354.

== Tradition ==
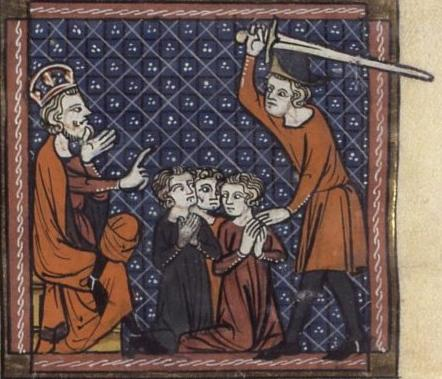
The saints' martyrdom in a 14th-century manuscript.

The earliest account of their lives is a Passion of the Martyr Saints Protus and Hyacinth (BHL 2667). Novel-like in composition, it was written in Latin in Italy between 450 and 499. This states that they served as eunuch chamberlains to Saint Eugenia, and were baptized along with her by Helenus, Bishop of Heliopolis. Devoting themselves zealously to the study of sacred scripture, they lived with the hermits of Egypt and later accompanied Eugenia to Rome. There, they were arrested for their Christianity by Emperor Gallienus (260–268). Refusing to deny their faith, they were first scourged and then beheaded on 11 September 258. That Passion is now thought to be a novelistic creation to create a hagiography for two saints for whom none was yet known and to link them to Eugenia, thought to be fictitious.

Pope Damasus I wrote an epitaph in honor of the two martyrs, part of which still exists, in which he calls Protus and Hyacinth "brothers".

== Graves ==
The Chronograph of 354 mentions that they were buried together in the coemeterium of Basilla on the Via Salaria, later the Catacomb of Sant'Ermete. The "Itineraries" and other early authorities likewise give this as their place of burial. When Pope Leo IV (847–855) transferred the bones of many Roman martyrs to the churches of Rome, the relics of these two saints were to be translated also; but, probably on account of the devastation of the burial chamber, only the grave of St. Protus was found at that time and his remains transferred to San Salvatore on the Palatine Hill.

In 1845, Father Giuseppe Marchi discovered the still undisturbed grave of St. Hyacinth in a crypt of the same catacomb. It was a small square niche in which lay the ashes and pieces of burned bone (many martyrdoms at that time were by fire) wrapped in the remains of costly stuffs. The niche was closed by a marble slab similar to that used to close a loculus, and bearing the original Latin inscription that confirmed the date in the old Roman Martyrology:

D P III IDUS SEPTEBR

YACINTHUS

MARTYR

(Buried on 11 September Hyacinthus Martyr).

In the same chamber were found fragments of an architrave belonging to some later decoration, with the words:

. . . S E P U L C R U M P R O T I M(artyris) . . .

(Grave of the Martyr Protus)

This proved that both martyrs had originally been buried in the same crypt. In June 1933 Hyacinth's remains were placed in the chapel of the Propaganda College. Later, the tombs of the two saints and a stairway built at the end of the fourth century were discovered and restored.

== Cult in England ==
St Protus and St Hyacinth's Church, Blisland in Cornwall was dedicated to Saint Protus. It is known locally as St Pratts.
