= Jason (given name) =

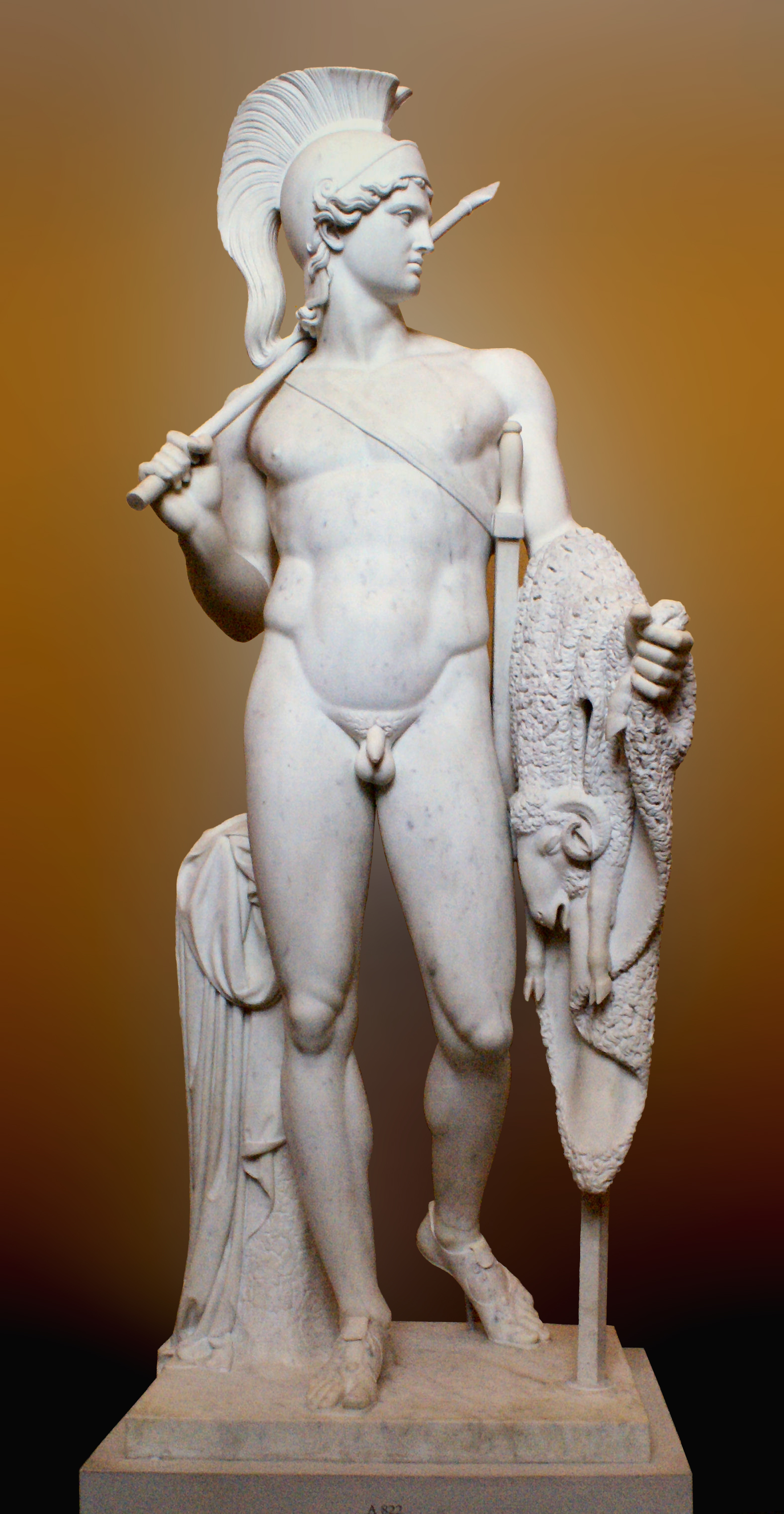
- Sculpture of Jason by Bertel Thorvaldsen
- Pronunciation: English: /ˈdʒeɪsən/ JAY-sən; French: [ʒazɔ̃]
- Gender: Male

Origin
- Origin: Greek
- Meaning: "Healer"

Other names
- Variant forms: Jaeson, Jaison, Jayson, Jacyn, Jacin, Jasen
- Nicknames: Jay, Jase, Jace, Jake
- Related names: Jacin, Jasen, Jasão, Jayceon

Jason is a common masculine given name. It comes from Greek Ἰάσων (Iásōn), meaning "healer", from the verb ἰάομαι (iáomai), "heal", "cure", cognate with ἰατρός (iatrós), "healer", "physician". and Ἰασώ (Iasṓ), the goddess of healing, Forms of related words have been attested in Greek from as far back as Mycenaen (in Linear B) and Arcadocypriot (in the Cypriot syllabary) Greek: 𐀂𐀊𐀳, i-ja-te and i-ja-te-ra-ne, respectively, both regarded as standing for inflected forms of ἰατήρ, "healer".

The name was borne in Greek mythology by Jason, the great Thessalian hero who led the Argonauts in the quest for the Golden Fleece. The name is also found in the Bible. The house of a man named Jason was used as a refuge by the apostle Paul and Silas.

The name's adoption in the United Kingdom peaked during the 1970s, when it was among the top 20 male names, but it had fallen out of the top 100 by 2003. Jason is the most common spelling; however, there are many variant spellings such as Jayson, Jacyn, Jaeson, Jaison, and Jasen. Common diminutives of Jason are Jay and Jace.

A feminine name that sounds identical is Jacin, derived from the Portuguese-Spanish name Jacinta or the Anglicized version Jacinda, meaning hyacinth.

== People ==
=== Ancient world ===
- Jason (high priest) (2nd century BCE), High Priest of Jerusalem
- Jason the Martyr (3rd century), saint and martyr
- Jason of Cyrene (circa 100 BCE), Jewish historian
- Jason of Nysa (circa 100 BCE), Stoic philosopher
- Jason of Pherae (died 370 BCE), King of Thessaly
- Jason of Thessalonica, a saint numbered among the 72 Apostles, mentioned in the Bible

=== Modern world ===
- Jason Abalos (born 1985), Filipino actor
- Jason Akermanis (born 1977), Australian rules footballer
- Jason Aldean (born 1977), American country singer
- Jason Alexander (disambiguation), multiple people
- Jason Ankrah (born 1991), American football player
- Jason Arday (1985–2026), British academic and author
- Jason Bateman (born 1969), American television and film actor
- Jason Baumgartner, American electrical engineer
- Jason Beaulieu (born 1994), Canadian soccer player
- Jason Benjamin (1971–2021), Australian artist
- Jason Berger (1924–2010), American painter
- Jason Bergmann (born 1981), American baseball player
- Jason Bernard (1938–1996), American actor
- Jason Berry (born 1949), American journalist
- Jason Biggs (born 1978), American actor
- Jason Black (born 1972), American retired mixed martial artist
- Jason Black (musician) of American punk rock band Hot Water Music
- Jason L Blair, American writer and game designer
- Jason Lyle Black, American pianist and composer
- Jason Blum (born 1969), American producer
- Jason Boe (1929–1990), American politician
- Jason Bohm, U.S Marine Corps major general
- Jason Bohn (born 1973), American golfer
- Jason Bond, American biologist
- Jason Bonham (born 1966), English drummer, son of Led Zeppelin drummer John Bonham
- Jason W. Briggs (1821–1899), American leader of the Latter Day Saint movement
- Jason Brown (disambiguation)
- Jason Brownlee (born 1999), American football player
- Jason Cabinda (born 1996), American football player
- Jason Carter (disambiguation)
  - Jason Carter (actor) (born 1960) English actor
- Jason Castro (baseball) (born 1987), American baseball player
- Jason Castro (singer) (born 1987), American singer and musician
- Jason Chambers (born 1980), American mixed martial arts fighter
- Jason Chan (disambiguation)
- Jason Chorak (born 1974), American football player
- Jason Christopher (born 1971), American musician
- Jason Clark (disambiguation)
- Jason Clarke (born 1969), Australian actor
- Jason Clarke (writer) (born 1978), American writer and web developer
- Jason Collier (1977–2005), American basketball player
- Jason Collins (1978–2026), American basketball player
- Jason Connery (born 1963), English actor
- Jason Conti (1975–2025), American baseball player
- Jason Costa (born 1972), American musician
- Jason Crabb (born 1977), American gospel singer
- Jason Crow, American politician
- Jason Crowe (born 1978), English footballer
- Jason Crowe (basketball) (born 1976), American basketball player
- Jason Crumb (born 1973), Canadian football player
- Jason Crump (born 1975), Australian motorcycle speedway rider
- Jason Cundy (born 1969), English association footballer and broadcaster
- Jason Da Costa, English aerospace technology autodidact
- Jason Daly, Westmeath Gaelic footballer
- Jason Danino-Holt (born 1987), Israeli actor and TV presenter
- Jason Davis (born 1973), also known as Jabba (presenter), Australian actor and TV presenter
- Jason Dawe (ice hockey) (born 1973), Canadian ice hockey player
- Jason Dawe (presenter) (born 1967), English journalist and TV presenter
- Jason Day (disambiguation)
- Jason Demers (born 1988), Canadian ice hockey player
- Jason Derulo (born 1989), American singer
- Jason Donovan (born 1968), Australian actor and singer
- Jason Dooley (born 1971), American drummer
- Jason Dottley (born 1980) American actor and singer
- Jason Downer (1813–1883), American judge in Wisconsin
- Jason Drucker (born 2005), American child actor
- Jason Dunstall (born 1964), Australian rules footballer
- Jason Dy (born 1990), Filipino singer and songwriter
- Jason Earles (born 1977), American actor and comedian
- Jason Eckardt (born 1971), American composer
- Jason Ellis (born 1971), Australian radio show host and former professional skateboarder
- Jason Ellis (basketball) (born 1982), American retired basketball player
- Jason Ellsworth, American politician
- Jason Epstein (1928–2022) American editor
- Jason Fairbanks (1780–1801), American murderer
- Jason Farradane (1906–1989), British librarian and pioneer in Information science
- Jason Forbach, American actor, singer, playwright and filmmaker
- Jason Forbes (born 1990), British actor, writer, comedian, impressionist, and TV presenter
- Jason Francisco (born 1987), Filipino actor and comedian
- Jason David Frank (1973–2022), American actor and MMA fighter
- Jason Garrett (born 1966), American football coach and player
- Jason Geria (born 1993), Australian football player
- Jason Giambi (born 1971), American professional baseball player
- Jason Gilkison, Australian choreographer and dancer
- Jay Gould (1836–1892), American railroad magnate
- Jason Griffith (born 1980), American actor and voice actor
- Jason Hall (disambiguation)
- Jason E. Hammond (1862–1957), American educator and politician
- Jason Harshbarger (born 1974), American politician
- Jason Haven (1733–1803), American minister
- Jason Healey, American researcher and scholar
- Jason Heaser, American politician
- Jason Henderson, American comic writer and novelist
- Jason Henderson (American football) (born 2001), American football player
- Jason Hickel (born 1982), anthropologist and professor
- Jason Holder (born 1991), Barbados and West Indies cricketer
- Jason Holt (born 1993), Scottish footballer
- Jason Holt (businessman) (born 1969), British businessman
- Jason Horton (born 1980), American football player
- Jason Hughes (disambiguation)
- Jason Huntley (born 1998), American football player
- Jason Hyland, American former Acting United States Ambassador to Japan
- Jason Todd Ipson (born 1972), American director, screenwriter, producer, fashion photographer and surgeon
- Jason Isaacs (born 1963), English actor
- Jason Kander (born 1981), American politician
- Jason Kapono (born 1981), American basketball player
- Jason Katims (born 1960), American TV writer
- Jason Kelce (born 1987), American football player
- Jason Kennedy (footballer) (born 1986), English association football player
- Jason Kennedy (TV personality) (born 1981), American television personality
- Jason Kidd (born 1973), American basketball player and coach
- Jason Killeen (born 1985), Irish basketball player
- Jason King (disambiguation)
- Jason Kingdon, English entrepreneur
- Jason Knight (disambiguation)
- Jason Kouchak, French musician and composer
- Jason Brook Kanarr (1971–2006), American actor and model
- Jason C. Kovacic (born 1968), Australian cardiologist
- Jason Kralt (born 1974), Canadian football player
- Jason Lai (born 1974), British orchestral conductor
- Jason Lamar (born 1978), American football player
- Jason Lee (disambiguation)
- Jason Leonard (born 1968), England international rugby union player
- Jason Lewis (disambiguation)
- Jason London (born 1972), American actor
- Jason Lowndes (1994–2017), Australian cyclist
- Jason Lytle (born 1969), American musician
- Jason Maguire (born 1980), Irish horse racing jockey
- Jason Mantzoukas (born 1972), American actor and comedian
- Jason Marsden (born 1975), American actor
- Jason Martin-Smith (1972–2001), English murder victim
- Jason Marquis (born 1978), American baseball player
- Jason Matheson (born 1974), American television and radio host
- Jason McCartney (disambiguation)
- Jason McGill (born 1966), English football chairman
- Jason McManus (1934–2019) American journalist
- Jason Mewes (born 1974), American actor
- Jason Micklefield, English Biochemist and professor of Chemistry
- Jason Miles (born 1951), American composer
- Jason Charles Miller (born 1972) American musician
- Jason Mohan (born 1979), stage name Jay Mo, English musician and filmmaker
- Jason Molins (born 1974), Irish cricketer
- Jason Momoa (born 1979), American actor
- Jason Moore (disambiguation)
- W. Jason Morgan (1935–2023), American geophysicist
- Jason Mraz (born 1977), American singer-songwriter
- Jason Nash (born 1973), American actor, writer, director, comedian, podcaster, and YouTuber
- Jason John Nassau (1893–1965) American astronomer
- Jason Nemes (born 1978), American politician
- Jason Nikas (1972–2023), American actor, model, and production designer
- Jason Newsted (born 1963), American bass player, member of the band Metallica
- Jason Ng (triathlete) (born 2000), triathlete from Hong Kong
- Jason Hiu Lui Ng (c. 1975–2008), New Yorker who died while in the custody of United States Immigration and Customs Enforcement
- Jason Nicolle (born 1965), English squash player
- Jason O'Connell, Welsh politician
- Jason Okundaye (born 1997), British writer
- Jason Manuel Olazabal (born 1973), American actor
- Jason Onye (born 2002), American football player
- Jason Orange (born 1970), English musician, member of the band Take That
- Jason Parent, American politician
- Jason Pargin (born (1975), American novelist and humorist
- Jason B. Parrish (1878–1906), American football player and coach
- Jason Pearce (born 1987), English footballer
- Jason Petta (born 1975), American physicist
- Jason Pinnock (born 1999), American football player
- Jason Pratensis (1486–1558), Dutch neurologist and poet
- Jason Presson (born 1971), American actor
- Jason Preston (born 1999), American basketball player
- Jason Priestley (born 1969), Canadian actor
- Jason Ralph (footballer) (1872–1952), Australian rules footballer
- Jason Reynolds, American novelist
- Jason Richardson (disambiguation)
- Jason Ritter (born 1980), American actor
- Jason Robards (1922–2000), American actor
- Jason Robards Sr. (1892–1963), American actor
- Jason Rogers (publisher) (1868–1932), American publisher
- Jason Rosener (born 1975), American alpine skier
- Jason Rosenfield (born 1945), American film director and editor
- Jason Roy (born 1990), English cricket player
- Jason Russell (1716–1775), American whose home was the site of a battle in the American Revolutionary War
- Jason Sanders (born 1995), American football player
- Jason Sandholdt, American politician
- Jason Sangha, Australian-Indian cricket player
- Jason Sapan (born 1950), American holographer
- Jason M. Saunderson (1886–1950), Canadian-born American college football, basketball and baseball head coach
- Jason Scheff (born 1962), American musician, member of the band Chicago
- Jason Schmidt (born 1973), American baseball player
- Jason Schmidt (photographer) (born 1969), American photographer
- Jason Schwartzman (born 1980), American actor and musician
- Jason Scott (disambiguation)
  - Jason Scott (born 1970), American archivist and historian of technology
  - Jason Scott (rower) (born 1970), American Olympic rower
- Jason Seife (born 1989), American visual artist and painter
- Jason Segel (born 1980), American actor
- Jason Sherer, American politician
- Jason Sherlock (born 1976), Dublin Gaelic footballer
- Jason Siggers (born 1985), American basketball player in the Israel Basketball Premier League
- Jason Smith (disambiguation)
- Jason Smogorzewski (1717–1779), Bishop of Ruthenia
- Jason Spencer (born 1974), American politician and physician assistant
- Jason Spezza (born 1983), Canadian ice hockey player
- Jason Statham (born 1967), English actor
- Jason Steffen (born 1975), American astrophysicist
- Jason Strevell (1832–1903), American lawyer
- Jason Strowbridge (born 1996), American football player
- Jason Stuart (born 1969), American actor and comedian
- Jason Sudeikis (born 1975), American actor and comedian
- Jason Richard Swallen (1903–1991), American botanist
- Jason Tarry (born 1966/67), British retail executive
- Jason Taylor (disambiguation)
- Jason Terry (born 1977), American basketball player
- Jason Van Hollander (born 1949), American illustrator
- Jason Vargas (born 1983), American baseball pitcher
- Jason Varitek (born 1972), American baseball catcher
- Jason Verduzco (born 1970), American football player
- Jason Wade (born 1980), American musician, member of the band Lifehouse
- Jason Walters (born 1985), Dutchman sentenced to prison for Islamic terrorism
- Jason Washington (born 1979), American football coach
- Jason Watkins (disambiguation)
- Jason Watson (footballer) (born 1991), Jamaican footballer
- Jason Watson (jockey) (born 2000), English jockey
- Jason Westrol (born 1988), American basketball player
- Jason Whitaker (born 1977), American football player
- Jason White (disambiguation)
- Jason Williams (basketball, born 1975) (born 1975), American NBA basketball player
- Jason Williams (basketball, born 1983) (born 1983), American international basketball player
- Jason Wilsher-Mills (born 1969) English artist
- Jason Wingreen (1920–2015), American actor
- Jason Winston George (born 1972), American actor
- Jason Wright (born 1982), American football player, businessman, and executive
- Jason F. Wright (born 1971), American author and speaker
- Jason Young (born 1980), Thai actor and singer
- Jason Yuan (born 1942), Taiwanese politician and diplomat
- Jason Zimmerman (born 1989), American professional Esports player, known as 'Mew2King'
- Jason Zucker (born 1992), American ice hockey player

== Fictional characters ==
- Jason Blood, a DC Comics character
- Jason Bourne, protagonist of Robert Ludlum's novels and their film adaptations
- Jason Costello, in soap opera Hollyoaks
- Jason Cramer, in the television series Oz
- Jason Grimshaw, from the soap opera Coronation Street
- Jason King, in the TV series Department S and Jason King
- Jason Mendoza, a principal character in the television series The Good Place
- Jason Morgan from General Hospital
- Jason Lee Scott, the first Red Ranger and later the Golden Ranger in the Power Rangers franchise
- Jason Rusch, the second Firestorm from DC Comics
- Jason Stackhouse, in The Southern Vampire Mysteries series by Charlaine Harris
- Jason Street, on the TV series Friday Night Lights
- Jason Todd, the second Robin in Batman comics, later revived as Red Hood
- Jason Voorhees, main antagonist of the Friday the 13th horror film franchise, first appearing in 1980

== See also ==
- Giasone del Maino (1435–1519), Italian jurist
- Giason Denores (1530–1590), Italian Renaissance philosopher
