= Jayson =

Jayson is a masculine given name. Notable people with the name include:

== A ==
- Jayson Adair (born 1969/1970), American businessman
- Jayson P. Ahern, American civil servant
- Jayson Aquino (born 1992), Dominican baseball player

== B ==
- Jayson Biacan (born 1979), American former journalist
- Jayson Blair (actor) (born 1984), American actor
- Jayson Breitenbach (born 1998), German footballer
- Jayson Bukuya (born 1989), Fijian rugby league player

== C ==
- Jayson Castro (born 1986), Filipino basketball player

== D ==
- Jayson Daniels (born 1971), Australian rules footballer
- Jayson Dénommée (born 1977), Canadian figure skater
- Jayson DiManche (born 1990), Haitian-American football player
- Jayson Durocher (born 1974), American baseball player

== F ==
- Jayson Foster (born 1985), American football player

== G ==
- Jayson Gaignard, Canadian entrepreneur
- Jayson Gee (born 1965), American basketball coach
- Jayson Gillham (born 1986), Australian pianist
- Jayson Gonzales (born 1969), Filipino chess grandmaster
- Jayson Granger (born 1989), Uruguayan basketball player
- Jayson Greene (born 1981/1982), American author

== H ==
- Jayson Lee Hanna (born 1975), British actor
- Jayson Hale (born 1985), American snowboarder
- Jayson Hinder (1965–2017), Australian lawyer and politician

== J ==
- Jayson Jablonsky (born 1985), American volleyball player
- Jayson Jones (born 1977), German-Belizean runner

== K ==
- Jayson Keeling (born 1966), American artist
- Jayson King, American baseball coach

== L ==
- Jayson Leutwiler (born 1989), Swiss footballer
- Jayson Lilley (born 1972), British artist
- ManvsGame, American entertainer
- Jayson Lusk (born 1974), American economist

== M ==
- Jayson Megna (born 1990), American ice hockey player
- Jayson Mena (born 1992), Chilean footballer
- Jayson Molumby (born 1999), Irish footballer
- Jayson More (born 1969), Canadian ice hockey player
- Jayson Musson (born 1977), American artist

== N ==
- Jayson Nix (born 1982), American baseball player

== O ==
- Jayson Obazuaye (born 1984), Nigerian basketball player

== P ==
- Jayson Palmgren (born 1989), American football player
- Jayson Papeau (born 1996), French footballer
- Jayson Patino (born 1983), American Jiu Jitsu practitioner
- Jayson Potroz (born 1991), New Zealand rugby union footballer

== R ==
- Jayson Rego, American rugby league footballer

== S ==
- Jayson Shaw (born 1988), Scottish pool player
- Jayson Sherlock (born 1970), Australian drummer
- Jayson Warner Smith (born 1985), American actor
- Jayson Stanley (born 1997), American football player
- Jayson Stark (born 1951), American sportswriter
- Jayson Swain (born 1984), American football player

== T ==
- Jayson Tatum (born 1998), American basketball player
- Jayson Terdiman (born 1988), American luger
- Jayson Thiessen (born 1976), Canadian animator
- Jayson Timatua (born 1998), Vanuatuan footballer
- Jayson Trommel (born 1982), Dutch footballer

== U ==
- Jayson Uribe (born 1999), American motorcycle racer

== V ==
- Jayson Vélez (born 1988), Puerto Rican boxer

== W ==
- Jayson Wells (born 1976), American basketball player
- Jayson Werth (born 1979), American baseball player
- Jayson Williams (born 1968), American basketball player

== See also ==
- Jason (given name), people with the given name "Jason"
