= Neurophysiology =

Study of neural function

Neurophysiology is a branch of physiology and neuroscience concerned with the functions of the nervous system and their mechanisms. The term neurophysiology originates from the Greek word νεῦρον ("nerve") and physiology (which is, in turn, derived from the Greek φύσις, meaning "nature", and -λογία, meaning "knowledge"). Neurophysiology has applications in the prevention, diagnosis, and treatment of many neurological and psychiatric diseases. Neurophysiological techniques are also used by clinical neurophysiologists to diagnose and monitor patients with neurological diseases.

The field involves all levels of nervous system function, from molecules and cells to systems and whole organisms. Areas of study include:

- The electrochemical properties of neurons
- Function and regulation of proteins in neurons and glia
- Metabolic reactions relevant to neural function
- Cell signalling in the nervous system
- Neurotransmission and synaptic plasticity
- Neural circuitry at microscopic and macroscopic levels
- The impact of neural functions on cognition and behaviour
- Pathophysiology of neurological and psychiatric disorders

Experimental neurophysiologists use many techniques to study neural function. Electrophysiological techniques like electroencephalography (EEG), single cell recording, and extracellular recording of local field potentials are especially common. Multi-electrode arrays on semiconductor chips can perform in vitro extracellular recording and in vitro intracellular recording at scale. Magnetoencephalography is sometimes used in place of EEG. Immunohistochemistry, cell staining, in situ hybridisation, calcium imaging, and transmission electron microscopy are used to study cellular activity in the nervous system. Genetic engineering techniques may be used to study the impact of specific genes on neural functions. Pharmacological methods are used investigate the function of specific receptors in neurons and glia. Optogenetics and chemogenetics allow specific activation of neurons to study their functions. Functional magnetic resonance imaging and positron emission tomography can be used to measure metabolic changes in the brain. Finally, behavioural analysis is used to understand interactions between physiology and behaviour. Contemporary neurophysiology experiments often use multiple techniques together to develop a more complete understanding of their research areas.

== History ==
=== Antiquity ===
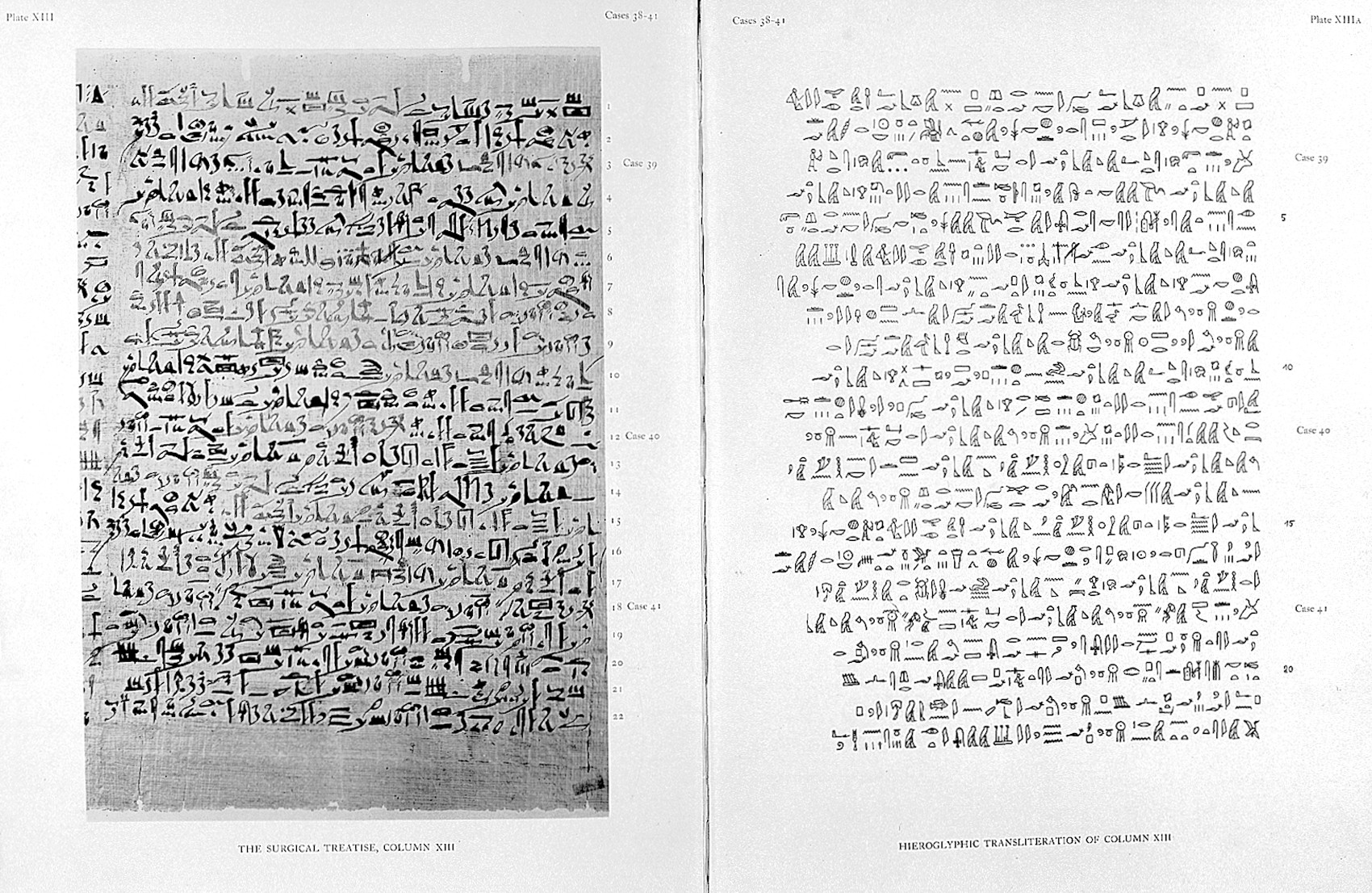
The Breasted edition (1930): left page photograph of the original Edwin Smith papyrus, right page transcription of hieroglyphics. This is Plate XIII (column 13, case 38-41)

Neurophysiology has been a subject of study since as early as 4,000 B.C. In the early B.C. years, most studies were of different natural sedatives like alcohol and poppy plants. In 1700 B.C., the Edwin Smith surgical papyrus was written. This papyrus was crucial in understanding how the ancient Egyptians understood the nervous system. This papyrus looked at different case studies about injuries to different parts of the body, most notably the head. The knowledge presents a rational and scientific approach to medicine in ancient Egypt. Beginning around 460 B.C., Hippocrates began to study epilepsy, and theorized that it had its origins in the brain. Hippocrates also theorized that the brain was involved in sensation, and that it was where intelligence was derived from. Hippocrates, as well as most ancient Greeks, believed that relaxation and a stress free environment was crucial in helping treat neurological disorders, that "healthy Mediterranean diet and daily moderate physical activity can prevent disease". In 280 B.C., Erasistratus of Chios theorized that there were divisions in vestibular processing in the brain, as well as deducing from observation that sensation was located there.

In 177 C.E. Galen theorized that human thought occurred in the brain, as opposed to the heart as Aristotle had theorized. The optic chiasm, which is crucial to the visual system, was discovered around 100 C.E. by Marinus.

=== Middle ages ===
Abū Bakr al-Rāzī (864 or 865–925 or 935 C.E.), also known by his Latin name Rhazes, a Persian physician, philosopher, and alchemist, wrote a book for al-Mansur (Kitāb al-Manṣūrī) of 26 sections on body structures, including nerves, muscles, and organs such as the eyes and heart. It was translated into Latin by Gerard of Cremona around 1180. c. 1000, Al-Zahrawi, living in Iberia, began to write about different surgical treatments for neurological disorders. He described a surgical procedure for treating such a neurological disease as migraine (in particular, ligation of the temporal artery for migraine), in his thirty-volume medical encyclopedia, the Kitab al-Tasrif manuscript, completed in the year 1000. Al-Zahrawi was first to discover the root cause of paralysis. In Persia, Avicenna (Ibn-Sina) presented detailed knowledge about skull fractures and their surgical treatments. In 1216, the first anatomy textbook in Europe, which included a description of the brain, was written by Mondino de Luzzi. In 1402, St Mary of Bethlehem Hospital (later known as Bedlam in Britain) was the first hospital used exclusively for the mentally ill.

=== 16th century ===
In 1504, Leonardo da Vinci continued his study of the human body with a wax cast of the human ventricle system. In 1536, Nicolo Massa described the effects of different diseases, such as syphilis on the nervous system. He also noticed that the ventricular cavities were filled with cerebrospinal fluid. In 1542, the term physiology was used for the first time by a French physician named Jean Fernel, to explain bodily function in relation to the brain.

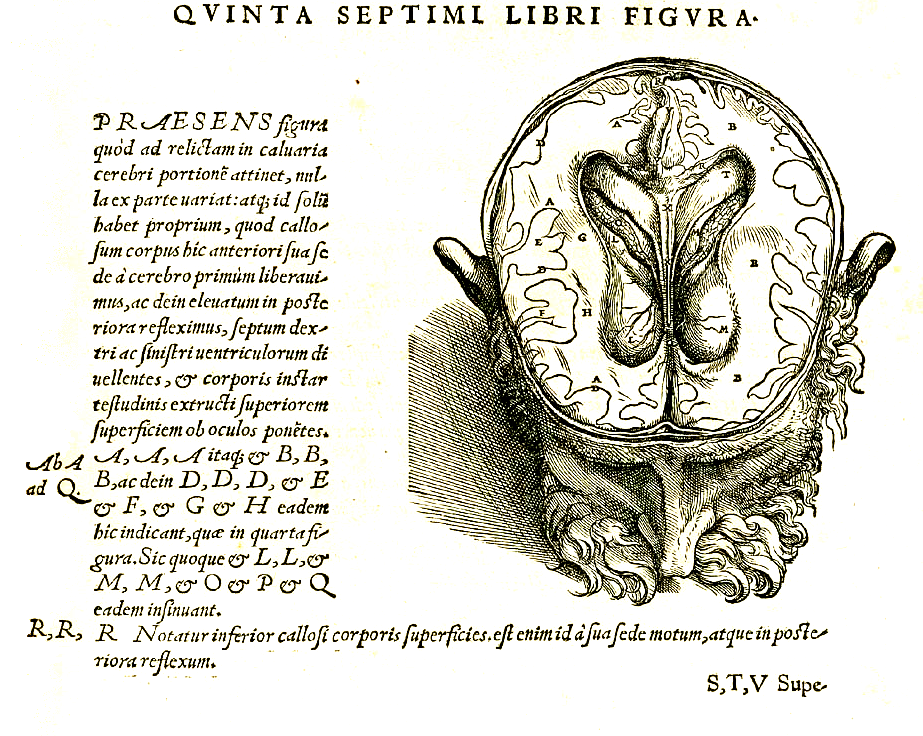
Vesalius arranged his work into seven books. Vesalius' De humani corporis fabrica, Book 7: The Brain, figure on plate 609, contrasted.

In 1543, Andreas Vesalius wrote De humani corporis fabrica, which revolutionized the study of anatomy. The book 7 of this corpus described the structure and functions of the brain and its coverings, the eye, the organs of sensation, and the nerves of the limbs. In this book, he described the pineal gland and what he believed the function was, and was able to draw the corpus striatum which is made up of the basal ganglia and the internal capsule. It was closed with a chapter on the correct way to dissect the brain. In 1549, Jason Pratensis published De Cerebri Morbis. This book was devoted to neurological diseases, and discussed symptoms, as well as ideas from Galen and other Greek, Roman and Arabic authors. It also looked into the anatomy and specific functions of different areas. In 1550, Andreas Vesalius worked on a case of hydrocephalus, or fluid filling the brain. In the same year, Bartolomeo Eustachi studied the optic nerve, mainly focusing on its origin in the brain. In 1564, Giulio Cesare Aranzio discovered the hippocampus, naming it such due to its shape resemblance to a sea horse.

=== 17th century ===
In 1621, Robert Burton published The Anatomy of Melancholy, which looked at the loss of important characters in one's life as leading to depression. In 1649, René Descartes studied the pineal gland. He mistakenly believed that it was the "soul" of the brain, and believed it was where thoughts formed. In 1658, Johann Jakob Wepfer studied a patient in which he believed that a broken blood vessel had caused apoplexy, or a stroke. The European Stroke Conference has awarded the Wepfer Prize for stroke research annually since 2005. In 1664, Thomas Willis published his Anatomy of the Brain. He described the brain more clearly, setting forth the circle of Willis, the circle of vessels that enables arterial supply of the brain. He described epilepsy, apoplexy, and paralysis.

=== 18th century ===
In 1749, David Hartley published Observations on Man, which focused on frame (neurology), duty (moral psychology) and expectations (spirituality) and how these integrated within one another. This text was also the first to use the English term psychology. In 1752, the Society of Friends created an asylum in Philadelphia, Pennsylvania. The asylum intended to give not only medical treatment to those mentally ill, but also provide with caretakers and comfortable living conditions. In 1755, Jean-Baptiste Le Roy began using electroconvulsive therapy for the mentally ill, a treatment still used today in specific cases. In 1760, Arne-Charles studied how different lesions in the cerebellum could affect motor movements. In 1776, Vincenzo Malacarne studied the cerebellum intensely, and published a book solely based on its function and appearance.

In 1784, Félix Vicq-d'Azyr, discovered a black colored structure in the midbrain. In 1791 Samuel Thomas von Sömmerring alluded to this structure, calling it the substantia nigra. In the same year, Luigi Galvani described the role of electricity in nerves of dissected frogs.

=== 19th century ===
In 1808, Franz Joseph Gall studied and published work on phrenology. Phrenology was the faulty science of looking at head shape to determine different aspects of personality and brain function. In 1811, Julien Jean César Legallois studied respiration in animal dissection and lesions and found the center of respiration in the medulla oblongata. In the same year, Charles Bell finished work on what would later become known as the Bell–Magendie law, which compared functional differences between dorsal and ventral roots of the spinal cord. He was the first to distinguish between motor and sensory nerves and proposed the concept of a “muscle sense”. In 1822, Karl Friedrich Burdach distinguished between the lateral and medial geniculate bodies, as well as named the cingulate gyrus. The column of Burdach or fasciculus cuneatus, the lateral portion of the dorsal funiculus of the spinal cord is named for him. In 1824, F. Magendie studied and produced the first evidence of the cerebellum's role in equilibration to complete the Bell–Magendie law.

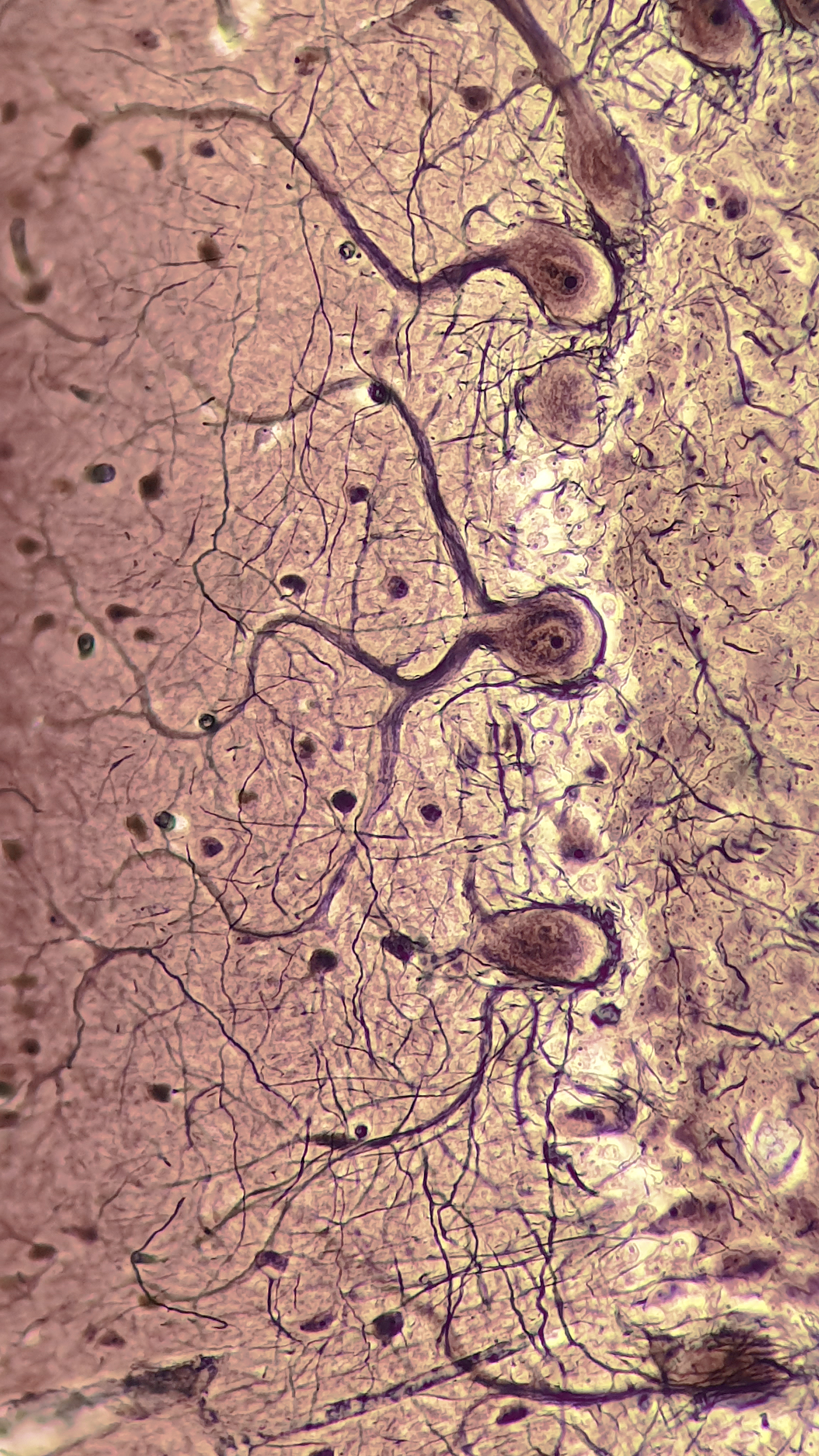
Neurons (Purkinje cells) located in the cerebellum

Scientific knowledge of the functions of the nervous system and their mechanisms was expanded by the discovery in 1837 of Purkinje cells (or Purkinje neurons), named after the Czech physiologist Jan Evangelist Purkyně. These large neurons in the cerebellar cortex play a key role in regulating motor activity. The discovery settled the debate over whether the brain is composed of cells like all other tissues. In 1838, Theodor Schwann began studying white and grey matter in the brain, and discovered the myelin sheath. These cells, which cover the axons of the neurons in the brain, are named Schwann cells after him. In 1843 Carlo Matteucci and Emil du Bois-Reymond demonstrated that nerves transmit signals electrically.

The Phineas Gage case: The left frontal lobe (red), with Ratiu et al.'s estimate of the iron's path

In 1848, Phineas Gage, the classical neurophysiology patient, had his brain pierced by an iron tamping rod in a blasting accident. He became an excellent case study in the connection between the prefrontal cortex and behavior, decision making and consequences. In 1849, Hermann von Helmholtz studied the speed of frog nerve impulses while studying electricity in the body.

In 1861, French neurologist Paul Broca discovered that a damaged area of the posterior inferior frontal gyrus also known as Broca's area) in patients caused an inability to speak.

Italian neuroanatomist professor Camillo Golgi discovered in the 1870s that all the nerve cells in the nervous system are a continuous, interconnected network.

Regionally specific features of the central brain region were described by Prof. Betz in 1874, making one of the first steps toward the microstructural, cytoarchitectonic parcellation of the entire human cerebral cortex.

In 1875, Prof. Richard Caton reported to the British Medical Association that he had observed electrical impulses from the surfaces of living brains in animals.

In 1894, neurologist and psychiatrist Edward Flatau published a human brain atlas “Atlas of the Human Brain and the Course of the Nerve-Fibres”.

In 1896, Prof. d'Arsonval conducted the first documented study of the effects of a time-variable magnetic field on the brain, producing physiological changes: a volunteer reported phosphenes and vertigo when a coil stimulated his head at 42 Hz.

=== 20th century ===
In 1902, Prof. Julius Bernstein contributed to the physiology of nerve impulses by proposing that the action potential results from a change in the permeability of the axonal membrane to ions, thereby providing knowledge of the origin of the "resting potential" and the "action potential" in the nerve. The "membrane hypothesis" explained the resting potential of nerve and muscle as a diffusion potential set up by the tendency of positively charged ions to diffuse from their high concentration in cytoplasm to their low concentration in the extracellular solution, while other ions are held back. Bernstein was also the first to introduce the Nernst equation for resting potential across the membrane.

In 1907, Prof. Louis Lapicque proposed that the action potential occurs at threshold crossing[39] (later better shown to be a product of dynamic ionic conduction systems).

Brodmann's diagram of the cerebral cortex with the areas he identified

In 1909, German anatomist Korbinian Brodmann published his original research on brain mapping, defining 52 distinct regions of the cerebral cortex, known as Brodmann areas now.

In 1924, German physiologist and psychiatrist Hans Berger (1873–1941) discovered the electrical activity of the brain (called brain waves) and, in particular, the alpha wave rhythm, which is a type of brain wave.

A great deal of study on sensory organs and the function of nerve cells was conducted by British physiologist Edgar Adrian. In 1928, he observed nerve fibers in action during his experiments on frogs, and was able to record the electrical discharge of single nerve fibres under physical stimulus. He concluded that the excitation of the skin under constant stimulus is initially strong but gradually decreases over time, whereas the sensory impulses passing along the nerves from the point of contact are constant in strength, yet are reduced in frequency over time, and the sensation in the brain diminishes as a result. Extending these results to the study of pain causes by the stimulus of the nervous system, he made discoveries about the reception of such signals in the brain and spatial distribution of the sensory areas of the cerebral cortex in different animals. These conclusions lead to the idea of a sensory map, called the homunculus, in the somatosensory system. This distorted view of the human body was based on the neurological "map" of the regions and parts of the human brain response.

In 1944, Prof. Josef Erlanger and Herbert Gasser were awarded the Nobel Prize in Physiology or Medicine "for their discoveries relating to the highly differentiated functions of single nerve fibres." They discovered action potentials of two phases: spike and postspike; and they revealed nerves in many forms, each with its own excitability potential. They also found a proportion between nerve fiber diameter and action potential velocity.

In 1950, Prof. Wilder Penfield published a book called The Cerebral Cortex of Man with maps of the location of various functions (motor, sensory, memory, vision) in the brain, that he defined during the process of treating epilepsy. Prof. Wilder Penfield and his colleagues Edwin Baldry and Theodore Rasmussen are considered the creators of the cortical homunculus.

== Research trends ==
Recent research focuses specific functions in the brain by exploring the interactions between different brain areas, using multiple technologies and approaches. The shadow imaging method uses standard light microscopy and melds it with fluorescence labeling of the interstitial fluid in the brain's extracellular space. This technique can help researchers understand more on anatomy and viability for their experiments, by observing neurons, microglia, tumor cells and blood capillaries more closely. The use of optogenetics allows to explore circuit function and its physiological consequences. This new technology combines genetic targeting of specific neurons with imaging to visualize targets in living neurons. By observing neurons in intact animals and tracing their electrical activity, we can monitor brain activity and understand its role in physiology. Following the spiking of thousands of individual neurons over milliseconds to months is an ambitious goal in neurophysiological research. Recent advances, including the Neuropixels 2.0 probe, have leveraged CMOS (complementary metal–oxide–semiconductor) fabrication methods to significantly increase the number and density of recording sites across extended timescales.

Beneficial neuroplasticity after neurophysiological training is another cutting-edge topic. In 2017, research provided evidence of cortical reorganization through neuroplasticity after neurophysiological training: grey matter thickness increased after a 3-month training course. However, evidence has also shown that this process is not irreversible. The brain volume increases during cognitive tasks such as writing, drawing, or sound differentiation, but within a few weeks after these activities end, it returns nearly to its previous level. Research on right-handed people has shown that after a month of learning to write and draw with their left hands, their brain volume had increased, but three weeks later, it was nearly back to normal. Research on animals that learned to use a rake to retrieve food or learned to differentiate between sounds has shown the same results.

The interaction between the nervous system and heart is a developing field of research. The hypothesis of natural neurostimulation, a physical interaction between the mother's heart and the mother's and fetus's nervous systems, has elucidated natural forces that foster beneficial neuroplasticity in the fetal nervous system, thereby developing physiological sentience and shaping cognitive functions. This hypothesis, deeply rooted in neurophysiology and physics, was introduced in 2024 and can help researchers understand the development of the nervous system, the origins of beneficial neuroplasticity, and the pathobiology in different conditions.

Research into the nervous system's influence on pathology of various diseases and the regulation of their pathobiology is a growing field of neurophysiology knowledge. In 2025, it was discovered that small-cell lung cancer cells form functional synapses with neurons, promoting tumor growth in the brain. These findings highlight the role of the nervous system in cancer progression.

== See also ==
- Brain
- Nervous system
- Journal of Neurophysiology
- Neurology
- Neuroanatomy
- Neuropsychology
- Neuropharmacology
- Neuroethology
- Neuroendocrinology
- Computational neuroscience
- Neural coding

== Sources ==
- Fye WB (October 1995). "Julien Jean César Legallois". Clinical Cardiology. 18 (10): 599–600. doi:10.1002/clc.4960181015. PMID 8785909.
- "Edwin Smith Surgical Papyrus". Cyber Museum of Neurosurgery. Archived from the original on 5 February 2020.
- Gallistel, C. R. (1981). "Bell, Magendie and the Proposals to Restrict the Use of Animals in Neurobehavioral Research" (PDF). The American Psychologist. 36 (4). Ruccs.rutgers.edu.: 357–60. doi:10.1037/0003-066x.36.4.357. PMID 7023302. Archived from the original (PDF) on 1 April 2011.
- "History of Biology 1800-1849". 26 October 2011.
- "History of Neuroscience". University of Washington.
- Duque-Parra JE (September 2004). "Perspective on the vestibular cortex throughout history". The Anatomical Record Part B: The New Anatomist. 280 (1): 15–9. doi:10.1002/ar.b.20031. PMID 15382110.
- "Article Number: EONS : 0736 : Cerebellum" (PDF). Archived from the original (PDF) on 4 March 2016.
- "David Hartley". Stanford Encyclopedia of Philosophy.
- Frank, Leonard R. (2006). "The Electroshock Quotationary" (PDF).
- Pearce JM (April 1997). "Johann Jakob Wepfer (1620-95) and cerebral haemorrhage". Journal of Neurology, Neurosurgery, and Psychiatry. 62 (4): 387. doi:10.1136/jnnp.62.4.387. PMC 1074098. PMID 9120455.
- Finger, Stanley (2001). Origins of Neuroscience. Oxford University Press. ISBN 9780195146943.
- Waln, Robert. "An Account of the Asylum for the Insane, Established by the Society of Friends, near Frankford, in the Vicinity of Philadelphia".
- "Anatomy Words".
- "Andreas Vesalius and Modern Human Anatomy". Archived from the original on 15 September 2012.
- O'Malley, Charles Donald (1964). Andreas Vesalius of Brussels, 1514-1564. University of California Press.
- Pestronk A (March 1988). "The first neurology book. De Cerebri Morbis...(1549) by Jason Pratensis". Archives of Neurology. 45 (3): 341–4. doi:10.1001/archneur.1988.00520270123032. PMID 3277602.
- "Descartes and the Pineal Gland". Stanford Encyclopedia of Philosophy.
- McCaffrey, Patrick. "Chapter 5. The Corpus Striatum, Rhinencephalon, Connecting Fibers, and Diencephalon". CMSD 620 Neuroanatomy of Speech, Swallowing and Language. The Neuroscience on the Web Series. CSU. Archived from the original on 7 January 2018.
- Brink A (December 1979). "Depression and loss: a theme in Robert Burton's 'Anatomy of melancholy' (1621)". Canadian Journal of Psychiatry. 24 (8): 767–72. doi:10.1177/070674377902400811. PMID 391384. S2CID 35532320.
- "Al-Zahrawi - Father of Surgery". Archived from the original on 5 February 2020.
- "Andreas Vesalius". Encyclopedia.com.
- Jeffery G (October 2001). "Architecture of the optic chiasm and the mechanisms that sculpt its development". Physiological Reviews. 81 (4): 1393–414. doi:10.1152/physrev.2001.81.4.1393. PMID 11581492. S2CID 203231.
- "Mondino De' Luzzi". Encyclopedia.com.
- "A History of the Brain". Stanford University.
