= Aaron White =

Aaron White may refer to:

- Aaron White (playwright) (born 1980), American playwright
- Aaron White (basketball) (born 1992), American basketball player
