= Pratensis =

Pratensis may refer to:

== As a surname ==
- Felix Pratensis (? - 1539), a Sephardic (specifically Italian) Jewish scholar who embraced Roman Catholicism
- Jason Pratensis (1486 – 1558), a Southern Netherlandish humanist physician and poet.

== Other uses ==
- Pratensis, a Latin word commonly used in systematic names
