= Consulate of the United States, Fukuoka =

Coordinates: 33°35′17.1″N 130°22′22.9″E

U.S. Consulate Fukuoka
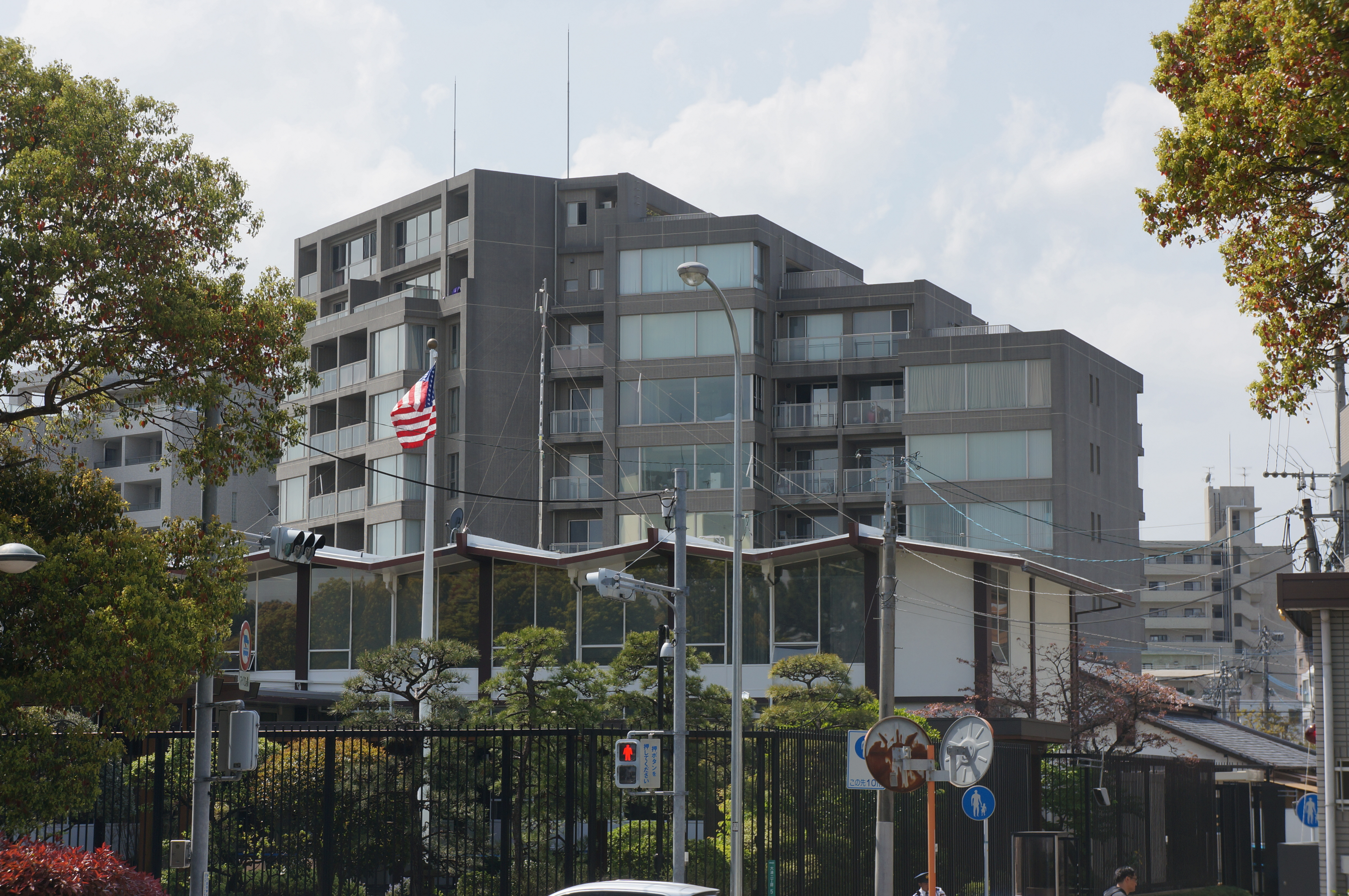
- Location: Japan
- Address: 2-5-26 Ohori, Chuo-ku, Fukuoka City, Fukuoka Prefecture
- Consul General: Chuka Asike
- Website: jp.usembassy.gov

The Consulate of the United States, Fukuoka (Japanese: 在福岡米国領事館) is a consular post of the United States in Fukuoka City, Fukuoka Prefecture, Japan.

The consulate has a public relations division called the Fukuoka American Center.

Currently it is the only U.S. consulate in Kyushu, but for about 80 years from the late Tokugawa period to the start of the Pacific War, the consulate was located in Nagasaki instead of Fukuoka.

== History ==
In August 1950 a U.S. consular post was opened in Daimyo-cho, Fukuoka City. This post was moved to a famous white building known as the "White House" in Tenjin, Fukuoka City, in March 1952. On April 28, 1952, following the enforcement of the Treaty of San Francisco, it was established as the U.S. Consulate in Fukuoka. The first Principal Officer was Owen J. Zurhellen. It moved to Ōhori in October 1960, and remains there to this day.

== Principal Officer ==
Term	Name	Start date	End date	Notes
1	Owen J. Zurhellen Jr.	March 1950	September 1953	
2	James V. Martin Jr.	1953	1955	
3	Richard Middleton Herndon	1956	1960	
4	Richard Wilson Petree	June 1960	August 1963	
5	Thomas P. Shoesmith	September 1963	August 1966	
6	Toshio George Tsukahira	August 1966	November 1968	
7	Gerard M. Sutton	March 1969	July 1970	
8	James H. Ashida	September 1970	September 1972	
9	Karl Spence Richardson	September 1972	June 1976	
10	David A. Pabst	September 1976	July 1979	
11	Craig G. Dunkerley	August 1979	July 1981	
12	Marilyn A. Myers	August 1981	July 1983	
13	Richard A. Morford	August 1983	July 1986	
14	Stephen W. Kennedy	August 1986	August 1989	
15	Evans J. R. Revere	August 1989	August 1992	
16	Donald Yamamoto	July 1992	June 1995	
17	Jason Hyland	June 1995	June 1998	
18	Kevin K. Maher	June 1998	July 2001	
19	Woo Chan Lee	July 2001	July 2004	
20	Joyce S. Wong	July 2004	July 2007	
21	Margot J. Carrington	August 2007	July 2010	
22	Jason R. Cubas	August 2010	May 2013	
23	Yuriy R. Fedkiw	September 2013	July 2016	
24	Joy Michiko Sakurai	August 2016	July 2019	
25	John C. Taylor	August 2019	June 2022	
26	Chuka Asike	July 2022	June 2025	

|- ! 27 | Virsa Perkins | July 2025 | Present | |}

== See also ==
- Japan–United States relations
- Embassy of the United States, Tokyo
