= Jason Rosenfield =

American film producer (born 1945)

- Born: May 25, 1945 (age 81); New York City, New York, U.S.
- Education: University of Pennsylvania / Vermont College of Fine Arts
- Occupations: Film editor, writer, director, producer, and educator
- Years active: 1979–present
- Awards: Emmy Award; Memphis PD: War on the Streets, 1997; Teen Killers: A Second Chance, 1999
- Website: www.jasonrosenfield.com

Jason Rosenfield (born 1945, New York City) is an American film editor, writer, director, producer and educator known mostly for his work in story-driven feature-length documentaries. Elected to membership in American Cinema Editors., an honorary society of distinguished editors, he has earned multiple Emmy Awards for his work and contributed to numerous additional awards, including an Emmy Award and three nominations, an Academy Award nomination, a Peabody and R.F. Kennedy Award.

== Early life ==
Raised in New Rochelle, N.Y. and introduced to painting, jazz and musical theater as a child, Rosenfield was inspired to pursue a career in the arts. He attended the University of Pennsylvania until his father's death forced him to leave to help support his family. Eventually moving into New York's Greenwich Village and its dynamic mix of dancers, performance artists and filmmakers, he focused on dance before injuries and a fortuitous part-time job introduced him to film editing, which he saw as a natural extension of dance and choreography. While experimenting with cinematic form on his own, Rosenfield took freelance jobs assisting senior editors in television commercials and nonfiction programming, finally joining the Motion Picture Editors Guild in 1979 and pursuing a full-time career.

== Career ==
Rosenfield earned his first major feature credit with Robert Altman's Come Back to the 5 & Dime Jimmy Dean, Jimmy Dean and first documentary credit with Perry Miller Adato's DGA Award-winning Eugene O’Neill: A Glory of Ghosts before moving to Los Angeles in 1989. Arnold Shapiro's The American Dream Contest and Arthur Barron's Rita Hayworth: Dancing Into the Dream was followed in 1992 by his debut as a director, writer, and producer of a theatrical short for the World Wildlife Fund, The Kingdom, which earned him a Cine Golden Eagle Award and Cindy Writing Award. He followed this as editor, writer and co-producer of Discovery Channel's To Be With Sharks, then wrote, directed and produced On Nature's Trail, an award-winning series of three short fictional children's films for National Geographic.

Between 1994 and 1997, Rosenfield edited a number of films for Half-Court Pictures’ Bill Guttentag and Vince DiPersio, including the Oscar-nominated Blues Highway and Emmy Award-winning HBO films Memphis PD and Teen Killers, before joining R. J. Cutler's Emmy Award-winning series American High for Fox and PBS. Rosenfield continued his work in television series with Bunim-Murray's 10th season of The Real World, followed by Bill Guttentag and Dick Wolf's Law & Order: Crime & Punishment, which ran for two seasons on NBC. Two years later he served as lead editor for Rob Roy Thomas’ improvisational TV comedy Free Ride.

In 2001, Rosenfield was elected to membership in American Cinema Editors (ACE), an honorary society of distinguished editors, one of a handful of documentary editors to be so honored. He has since held an active role in ACE, serving as Associate Director of the ACE Board from 2012 to 2015 and on the Membership and Eddy Awards Blue Ribbon Committees.

As Rosenfield's acclamation in the industry rose, his influence expanded beyond the editing room. Beginning in 2006, Rosenfield served three terms on the Academy of Television Arts and Sciences Board of Governors, helping spearhead the annual Prime Cuts Emmy-adjacent symposiums and developing numerous special events, including "Transparent: Anatomy of an Episode," with Jill Soloway and hosted by J. J. Abrams. He spent almost two decades on the Academy's Picture Editors and Documentary Peer Groups Executive Committees.

Rosenfield's credits expanded further over the next decade with many award-winning documentaries. In 2004, he co-edited Black Sky: Burt Rutan's Race for Space, which won a Peabody Award. In 2007 and 2010, respectively, he edited Vince DiPersio's Semper Fi and the Emmy-nominated The Kennedy Detail. Between 2012 and 2014 Rosenfield collaborated with Joshua Rofé and three-time Oscar winner Mark Jonathan Harris on Rofe's feature-length documentaries Lost for Life and Swift Current, followed in 2016 by Harris’ Breaking Point: The War for Democracy in Ukraine. In 2018 he joined Rofe and Oscar winner Jordan Peele's four-part Amazon series Lorena as supervising editor. Lorena received an IDA Award nomination and premiered at the 2019 Sundance Film Festival. Other honored documentaries credits include Living Undocumented and The Seventies.

Rosenfield's experience in the editing room proved to be a catalyst for the mentorship and influence he would provide as a story and editorial consultant. Brett Fallentine's award-winning story of Compton's African-American cowboys, Fire on the Hill, initiated Rosenfield's consulting career in 2017 (he eventually received a full editing credit). That same year, Rosenfield consulted and served as supervising editor on Apo Bazidi's award-winning Resistance is Life, the story of an eight-year old Kurdish refugee fleeing ISIS. In 2018, his consulting credits included Do No Harm, Emmy winner Robyn Symon's investigative look into physician burnout, and Amelia Rose Blaire's award-winning narrative short Desert Prayer (for which he also received an editing credit). In 2019 he consulted on Ian Cheney's Picture a Scientist, which was selected for the 2020 Tribeca Film Festival, Apo Bazidi's How Far is Home, a story of Syrian refugees in America's heartland that premiered at the 2020 Cleveland International Film Festival, and Academy Award winner Mitchell Block's Sara, still in post-production.

In 2016, Rosenfield joined the faculty at USC's prestigious School of Cinematic Arts, mentoring graduate and undergraduate students through both fiction and documentary productions. He is a recurrent guest lecturer at various film schools, including ShanghaiTech University and Chapman University. In 2015, the Stowe (Vt.) Story Labs Screenwriting Workshop recruited Rosenfield as the first picture editor to serve as mentor to burgeoning screenwriters. In 2017, Rosenfield was selected by the U.S. State Department's American Film Showcase to lead international workshops on editing and storytelling.

In 2018, Rosenfield received his MFA in Film from the Vermont College of Fine Arts, delivering as his thesis project a manuscript for his memoir "Chasing the Monster: Confessions of a Film Editor," chronicling his career and life at the crossroads between art and artist. Rosenfield continues his career as an educator, film editor, consultant and writer. He is developing a documentary film based on his memoir with movie director Robert Townsend, and an online college curriculum for film students in collaboration with Peter Hawley, former Dean of Columbia College Hollywood and current Director of the Illinois Film Office

== Filmography ==
=== Editor: Feature Documentaries ===
Year	Title	Director	Notes
2019	Sara	Mitchell Block	Consulting Editor; In Post-Production
2019	Picture a Scientist	Ian Cheney	Consulting Editor; In Post-Production
2018	Kupenda	Philip Knowlton	
2018	Do No Harm	Robyn Symon	Consulting Editor
2017-2018	Fire on The Hill	Brett Fallentine	
2017	Resistance is Life	Apo Bazidi	Supervising Editor
2016	Breaking Point: The War for Democracy in Ukraine	Mark Jonathan Harris	Theatrical release 2018
2014	Swift Current	Joshua Rofé	
2013	Spirit of the Marathon 2	Jon Dunham	
2012	Lost for Life	Joshua Rofé	
2010	The Kennedy Detail	Vince DiPersio	Nominated for an Emmy Award
2009	Worse Than War	Michael DeWitt	
2009	HouseQuake	Karen Elizabeth Price	
2007	Semper Fi	Vince DiPersio	
2006	Secrets of the Code	Jonathan Stack	
2004	Black Sky: The Race for Space	Sandy Guthrie, Scott B	Received a Peabody Award
2003	Top Speed	Greg MacGillivray	Imax Feature
1998	Teen Killers: A Second Chance	Bill Guttentag & Vince DiPersio	
1998	Kids Who Kill	Jason Rosenfield	Director/Editor
1996	Memphis PD: War on the Streets	Bill Guttentag & Vince DiPersio	Received a R.F. Kennedy Award; Nominated for a CableACE Award
1994	Blues Highway	Bill Guttentag & Vince DiPersio	Nominated for an Academy Award (Oscar); Received a W.C. Handy Award; Nominated for the Chicago Intl. Film Festival Grand Prize: Gold Hugo Award
1989	A White Garment of Churches	Perry Miller Adato	
1986	Eugene O'Neill: A Glory of Ghosts	Perry Miller Adato	Received a DGA Award

=== Editor: Television Series ===
==== Documentary ====
Year	Title	Producer	Notes
2019	Living Undocumented	Aaron Saidman	
2018	Lorena	Steven Berger, Jordan Peele, Amazon	Supervising Editor; Director: Joshua Rofé; 4-part limited series
2015	The Seventies: War of the Sexes	Mark Herzog, CNN	Nominated for an Emmy Award; Nominated for an IDA Award
2001-2004	Law & Order: Crime & Punishment	Bill Guttentag, Dick Wolf, NBC	
1999-2000	American High	RJ Cutler, Fox/PBS	Received an Emmy Award
2001	The Real World	Jonathan Murray & Mary-Ellis Bunim, MTV	
2001	Making the Band	Jonathan Murray & Mary-Ellis Bunim, MTV	
2001	Road Rules	Jonathan Murray & Mary-Ellis Bunim, MTV	
2001	Challenge	Jonathan Murray & Mary-Ellis Bunim, MTV	

==== Reality ====
Year	Title	Producer
2012	Face Off	Dwight Smith et al., Syfy
2012	Million Dollar Closets	Rich Bye, HGTV
2010	Drama! Pilot	Vince DiPersio, BET

==== Comedy ====
Year	Title	Director/Producer	Notes
2009	The Breakup Guy	Aaron Hilliard/CBS	Pilot
2008	Trendsetters	Aaron Hilliard/ABC	Pilot
2006	Free Ride	Rob Roy Thomas, Fox TV	Lead Editor

=== Editor: Narrative Films ===
Year	Title	Director
2018	Desert Prayer	Courtney Thérond
2016	Echo Park Blues (Consulting Editor)	Michael Bofshever
2008	Learning to Fly	Gay Thomas
1982	Come Back to the 5 & Dime Jimmy Dean, Jimmy Dean	Robert Altman

=== Director ===
Year	Title	Producer	Notes
2000-2001	American High (Shared Credit)	RJ Cutler, Fox/PBS	TV documentary Series
1998	Kids Who Kill	John Lindsay, Oregon Public Broadcasting	TV documentary
1995	On Nature's Trail (Producer/Writer/Director)	Jason, Rosenfield, National Geographic Society	Three-part fictional children's series
1992	The Kingdom (co-producer)	Michael Rosenberg, Brion Black, World Wildlife Fund	

=== Writer ===
Year	Title	Producer	Notes
1995	On Nature's Trail (Producer/Writer/Director)	Jason Rosenfield, National Geographic Society	Three-part fictional children's series
1994	To Be With Sharks: View From the Cage	Marty Snyderman, Discovery Channel	
1992	The Kingdom (co-producer)	Michael Rosenberg, Brion Black, World Wildlife Fund	

=== Producer ===
Year	Title	Notes
2012	Million Dollar Closets	Reality TV Series, HGTV
2011	Project Accessory	Reality Competition TV Series, Lifetime
2011	Ned Bruha: Skunk Whisperer	Reality TV Series, Animal Planet
2009	Elk Avenue	TV Pilot Presentation
1998	Teen Killers: A Second Chance?	TV documentary, HBO
1995	On Nature's Trail (Producer/Writer/Director)	Three-part fictional children's series, National Geographic Society
1994	To Be with Sharks: View From the Cage (co-producer)	Producer: Marty Snyderman, Discovery Channel
1992	The Kingdom (co-producer)	Theatrical short, Producer: Michael Rosenberg, Brion Black, World Wildlife Fund

== Awards ==
=== Individual ===
Year	Award	Title	Result
2019	Southampton Film Festival: Best Film Editing	Desert Prayer	Nominated
1999	Emmy Award	Teen Killers: A Second Chance?	Won
1999	Emmy Award	Kids Who Kill	Won
1997	Emmy Award	Memphis PD: War in the Streets	Won
1995	World Medal New York Festivals	On Nature's Trail	Won
1995	Columbus Intl. Film Festival: Bronze Medal	On Nature's Trail	Won
1992	CINE Golden Eagle	The Kingdom	Won
1991	Cindy Writing Award	The Kingdom	Won
1984	CINE Golden Eagle	The Cafeteria	Won

=== Production ===
Year	Award	Title	Result
2016	Emmy Award	The Seventies	Nominated
2015	IDA Award	The Seventies	Nominated
2011	Emmy Award	The Kennedy Detail	Nominated
2004	Peabody Award	Black Sky: Burt Rutan's Race for Space	Won
2000	Emmy Award	(PBS season) American High	Nominated
2000	Emmy Award	(Fox season) American High	Won
1997	R.F. Kennedy Award	Memphis PD: War in the Streets	Won
1997	CableACE Award	Memphis PD: War in the Streets	Nominated
1995	Academy Award (Oscar)	Blues Highway	Nominated
1995	W.C. Handy Award	Blues Highway	Won
1994	Chicago Intl. Film Festival Grand Prize: Gold Hugo	Blues Highway	Nominated
1986	DGA Award	Eugene O’Neill: A Glory of Ghosts	Won
1982	Chicago Intl. Film Festival: Grand Prize: Gold Hugo	Come Back to the Five and Dime, Jimmy Dean, Jimmy Dean	Won
