= Jacin =

- Pronunciation: /ˈdʒeɪsɪn/ JAY-sin
- Gender: Unisex

Origin
- Origin: Spanish
- Meaning: "Hyacinth" (female) "Healer" (male)

Other names
- Related names: Jacinta, Hyacinth, Jason

Jacin is a unisex given name. It is either Spanish in origin, and is a shortened form of Jacinta, meaning "Hyacinth", or a variation on the spelling of Jason, both ultimately from Greek.

== People ==
Notable people with the name include:

- Jacin Sinclair (1972–2010), Australian professional rugby league footballer
