= Jason White =

Jason White may refer to:

== Entertainment ==
- Jason White (musician, born 1967), American singer-songwriter and multi-instrumentalist
- Jason White (Green Day guitarist), guitarist for Green Day and Pinhead Gunpowder
- Jason White, a fictional character from the 2006 film Superman Returns

== Sports ==
- Jason White (American football) (born 1980), former quarterback for the University of Oklahoma football team
- Jason White (American racing driver) (born 1979), American racing driver
- Jason White (Canadian racing driver) (born 1973), Canadian stock car racing driver
- Jason White (footballer, born 1971), English football player
- Jason White (footballer, born 1984), English football goalkeeper
- Jason White (rugby union) (born 1978), Scottish rugby union player

== Other ==
- Jason White (politician) (born 1972), American politician in the Mississippi House of Representatives
- Jason Christophe White, American playwright
