= Jayceon =

- Pronunciation: English: /ˈdʒeɪsən/ JAY-sən; French: [ʒazɔ̃]
- Gender: Male
- Language: English

Origin
- Language: English
- Origin: Respelling of Jason
- Meaning: Healer

Other names
- Nickname: Jay

Jayceon is a masculine given name. It is a modern alternative spelling of the name Jason. It is pronounced identically to Jason.

== Usage and popularity ==
The name first appeared on the SSA's list of the 1,000 most popular boys' names in 2013, at number 207. The name was given to 1,849 baby boys that year.

== People ==
- Jayceon Taylor (born 1979), American rapper, better known as The Game
