= The Dance: The History of American Minstrelsy =

- Written by: Jason Christophe White

Premiere
- Date: 2005

The Dance: The History of American Minstrelsy is an American stage play written by Jason Christophe White and co-directed by Aaron White, which opened in 2005 in the KAOS Cinefreestyle Theatre in Los Angeles. The play follows two characters as they relay the history of American Minstrelsy, as both main characters perform in blackface.

== Synopsis ==
The Dance is an educational play based upon the history of American Minstrelsy. This history is conveyed to the audience, but from the perspectives of two stock minstrel clowns, who perform this history as a historic minstrel production. Using authentic past and present day images, and with a text developed from 6 years of research, the audience ends up making comparisons between past-day minstrelsy, and the lingering perceptions that still exist today.

== Cast ==
- Aaron White
- Jason Christophe White

== Awards and critical response ==
Since the premiere of the play in 2005, The Dance has gathered outstanding reviews.

In 2007, The Dance: The History of American Minstrelsy won an NAACP award for “Best Playwright”. The production has garnered the support of Harry Belafonte, KCET and others.
