= Elizabeth Ann "Betty" Hyland =

American author who wrote on the topic of schizophrenia

Betty Hyland
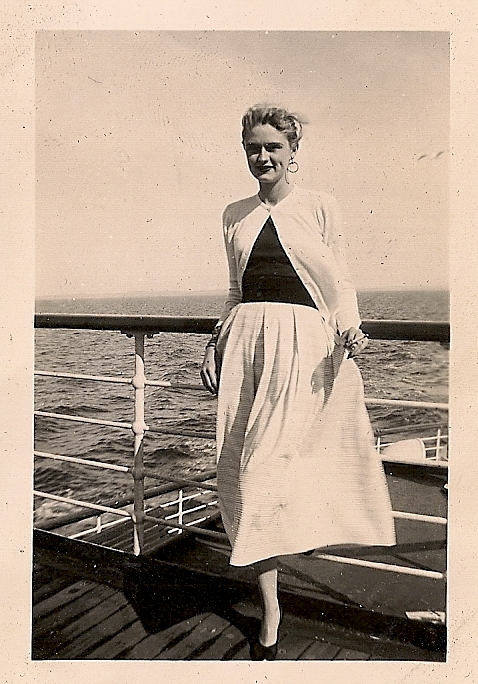
- Born: 1927; Queens, New York
- Died: 2012, 84 years old Reston, Virginia
- Resting place: Oakton, Virginia
- Other names: Betty Hyland
- Citizenship: United States
- Education: Katharine Gibbs School
- Occupation: Author
- Notable work: The Girl With The Crazy Brother, A Thousand Cloudy Days
- Spouse: Carl Austin Hyland
- Children: Carl, Mark (deceased), Jason
- Awards: 1993 Bryant Swann Memorial Prize, Eugene V. Debs Foundation

Elizabeth Ann "Betty" Hyland (1927–2012) was an American author who wrote on the topic of schizophrenia and was a president of the Writers of Chantilly literary organization in Northern Virginia. She was the author of numerous novels, novellas and non-fiction articles and was active in both Southern California and Northern Virginia, especially with the National Alliance on Mental Illness.

Betty Hyland's son Mark was diagnosed with schizophrenia in his 20s. Her candid and very personal writing about the impact of schizophrenia on families encouraged more open discussion of mental illness at a time when such openness was uncommon. Hyland was very influenced by the pathbreaking research of psychiatrist and author Dr. E. Fuller Torrey, which inspired her to dedicate the rest of her life to helping society understand this illness better. Hyland's best-known novel The Girl With the Crazy Brother published by Franklin Watts in 1987, about a teenager having trouble with her schizophrenic brother. The book became the basis for a 1990 CBS Schoolbreak Special teleplay directed by Diane Keaton and starring Patricia Arquette. In the 61st Primetime Emmy Awards, Host Neil Patrick Harris referenced The Girl with the Crazy Brother in introducing Arquette.

Hyland won a grant to study the treatment of mental illness in China in 1989, and was doing her research there at the time of the Tiananmen Square events. She was also the winner of the 1993 Bryant Spann Memorial Prize from the Eugene V. Debs Foundation for her essay on schizophrenia, "First Person Account: A Thousand Cloudy Days," originally published in 1991 in the Schizophrenia Bulletin.

Elizabeth Ann Sheehan was born in Queens. She attended the Katharine Gibbs School in New York. She worked as a secretary in New York. Later she worked in the English Department at the California Institute of Technology, and subsequently to northern Virginia in the early 1990s. She began writing in the late 1970s after moving to Altadena, California, where she became a regular contributor to local publications.

Betty Hyland was a member of the Society of Children's Book Writers, Sisters in Crime, P.E.N.USA, and the National Alliance on Mental Illness. In addition to her books and articles on schizophrenia, she also wrote mysteries featuring Benedictine nuns, and many other works. In Hope in Hell, Hyland explored the psychology of a woman, the victim of abuse, who becomes a serial killer. Tressa, a novella about an Irish circus in Depression-era New York, drew extensively on the summers she spent in the 1930s and 1940s in Fort Edward, in Upstate New York.

Diplomat and scholar Jason Hyland was her son.

== Selected bibliography of novels and poetry ==
1. The Girl With the Crazy Brother
2. A Thousand Cloudy Days: Three Months in the Life of a Schizophrenic Man
3. Ping's Point of View: Poems to a Siamese Cat
4. Tressa and the Lost Circus of Ireland
5. Hope in Hell
6. The Benedictine Bloodhounds
