= Jaison =

Jaison is a masculine given name and an alternative spelling of "Jason". Notable people with the name include:

- Jaison Ibarrola (born 1986), Paraguayan footballer
- Jaison McGrath (born 1996}, Scottish footballer
- Jaison Peters (born 1989), West Indian cricketer
- Jaison Robinson (born 1980), contestant from Survivor: Samoa
- Jaison Vales (born 1988), Indian footballer

== See also ==
- Jason (given name), people with the given name "Jason"
