= Jason Hughes =

Jason Hughes may refer to:

- Jason Hughes (actor) (born 1970), Welsh actor
- Jason Hughes (auto racing) (born 1969), owner-driver of the Kartworld Racing auto racing team
- Jason Hughes (politician), member of the Louisiana House of Representatives
- Jason Hughes (sociologist), Professor of Sociology at the University of Leicester, UK
- Jason Hughes (educator), American teacher from Georgia

== See also ==
- Jason Jones-Hughes (born 1976), rugby player
- Hughes (surname)
