= Jason Da Costa =

Jason Da Costa is an English autodidact in the art and science of the aeroplane and flight simulation technology. His work in adapting computer based flight simulation technology with complete replication of airliner cockpits has attained industry recognition.

Da Costa's aviation endeavours include aerospace technology coursework, flight phobia solutions, lower cost flight simulation design and function.
