= Jayson Lilley =

British artist

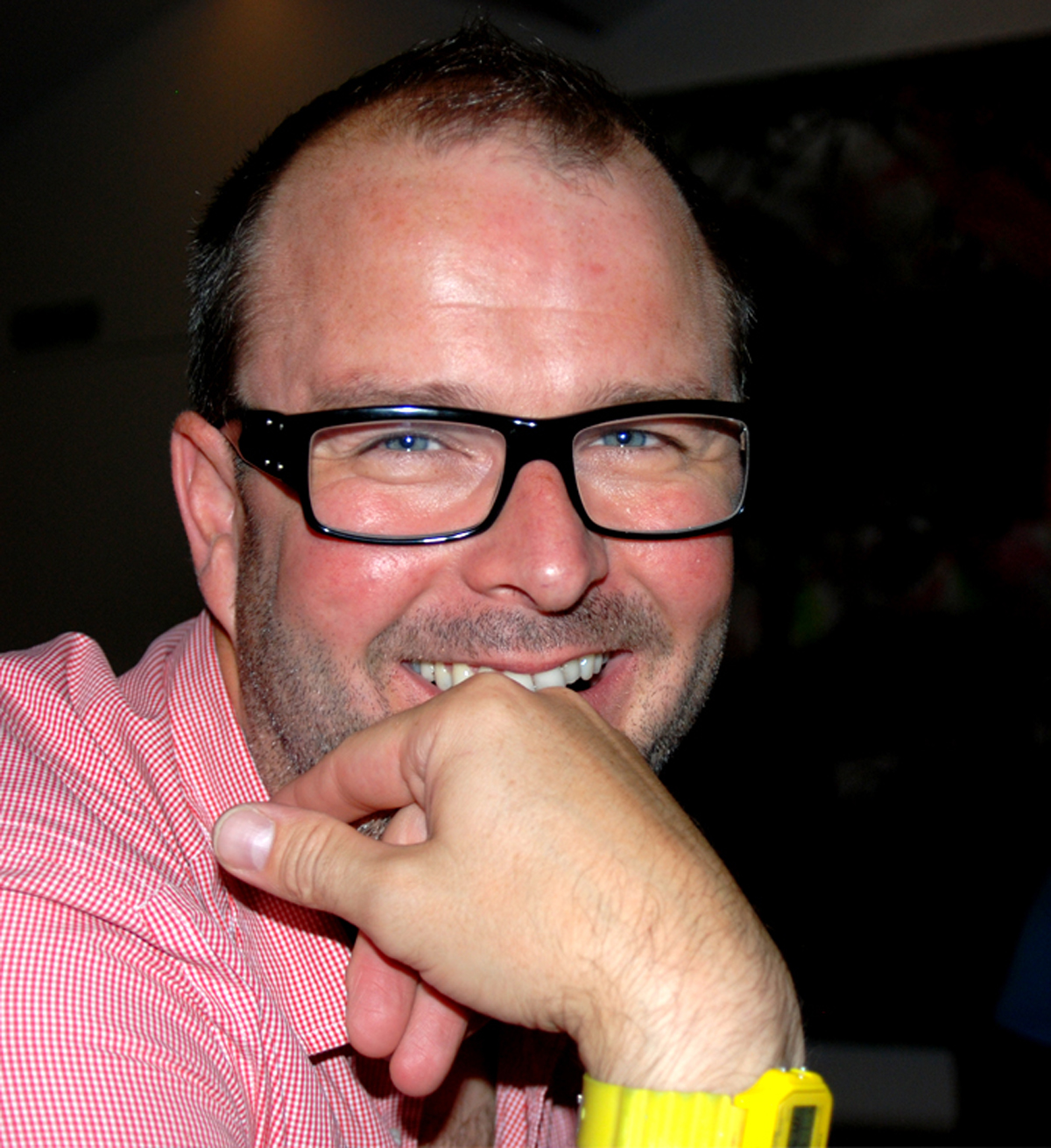
- Born: Plymouth, Devon
- Education: University for the Creative Arts
- Occupation: Contemporary artist
- Known for: Representation of Battersea Power Station
- Website: www.jaysonlilley.com

Jayson Lilley is a contemporary British artist recognised for producing paintings of urban scenes and iconic architecture of the United Kingdom. Lilley was born in Plymouth, Devon and grew up in the small coastal village of Wembury.

His work predominantly portrays scenes based around London, where he had lived and worked since graduated from the University for the Creative Arts in 1999. Lilley creates original paintings using acrylics and spray paint, and is best known for his representation of Battersea Power Station.
