= Jayson Gaignard =

Canadian entrepreneur

- Occupations: Author, entrepreneur
- Known for: Founder of MastermindTalks
- Children: 1 daughter
- Website: MastermindTalks.com

Jayson Gaignard is a Canadian entrepreneur, networking specialist, and author who founded MastermindTalks, an invitation-only conference for entrepreneurs, in 2013.

== Background ==
Gaignard dropped out of high school at the age of 17 and started working as an auto mechanic. In 2004, Gaignard founded VIP Services Inc., a Toronto-based full-service concierge company. This company later evolved into an online ticket seller and changed its name to Tickets Canada, generating $5 million in annual sales.

== MastermindTalks ==
In 2012, Gaignard began initiating curated dinners in Toronto, Canada with involving small groups of entrepreneurs with a focus on relationship building. The invite-only dinners became MastermindTalks—larger conferences for entrepreneurs geared toward health, wealth, self-improvement, and networking. Past MastermindTalks speakers include Tim Ferriss, James Altucher, A. J. Jacobs, Esther Perel, Dave Asprey, Guy Kawasaki, and Marc Ecko. Forbes described Gaignard as one of the top networkers to watch in 2015.
