= Jason Ralph (footballer) =

Australian rules footballer

Personal information
- Full name: Jason Courtney Ralph
- Born: 28 June 1872; Richmond, Victoria
- Died: 6 February 1952 (aged 79); South Melbourne, Victoria

Playing career^{1}
Years	Club	Games (Goals)
1898	South Melbourne	5 (0)
- ^{1} Playing statistics correct to the end of 1898.

Jason Courtney Ralph (28 June 1872 – 6 February 1952) was an Australian rules footballer who played with South Melbourne in the Victorian Football League (VFL).
