= Jason Lee (disambiguation) =

Jason Lee (born 1970) is an American film and TV actor and former professional skateboarder.

Jason Lee may also refer to:

== Entertainment ==
- Jason Scott Lee (born 1966), Asian American film actor
- Jaxon Lee (Jason Christopher Lee, born 1968), American voice-actor and co-founder of Gaijin Productions
- Jason Lee (host) (born 1977), American media mogul and podcaster
- Jason Y. Lee, founder of Jubilee Media

== Sports ==
- Jason Lee (field hockey) (born 1970), English field hockey player and coach
- Jason Lee (footballer) (born 1971), English footballer and football manager
- Jason Lee (rugby league) (born 1971), of the 1990s and 2000s for Wales, Warrington Wolves, Keighley, and Halifax
- Jason Lee (wrestler) (born 1990), Hong Kong professional wrestler

== Other people ==
- Jason Lee (missionary) (1803–1845), American missionary and pioneer in the Oregon Territory
  - Statue of Jason Lee, Salem, Oregon, U.S.
- Jason Lee (judge) (1915–1980), American judge and politician in Oregon

== Other uses ==
- Jason Lee Middle School (disambiguation)
- Jason Lee Elementary School, Richland School District (Washington)
- Jason Lee House, part of Willamette Heritage Center, Salem, Oregon, U.S.

== See also ==
- Jason Lees (born 1977), Australian wheelchair rugby player
- Jason Lee Scott, Red Ranger from Mighty Morphin' Power Rangers
