= Aaron White (playwright) =

American dramatist

- Born: 1980 (age 45–46); Inglewood, CA
- Education: California Institute of the Arts
- Occupations: Playwright, Producer, Director

Aaron White (born 1980) is an American actor and director, his most notable work for The Dance: The History of American Minstrelsy, which he co-wrote and co-directed with Jason Christophe White (no relation). He is also an independent music producer, and the owner and founder of Slingshot Media.

He graduated from St. Bernard High School, in Playa Del Rey, CA, in 1998, and is a graduate of The California Institute of the Arts, where he received a Bachelor of Fine Arts in Theater in 2003.

== Plays ==
- City Noise (play) (2003)
- The Blood They Shed (2004)
- The Dance: The History of American Minstrelsy (2005) (Co-Director)

== Awards ==
In 2007, The Dance: The History of American Minstrelsy won an NAACP award for “Best Playwright” with the co-playwrights being Jason Christophe White and Aaron White.
