= Jason Brown =

Jason Brown may refer to:

- Jason Brown (American football) (born 1983), American football player turned farmer
- Jason Brown (baseball) (born 1974), American baseball coach
- Jason Brown (cricketer) (born 1974), English cricketer
- Jason Brown (footballer) (born 1982), Welsh international football goalkeeper
- Jason Brown (figure skater) (born 1994), American figure skater
- Jason Brown (lawyer) (born 1971), American lawyer
- Jason Brown (writer) (born 1969), American writer
- Jason B. Brown (1839–1898), United States Representative from Indiana
- Jason Derek Brown (born 1969), American fugitive
- Jason "J" Brown (born 1976), English singer
- Jason R. Brown (born 1970), American businessman
- Jason Robert Brown (born 1970), American musical theater composer and lyricist
- Colt Ford (born 1969), American musician who formerly golfed under the name Jason Brown
- Jason Walter Brown (born 1938), American neurologist and writer
