= Jay Mo =

British musical artist

- Born: Jason Mohan; 25 May 1979 (age 47); London, England
- Occupations: Filmmaker, musician
- Years active: 2006–present
- Label: Golden Age Media Ent.
- Website: Official website

Jason Mohan (born 25 May 1979), known by his stage name Jay Mo, is an English songwriter, singer, rapper, musician and filmmaker. Currently based in Dubai, Jay Mo was born in London, and educated in England, West Africa, and Los Angeles.

== Early career and education ==
Jay Mo began his musical training from the age of ten when he studied several musical instruments. At the age of 11, Jay Mo recorded his self-titled debut album 'Jay Mo- Jam' under the Pigeon Records label at the TV3 Ghana studios in Ghana with the help of Ghanaian music producer Panji Anoff.

At the age of 16, Jay Mo released his album Faith in the Black Stars, for the Ghana World Cup football team (who were competing in the finals in Germany 2006). Recorded with his group G-Force, Jay Mo's anthem was titled "We Go Go". G-Force were hailed by the Sports Ministry of Ghana for being the first generation of black and white musicians to hit the West African music scene.

Subsequent to his education at Hurtwood House in Surrey in the United Kingdom, Jay Mo completed a degree in Music and the Recording Arts at the SAE Institute of London. After graduating, Jay relocated to Los Angeles with the New York Film Academy in Universal Studios to do his Masters of Fine Arts in Filmmaking where he began working on music videos, commercials and short films, as well as co-writing music for up and coming artists and creating film scores in the independent film sector.

== Music career ==
Jay debuted onto the UK Asian Scene in 2012 with urban pop artist Arjun from London, who has been featured in the MTV's Top 20 Unsigned Acts for 2012. Jay Mo produced the song " With Us Or Against Us" and sent it to Arjun who developed lyrics for the track. The video for the track was then filmed in Los Angeles & directed by Jay.

In April 2013, Jay Mo and Geet K. submitted an English Remix of the hit song "Tum Hi Ho" from the Bollywood film "Aashiqui 2" to T-Series ( India's largest Music Label). On 29 June 2013 T-Series announced on their Facebook page that Jay Mo and Geet K. were the winners of the competition amongst thousands of entries from around the world.

After relocating to his home in Dubai in 2015, Jay started writing and producing. He created tracks such as HAPPY along with Citi 101.6FM, a tune that became a New Year's anthem in Dubai, & See You Again, a Hinglish mash-up released to celebrate Friendship Day & he was able to carve a niche for himself.

== Awards ==
Jay Mo's film, "The Successor of Katunga" screened at Warner Brother Studios, Hollywood in January 2013.

In August 2013, Jay Mo received the award for "Best Children's Film" at the AOF Festival in L.A. for the Successor of Katunga.

In September 2013 Jay Mo was awarded an African Oscar (NAFCA 2013) – the first winner of Indian descent to win the award. The awards ceremony was held on Saturday 14 September 2013 in Washington D.C. at the Warner Theater. Jay Mo received his award for "Best Original Soundtrack" for the film The Foetus, directed by Hollywood-based Nigerian film director, John Chuka.

In 2014, Jay picked up an African for his own film The Successor of Katunga. Overall Jay's film had about 10 nominations during its two years of touring the festival circuit and picked up seven awards. Including Pan African Film Festival, Best Shorts, Hollywood CFF, Garifuna Film Fest.
