= Jason King =

Jason King may refer to:

- Jason King (American football) (born 1993), offensive lineman for the New England Patriots
- Jason King (ice hockey) (born 1981), ice hockey player
- Jason King (presenter) (born 1975), British radio DJ
- Jason King (rugby league) (born 1981), Manly Sea Eagles rugby league player
- Jason King (speedway rider) (born 1985), English speedway rider
- Jason King, former graphic designer of Geography Now

in fiction:

- Jason King (TV series), British television programme
- Jason King (character), fictional character in Jason King and Department S
