= Jason Moore =

Jason Moore may refer to:

== Sports ==
- Jason Moore (safety) (born 1976), American football defensive back
- Jason Moore (wide receiver) (born 1995), American football wide receiver
- Jason Moore (racing driver) (born 1988), British motor racing driver
- Jason Moore (soccer) (born 1978), American soccer player

== Others ==
- Jason Moore (director) (born 1970), American theater and movie director
- Jason Moore (Wikipedia editor) (born 1984 or 1985), Wikipedia editor and organizer
- Jason H. Moore, American computational geneticist and translational bioinformatician
- Jason R. Moore, Jamaican-American actor
- Jason W. Moore, American environmental historian and sociologist, co-author of A History of the World in Seven Cheap Things

== See also ==
- Jayson More (born 1969), Canadian ice hockey player
