= Jason Taylor =

Jason Taylor may refer to:

== Sports ==
- Jason Taylor (American football) (born 1974), American football player
- Jason Taylor (Australian rules footballer) (born 1968), Australian rules footballer
- Jason Taylor (English footballer) (born 1987), English footballer
- Jason Taylor (rugby league) (born 1971), Australian rugby league footballer and coach
- Jason Taylor (tennis) (born 1994), Australian tennis player
- Jason Taylor II (born 1999), American football player

== Other ==
- Jason deCaires Taylor (born 1974), British sculptor

== Fictional characters ==
- Jason Taylor (Fifty Shades), fictional character
