= Jayson Breitenbach =

German footballer

Personal information
- Date of birth: 12 May 1998 (age 28)
- Place of birth: Gelnhausen, Germany
- Height: 1.83 m (6 ft 0 in)
- Position: Right-back

Team information
- Current team: Kickers Offenbach
- Number: 27

Youth career
- –2013: Kickers Offenbach
- 2013–2017: Mainz 05

Senior career*
| Years | Team | Apps | (Gls) |
| 2017–2019 | Mainz 05 II | 49 | (1) |
| 2019–2021 | 1. FC Saarbrücken | 33 | (1) |
| 2021– | Kickers Offenbach | 139 | (5) |
- * Club domestic league appearances and goals as of 24 September 2026

Jayson Breitenbach (born 12 May 1998) is a German professional footballer who plays as a right-back for Kickers Offenbach.
