= Blues Highway (film) =

1994 film

- Directed by: Bill Guttentag; Vince DiPersio
- Written by: Vince DiPersio; Bill Guttentag
- Produced by: Vince DiPersio; Bill Guttentag
- Edited by: Jason Rosenfield
- Production companies: Half Court Pictures; National Geographic Explorer
- Distributed by: TBS
- Release date: 1994
- Country: United States
- Language: English

Blues Highway is a 1994 American short documentary film directed by Bill Guttentag and Vince DiPersio. It was nominated for an Academy Award for Best Documentary Short.
