= Jason Nikas =

American actor and model (1972–2023)

- Born: Patryk Strait; August 17, 1972; Arcadia, California, U.S.
- Died: September 18, 2023 (aged 51); Las Vegas, Nevada, U.S.
- Other names: Johnny Guitar; Ann Drogeny
- Occupations: Actor; Model; Production designer
- Years active: 1992–2012
- Agent: Falcon Studios

Jason Nikas (August 17, 1972 – September 18, 2023), born Patryk Strait, was an American adult film actor, model, and production designer. Recognized during the 1990s and 2000s for his blonde hair, lean muscular build, and "twink" aesthetic, Nikas was a highly versatile figure in the adult entertainment industry. Over a career spanning two decades, he worked on more than 120 titles as a performer, assistant director, camera operator, and special effects technician.

Beyond general hardcore features, Nikas was a notable figure in early bisexual and transgender adult cinema, frequently performing under a variety of aliases, including Johnny Guitar and Ann Drogeny.

== Early life ==
Nikas was born Patryk Strait on August 17, 1972, in Arcadia, California. He began his career in the adult entertainment industry in the early 1990s, initially utilizing his distinct blonde hair and athletic physique to secure work as a print model. He appeared in numerous still photography layouts, gay erotic publications, and adult magazines.

== Career ==
Nikas made his film debut in Hunk Hunt 26 for Leisure Time Productions. In his early career, he was primarily marketed as a bottom "twink" performer, often working under the pseudonyms Johnny Guitar and Jason Wikes. During this period, he collaborated with veteran adult film director Paul Barresi and major industry studios such as All Worlds Video, Vivid Video, Studio 2000, and He/She Studios.

=== Bisexual and Transgender Cinema ===
As his career progressed, Nikas became a prominent performer in bisexual and transgender adult subgenres. He explored his trans expression on-camera under the pseudonyms Ann Drogeny and Ann Drojenny (a play on androgyny), performing as a pre-operative trans woman.

He established a long-term creative partnership with performer and director Karen Dior. Together, they made several groundbreaking trans-themed adult titles, including Gender Trans-Scender, Melrose Trannie, She Male Voyager, That Dick's Got Tits, Trannie Angel, and You've Got She-Male. As a bisexual performer, he was also featured in major titles such as Bi Claudius, Bi the Rear Window, The Bi Valley, Bi Curious George, and Bi-Nanza.

=== Production and behind-the-scenes work ===
Operating under his birth name, Patryk Strait, Nikas transitioned into a prolific behind-the-scenes role. He worked as an assistant director, camera operator, and model coordinator.

Director Kevin Clarke noted that Nikas was instrumental in the production of Something Very Big for Odyssey Men, handling camerawork and model management. Nikas was also celebrated for his technical ingenuity; he designed and executed the special effects miniature sequence for Karen Dior's award-winning adult parody Bi-Tannic: The Ship Where Everyone Goes Down, engineering the mechanics of how the prop ship would sink on camera.

Additionally, Nikas was hired by Sabin, the publisher of the Gay Video Guide, to manage subscriptions for the publication and assist in the live production of the Gay Video Awards Shows for AIDS. He also worked behind the scenes for the softcore gay adult companies GreenWood Cooper and 10 Percent, as well as Jaguar and Barry Knight productions in New York.

== Death ==
Nikas retired from active film production around 2012, though his performances continued to be featured in retrospective industry compilations for another decade. Following a long battle with cancer, Nikas died on September 18, 2023, in Las Vegas, Nevada, at the age of 51, with his mother and sister by his side.

== Filmography ==
=== Film ===
Year	Title	Role	Notes
1993	Jur Ass In the Park	Jason Nikas	Debut
1993	Hot Things	Jason Nikas	
1993	Fantasies 1	Jason Nikas	
1994	Trannie Get Your Gun	Ann Drogeny	
1994	New in Town (Surfside)	Jason Nikas	
1994	Fast Moves	Jason Nikas	
1994	Hawaiian Dreams	Jason Nikas	
1994	Bedroom Buddies	Jason Nikas	
1994	Wild Bill	Jason Nikas	
1994	Secret Rituals of the Westside Boys	Jason Nikas	
1994	Wet Dreams	Jason Nikas	
1994	Hip Hop Hunks	Jason Nikas	
1994	Friendly Desire	Jason Nikas	
1994	In the Penthouse	Jason Nikas	
1994	Open Windows	Jason Nikas	
1994	Playing Dirty (Millenium)	Jason Nikas	
1994	Dungeons and Drag Queens	Johnny Gitaur	
1994	Bi the Rear Window	Johnny Guitar	
1994	Big Sticks	Johnny Guitar	
1994	The Bi Valley	Jonny Gitaur	
1995	A Jock's Tale	Jason Nikas	
1995	All About Sex	Jason Nikas	
1995	No Faking It	Jason Nikas	
1995	Pinball Wizard (Surfside)	Jason Nikas	
1995	Summer Money	Jason Nikas	
1995	Wet Dreamer (Odyssey)	Jason Nikas	
1995	Nasty Rumors	Jason Nikas	
1995	San Francisco Sex	Jason Nikas	
1995	Summer Seduction	Jason Nikas	
1995	Cyber-Sex	Jason Nikas	
1995	Paradise Inn	Jason Nikas	
1995	Cowboy Hustlers	Jason Nikas	
1995	Boys Do It!!	Jason Nikas	
1995	Force of Nature	Jason Nikas	
1995	Total Deception	Jason Nikas	
1995	Whitefire	Jason Nikas	
1995	Back in the Saddle Again	Jason Nikas	
1995	Hard Labor	Jason Nikas	
1995	Hustler Alley	Jason Nikas	
1995	Rookie Rookie	Jason Nikas	
1995	His First Time	Jason Nikas	
1995	Hidden Agenda	Jason Nikas	
1995	Nymphomania	Jason Nikas	
1995	Gay Video Guide Porn Star Softball Game	Jason Nikas	
1995	Coming Out Party	Jason Nikas	
1995	Risky Sex	Jason Nikas	
1995	Hairy Hunks (Stallion)	Johnny Guitar	
1995	Fresh Buns 11	Johnny Guitar	
1995	Jet Streams	Johnny Guitar	
1995	Melrose Trannie	Jonny Guitar	
1996	Transsexual Encounters	Ann Drojenny	
1996	Camp Pokahiney	Jason Nikas	
1996	Deeper & Deeper (Tasteless)	Jason Nikas	
1996	Hard Corps (Hunter)	Jason Nikas	
1996	Dreaming of You	Jason Nikas	
1996	Zebra Love	Jason Nikas	
1996	The Other Man	Jason Nikas	
1996	I Am Curious Leather	Jason Nikas	
1996	Mr. Blue	Jason Nikas	
1996	On to Something Big	Jason Nikas	
1996	Sex and the Single Man	Jason Nikas	
1996	Sudden Urge	Jason Nikas	
1996	First Timer	Jason Nikas	
1996	Foreign Xchange	Jason Nikas	
1996	Goodfellas Badfellas	Jason Nikas	
1996	Palm Springs Cruisin'	Jason Nikas	
1996	Sex Toy Story 1	Jason Nikas	
1996	Cum Stories to Tell	Jason Nikas	
1996	3-Some	Jason Nikas	
1996	Hung Jury 1: 12 Horny Men	Jason Nikas	
1996	Boys of Big Sur	Jason Nikas	
1996	Interviews (Inferno), Jamie Hendrix's	Jason Nikas	
1996	Transsexual Encounters	Johnny Gitaur	
1996	Boy Toys 1 (Stallion)	Johnny Guitar	
1996	Blonde Beach Boys 2	Johnny Guitar	
1996	Hunk Hunt 17	Johnny Guitar	
1996	Bi the Book	Jonny Guitar	
1997	Tailspin	Jason Nikas	
1997	Below the Decks	Jason Nikas	
1997	Iron Cage	Jason Nikas	
1997	In the Shadows	Jason Nikas	
1997	Threesome	Jason Nikas	
1997	Tempted	Jason Nikas	
1997	Backdoor Hammer in the Slammer: Balls to the Wall 27	Jason Nikas	
1997	Bad to the Bone: Balls to the Wall 28	Jason Nikas	
1997	Hunk Hunt 30	Jason Nikas	
1997	Beverly Hills Bondage Club 2	Jason Nikas	
1997	Pounding Asses	Jason Nikas	
1997	Male Practice	Jason Nikas	
1997	Back Alley Boys	Jason Nikas	
1997	Bad Ass Lieutenant	Jason Nikas	
1997	Bathroom Cruisers	Jason Nikas	
1997	Man to Man: Wanna Start Something?	Jason Nikas	
1997	GoodFellas BadFellas	Billy Valentine	
1997	Rough Rider	Jason Nikas	
1997	Working Stiff	Jason Nikas	
1997	Dirty Boys	Johnny Guitar	
1997	Every Inch A Man	Johnny Guitar	
1997	Sex in Public Places 2	Johnny Guitar	
1998	Billy 2000: Billy Goes Hollywood	Jason Nikas	
1998	Always Available	Jason Nikas	
1998	Sands Storms	Jason Nikas	
1998	HIStoric Affairs	Jason Nikas	
1998	As Big as It Gets (Hollywood)	Jason Nikas	
1998	Sands Blasted	Jason Nikas	
1998	Size Does Matter (Hollywood)	Jason Nikas	
1998	Marine Obsessions	Jason Nikas	
1998	One Way or the Other	Jason Nikas	
1998	You've Got the Touch	Jason Nikas	
1998	Something Very Big	Jason Nikas	
1998	Cramming for the Big One	Jason Nikas	
1998	Wanna Be in Pictures?	Jason Nikas	
1998	Relentless	Jason Nikas	
1998	HIStoric Affairs	Redcoat Soldier	
1998	The Underboss	Jason Nikas	
1998	Guys with a Rise	Jason Nikas	
1998	How to Give Pleasure to a Man... By a Man	Jason Nikas	
1998	Viz: Hungarian for Water	Jason Nikas	
1998	Bi-Tannic: The Ship Where Everyone Goes Down	Patryk Strait	
1998	Queen for a Day	Johnny Gitaur	
1998	Trannie Bootie	Johnny Gitaur	
1998	She Male Transgression	Johnny Gitaur	
1998	Gender Trans-Scender	Ann Drogeny	
1998	She Male Voyager	Ann Drogeny	
1998	That Dick's Got Tits	Ann Drogeny	
1998	Trannie Angel	Ann Drogeny	
1998	You've Got She-Male	Ann Drogeny	
1998	Bi Claudius	Jason Nikas	
1998	Bi Curious George	Jason Nikas	
1998	Bi-Nanza	Jason Nikas	
1999	West Hollywood Hope	Leon C. Pettybone	
1999	Analized	Jason Nikas	
1999	Nubian Princes	Jason Nikas	
1999	Pool of Desire	Narrator	
1999	Tom Dickin' Harry	Jason Nikas	
1999	Fantasies and Adventures 1	Jason Nikos	
2000	Rump Riders (Regiment)	Jason Nikas	
2000	Strapped	Jason Nikas	
2000	So That's How You Want It	Jason Nikas	
2000	Bi-Force	Jason Nikas	
2000	The Underboss	Sonny Champa	
2000	Angelic Hustler	Jason Nikas	
2000	Extreme Sex Offenders Case No. 01-04	Jason Nikas	
2001	Mixing It Up	Jason Nikas	
2001	Here Cums Santa Clause	Jason Nikas	
2001	Quasarman	Jason Nikas	
2001	Warehouse Horndog	Jason Nikas	
2001	Pig Boy Confessions 1	Jason Nikas	
2002	Navy Seals	Jason Nikas	
2002	The Confused Bisexual	Jason Nikas	
2002	My Cock Your Mouth	Jason Nikas	
2002	Dirty Boys	Johnny Guitar	
2003	Bear Ass	Jason Nikas	
2003	Beverly Hills Cock	Johnny Guitar	
2004	The XXX-Men	Jason Nikas	
2004	Love Those Twinks 1	Jason Nikas	
2004	Rock Out with My Jock Out	Jason Nikas	
2004	Blonde & Buff	Johnny Guitar	
2004	Bi Accident (BiNow)	Jonny Gitaur	
2005	Virgin Asses 4	Jason Nikas	
2006	1st Time Cocksuckers 4	Jason Nikas	
2008	The Adventures of Ass Man	Jason Nikas	
2011	Dads Down and Dirty 4	Jason Nikas	
2011	Dads Down and Dirty 5	Jason Nikas	
2021	Sweet Young Boys	Jason Nikas	
2022	Bi and Bizarre	Jason Nikas	

== Awards and nominations ==
Year	Award	Category	Work	Result	Ref
1998	GayVN Awards	Billy 2000: Billy Goes Hollywood	Best Performer	Nominated	
2000	GayVN Awards	Best Non-Sex Performance	West Hollywood Hope	Nominated	

== Legacy ==
Following his passing, several adult industry veterans published tributes to his character. Publisher Sabin described him as an exceptionally reliable, fun, and conscientious colleague, noting his personal passion for collecting obscure Madonna recordings and concert bootlegs. Director Kevin Clarke and journalist Billy Masters publicly praised Nikas for his protective mentorship of younger performers, noting that he frequently intervened to help models in financial or personal distress without expecting anything in return.
