= Jason Scott (disambiguation) =

Jason Scott (born 1970) is an American archivist and historian of technology.

Jason Scott may also refer to:

- Jason Scott (rower) (born 1970), American Olympic rower
- Jason Lee Scott, fictional character played by Austin St. John on the children's television series Power Rangers
- Jason Scott Lee (born 1966), American actor and martial artist
- Jason Scott, former member of Life Tabernacle Church and plaintiff in the Jason Scott case against anti-cult activist Rick Ross and the Cult Awareness Network
- Jason Scott, musician for the Australian band Coloured Stone
- Jason Scott, plot-writer for computer games whose credits include the 1999 FreeSpace 2
