= Jason Christophe White =

- Genres: Theater
- Occupations: Actor. Playwright, Producer, Director
- Years active: 2003–09

Jason Christophe White is an NAACP Theater Award-winning American playwright, his one produced play being The Dance: The History of American Minstrelsy, which he co-wrote and co-directed with Aaron White (no relation). Jason White is also the co-owner of In Tha Cut Productions.

He is a graduate of The California Institute of the Arts, where he received a BFA in Acting in 2004.

== Plays ==
- The Dance: The History of American Minstrelsy (2005) (Co-Director)

== Awards ==
In 2007, White shared an NAACP award for “Best Playwright” with Aaron White for The Dance: The History of American Minstrelsy. The production has garnered the support of Harry Belafonte, KCET and others.
