= ManvsGame =

American broadcaster

Jayson Love
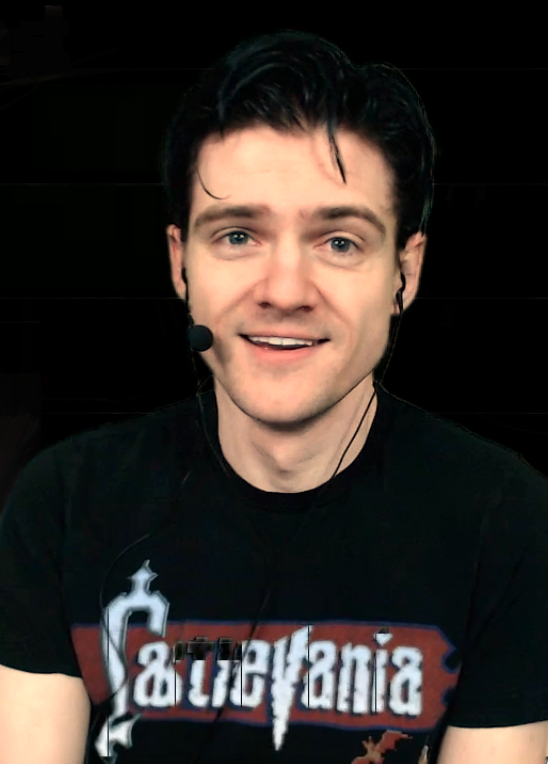
- Born: Billings, Montana
- Other name: Man
- Occupations: Broadcaster, Entertainer, Internet Personality
- Known for: MANvsGAME

Jayson Love, better known by his stagename Man, stylized MAN, is a former Twitch streamer. He is best known for live streaming video games on the sites Justin.tv and Twitch on the channel MANvsGAME.

Love graduated from Minnesota State University in East Asian studies, focused on Japanese language and culture in 2005.

Love started broadcasting on Justin.tv in between odd jobs under the name Man vs Game from a studio in the basement of his home in Montana. He uses a green screen to superimpose himself over the footage of the game he is playing. Early 2013, when the show began to suffice as Love's sole source of income, he quit his other job and became a full-time professional broadcaster. In 2013, he expected it to be possible to receive an income of over $100,000 for 2014 from advertisement and subscription revenue.

The Daily Dot's Kevin Moris describes the appeal of the show in Love's ability to interact with his viewers, and the personal atmosphere he creates.
