= Death of Jason Hughes =

Incident regarding death of American high school teacher

On March 6, 2026, 40-year-old American high school teacher Jason Hughes was killed at his home in Hall County, Georgia during a prank carried out by students. The incident occurred when a group of students came to Hughes' home as part of a prank involving toilet paper. During the encounter, Hughes was struck by a vehicle as the students attempted to leave. One student was initially charged in connection with the death, while others faced misdemeanor charges. All charges were later dropped following requests from Hughes' family.

== Background ==
Hughes was a math teacher at North Hall High School in Gainesville, Georgia. He had worked at the school for several years and was known within the local community.

== Death ==
On March 6, five students arrived at Hughes' home and began wrapping a tree near the house with toilet paper. The act was part of a common student prank often referred to as toilet papering, in which objects are covered with toilet paper. When Hughes exited the house to speak with them, the students attempted to leave in their vehicles. As they drove away, Hughes tripped into the road and was struck by one of the vehicles. The students attempted to render first aid until emergency responders arrived.

== Aftermath ==
Following Hughes' death, police charged one student with first-degree vehicular homicide. The other four were charged with misdemeanors of criminal trespassing and littering on private property. After Hughes' family urged that charges be dismissed, authorities dropped all charges against the involved students.

The driver of the pickup truck was identified as 18-year-old Jayden Ryan Wallace, who was arrested and charged with vehicular manslaughter before the charges were dropped a week later.
