= Jason Day (disambiguation) =

Jason Day (born 1987) is an Australian professional golfer.

Jason Day may also refer to:

- Jason Day (actor) (born 1985), Peruvian actor
- Jason Day (fighter) (born 1981), Canadian mixed martial artist
- Jason Day (rower) (born 1970), Australian Olympic rower
