= Jason McCartney =

Jason McCartney may refer to:

- Jason McCartney (politician) (born 1968), Member of Parliament for Colne Valley UK Parliament constituency until June 2017
- Jason McCartney (footballer) (born 1974), former Australian rules footballer and coach of the AIS/AFL Academy
- Jason McCartney (cyclist) (born 1973), American professional road racing cyclist
