= Jason Brook Kanarr =

American actor and model (1971–2006)

Kristian Brooks
- Born: Jason Brook Kanarr; March 12, 1971; Englewood, Colorado, U.S.
- Died: September 1, 2006 (aged 35); Custer County, Colorado, U.S.
- Other names: Christian Brooks; Cristian Brocks
- Occupations: Actor; Model
- Years active: 1996–2006
- Agent: Falcon Studios

Jason Brook Kanarr (March 12, 1971 – September 1, 2006), better known by his stage name Kristian Brooks, was an American adult film actor and model who achieved prominence in gay adult cinema and print erotica during the late 1990s and early 2000s. Known for his athletic, muscular swimmer's build, blond hair, and blue eyes, Brooks appeared in more than 35 adult films and was a frequently featured model in prominent gay lifestyle and adult magazines.

== Early life ==
Jason Brook Kanarr was born on March 12, 1971, in Englewood, Colorado to Robert W. Kanarr and Wanda L. Bruce. He grew up in Colorado alongside his brother, Jeremy.

As a young adult, Kanarr developed a highly defined, muscular physique often described in industry media as a "swimmer's build". He stood 5 feet 10 inches (178 cm) tall, with natural blond hair and blue eyes. Outside of his later professional career, Kanarr was highly active in outdoor recreation and technical hobbies. His personal interests included traveling, camping, hiking, climbing, diving, and weightlifting. He also possessed a strong amateur interest in natural sciences and technology, specifically focusing on computers, zoology, and botany.

== Career ==
=== Print Modeling (1996) ===
Before entering the adult film industry, Kanarr established himself as a model in gay print media. Utilizing his athletic build and "all-American" aesthetic, he worked extensively with physique photographers. Throughout his late teens and early twenties, he appeared in professional solo layouts, still photography sets, and centerfolds for various gay lifestyle, erotica, and adult magazines. He continued to balance high-profile print modeling concurrently with his later film work.

=== Adult Film Career (1997–2001) ===
In 1997, at the age of 26, Kanarr transitioned into video performances, adopting the stage name Kristian Brooks. Throughout his career, his name was occasionally alternate-spelled or stylized by various production houses under the aliases Christian Brooks and Cristian Brocks.

Brooks was noted within the industry for his versatility, performing as both a "top" and a "bottom". He worked frequently with major adult film studios of the era, most notably All Worlds Video, which was one of the largest production companies in the gay adult market during the late 1990s. Over the course of his career, he accumulated over 35 film credits.

On production sets, Brooks was regarded by peers as charismatic and highly talkative. Columnist, editor, and adult industry figure JC Adams, who worked alongside Brooks on the set of the 1999 film Dream Team, recalled him as "talkative, bright and always [having] an anecdote related to his sexcapades that had the cast and crew in stitches". During his peak popularity in his early twenties, Brooks famously claimed an estimated personal "body count" of 3,000 individuals—an anecdote that his contemporary industry coworkers reportedly considered entirely plausible.

=== Later life ===
Kanarr was diagnosed as HIV-positive during an era when antiretroviral therapies were evolving but remained complex to access or manage. In the latter portion of his performing career, he made a limited number of bareback (unprotected sex) film appearances.

After retiring from the entertainment industry, Kanarr lived for a period in San Diego, California, before returning to his native home of Colorado.

== Death ==
He spent his time under hospice care in Custer County, Colorado, where he succumbed to AIDS-related complications on September 1, 2006, at the age of 35.

A cenotaph and permanent memorial marker dedicated to Kanarr and his younger brother Jeremy, who died in a car accident in 1989 at age 16, sit at the Littleton Cemetery in Arapahoe County, Colorado.

== Filmography ==
=== Film ===
Year	Title	Role	Notes
1997	Exit from Exxxodus	Christian Brooks	Debut
1997	Ramrod	Christian Brooks	
1997	Eatin' Crackers In Bed	Christian Brooks	
1997	Lambda Lambda Lambda 1	Kristian Brooks	
1997	Family Values	Teddy	
1997	Summer Reunion	Kristian Brooks	
1997	Forest Rump	Kristian Brooks	
1997	Reform School Confidential	Inmate	
1997	Hotter Than Life	Kristian Brooks	
1997	Maximum Cruise	Kristian Brooks	
1997	Fine Daze	Kristian Brooks	
1997	Tales from the Backlot 2	Kristian Brooks	
1997	The Hitchhiker	Dane Hodges	
1997	Chasers	Kristian Brooks	
1997	Tank Tops	Kristian Brooks	
1997	High Tide	Orgy Guy	
1997	Hard Core	Porn Star	
1998	A Lesson Learned	Kristian Brooks	
1998	Das Butt 2: All Hands on Dick	Ensign Brooks	
1998	Time Cops	Cowboy	
1998	Manhungry	Kristian Brooks	
1998	Fever	Kristian Brooks	
1998	The Dream Time	Dwight	
1998	Mountain Patrol: Hot Cops Series 2	Kristian Brooks	
1998	Getting Straight	Greg	
1999	Hotel California	Kristian Brooks	
1999	Summer Reunion	Kristian Brooks	
1999	Richie's Finest	Kristian Brooks	
1999	The Best of Cole Tucker	Kristian Brooks	
1999	Love Inn Exile	Kristian Brooks	
1999	West Hollywood Hope	Intern	
1999	Dream Team	Kristian Brooks	
2000	Prague Rising	Kristian Brooks	
2001	Erotic Cuts 2	Kristian Brooks	
2001	At Your Service 1	Kristian Brooks	
2001	The 4 H Club	Kristian Brooks	
2001	Office Equipment	Christian Brooks	
2002	Barely Legal Young Men on Campus	Kristian Brooks	
2002	Huge Fucking Cocks	Kristian Brooks	
2006	Bareback Boot Camp	New Recruit Kristian	
2006	The Best of Tom Chase 1	Kristian Brooks	
2006	The Best of Travis Wade 1	Kristian Brooks	
2006	The Best of Brennan Foster	Kristian Brooks	
2007	Young Frat House Sex	Kristian Brooks	
2009	Shower Tail	Kristian Brooks	Posthumous release
2009	Steel Rods	Kristian Brooks	Posthumous release
2009	The Best of Colby Taylor 3	Kristian Brooks	Posthumous release
2010	Falcon All Star Cum Shots 2	Kristian Brooks	Posthumous release
2021	Falcon Icons: The 1990s	Kristian Brooks	Posthumous release

== Awards and nominations ==
Year	Award	Category	Work	Result	Ref
1998	GayVN Awards	Time Cops	Best Group Scene	Nominated	
