= Jason Watkins (disambiguation) =

Jason Watkins (born 1962) is a British stage, film and television actor.

Jason Watkins may also refer to:

- Jason Watkins (American football) (born 1985), American football offensive tackle
- Jason Watkins (politician), Republican member of the Kansas House of Representatives
