= Jason Hyland =

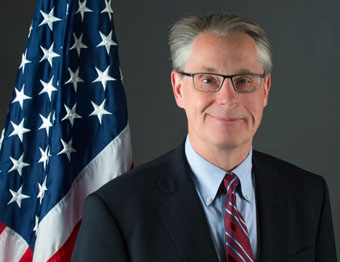

United States Ambassador to Japan
- Acting
- In office January 18, 2017 – July 31, 2017
- President: Barack Obama; Donald Trump
- Preceded by: Caroline Kennedy
- Succeeded by: William F. Hagerty

Personal details
- Born: New York City, New York, U.S.
- Parents: Carl A. Hyland (father); Elizabeth Ann "Betty" Hyland (mother)
- Education: University of California, Berkeley (BA); National Defense University (MS); The Fletcher School of Law and Diplomacy (MA)
- Awards: Superior Honor Award; Expeditionary Service Award; Meritorious Honor Award; Sinclaire Language Award

Jason P. Hyland is Senior Advisor at Dentons Global Advisors - Albright Stonebridge Group and based in Tokyo, Japan. He was previously President & Representative Officer of MGM Resorts Japan LLC and a former American diplomat who served as the acting United States Ambassador to Japan. He was deputy to Ambassador Caroline Kennedy and assumed the position of Charge d'Affaires upon her departure on January 18, 2017, until July 31, 2017. As Deputy Chief of Mission for the United States Embassy in Tokyo,, Hyland was involved in the organization of President Barack Obama's May 2016 historic visit to Hiroshima and attended the ceremony. He wrote about his impressions of the event in his blog in the US Embassy's American View online magazine.

He has previously served as Deputy Chief of Mission of US Embassy Canberra, Australia, and US Embassy Baku, Azerbaijan; as Director of the Office of South Central European Affairs; and as Special Assistant for East Asian and Pacific Affairs in the US Department of State. He arrived in Tokyo on June 30, 2014, to assume his duties as Deputy Chief of Mission, following his assignment as Foreign Policy Advisor for the Combined Joint Task Force – Horn of Africa. He has lived and worked in Asia for more than 18 years. He received a Group Superior Honor Award from the Department of State for serving on the first Embassy team that entered Kobe in February 1995 to assist after the Great Hanshin earthquake.

Hyland was born in New York and raised in New York and California. His mother, Elizabeth Ann "Betty" Hyland, was an author. He obtained his AB in History from the University of California, Berkeley, and also studied at the National War College (Master of Science in National Security Strategy), The Fletcher School of Law and Diplomacy (Master of Arts in Law and Diplomacy), and the Inter-University Center for Japanese Language Studies. He was also Visiting Foreign Scholar at the University of Tokyo, from 1994 to 1995. The Fletcher School of Law and Diplomacy appointed him Senior Strategic Fellow in September 2017. He became a Member of the Board of Overseers of Temple University, Japan Campus in March 2018. He is fluent in Japanese, and proficient in Ukrainian and other languages. Hyland is the recipient of numerous US Department of State awards, including the Superior Honor Award, Meritorious Honor Award and Sinclaire Language Award. He received both the Superior Honor Award and Expeditionary Service Award for his contributions as Provincial Reconstruction Team Leader in Mosul, Iraq, 2007-2008.

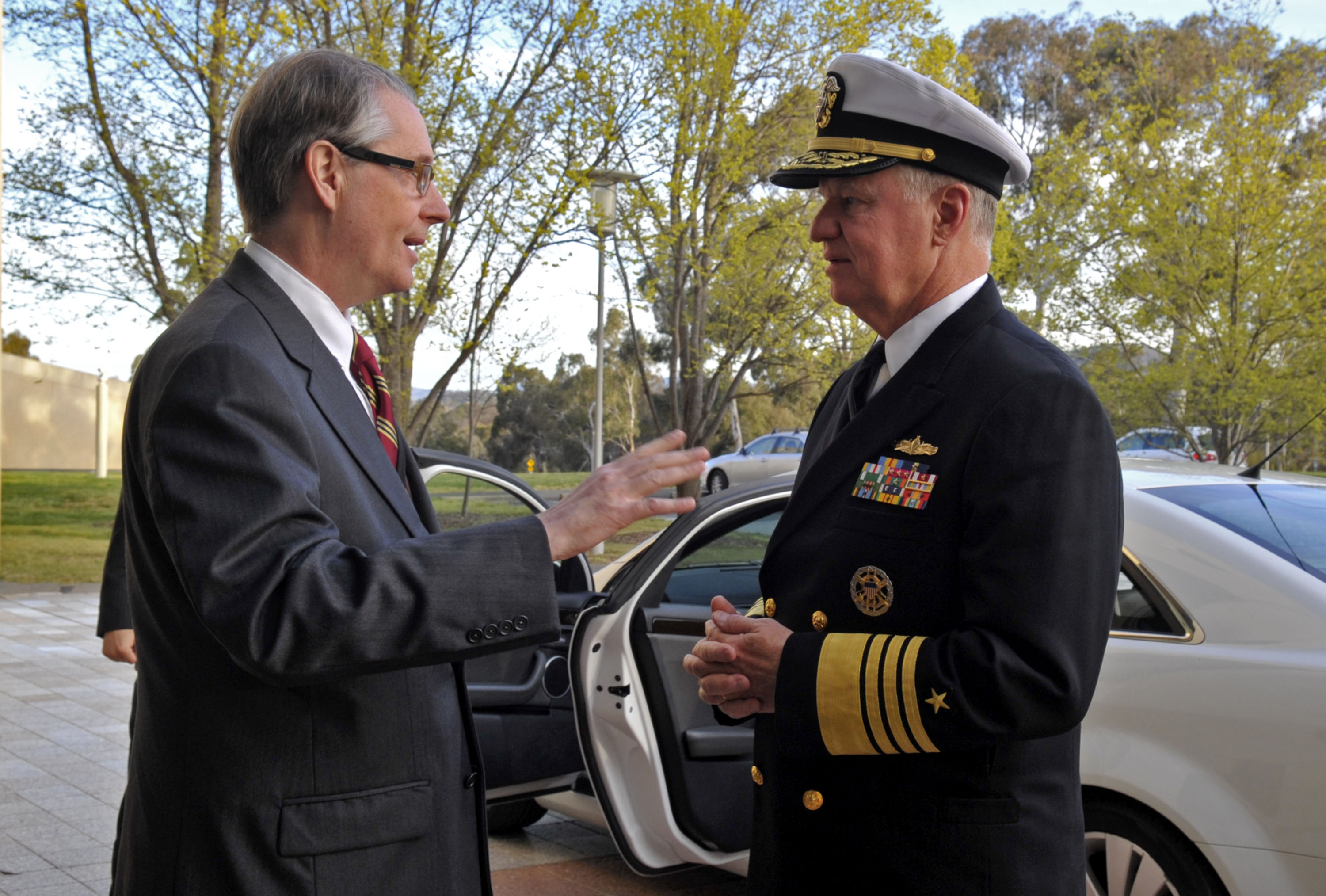
Chief of Naval Operations (CNO) Adm. Gary Roughead meets with DCM Jason Hyland in Canberra, Australia

Diplomatic posts
Preceded by Caroline Kennedy	United States Ambassador to Japan; Acting; 2017	Succeeded by William F. Hagerty
