= Jason Pratensis =

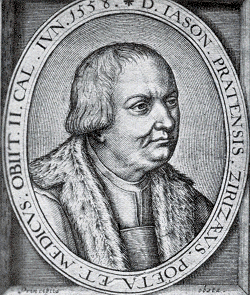
Engraving of Jason Pratensis (1486-1558)

Jason Pratensis (Iasonis Van Der Velde, 1486 – 22 May 1558) was a Southern Netherlandish humanist physician and poet. His work De cerebri morbis, which Pratensis published in Basel like his contemporaries Desiderius Erasmus and Andreas Vesalius, is often considered to be the first textbook purely focused on Neurology. He practised in Zierikzee. He Latinized his Dutch name Jason van der Velde by converting it into Pratensis. Pratensis is also known under the names Van der Meersche and Van Praet.

== Early life ==
Pratensis was probably born in Ghent or in its immediate vicinity. He was probably educated at the University of Leuven, after which he settled in Zierikzee in 1514. Pratensis was then alternately active in Zierikzee and Veere. Between 1549 and 1554 he served as alderman at Veere. He may have lived briefly in Goes in the meantime.

Pratensis was the personal physician to the Lords of Zandenburg. Pratensis was also the personal physician of the Dutch nobleman Maximilian II of Burgundy, Marquis van Veere. Pratensis dedicated his work De tuenda sanitateto him.

== Career ==
Van der Velde wrote several medical works, in which he incorporated the medical principles as described by Greek, Roman and Arab authors, such as Hippocrates and Claudius Galenus. His medical works are in the fields of neurology, obstetrics and gynecology.

Pratensis was aware, for example, that tremors did not require arbitrary movement and that tremors of the head occurred even when patients tried to keep it still ( Neq; necessarium est, ut semper movendi studium interveniat, quibusdam nimirum caput intremiscit, quum id non commotum, sed maxime quietum vellent,... ). In the rest of the 33-chapter book, Pratensis wrote about tetanus, among other things, dizziness, epilepsy, amnesia and hemicrania (one-sided headache, usually migraine ), as well as drunkenness, stupidity, mania and melancholy. In doing so, he built in particular on the disease concepts, the pathogenesis and the treatment of the disorders as already described in Greek, Roman and Arab antiquity, supplemented with new Renaissance concepts from astrology and pharmacy. and only a few new clinical observations. What was striking about his description of mania was that while he did not consider it impossible for the devil to play a role, Pratensis paid no attention to possible religious or spiritual treatments for the disorder.

Because of the adherence to the ancient principles of medicine, Pratensis' works are seen as not very progressive in terms of content, from a medical-historical point of view, compared to the works of later doctors from the Low Countries. The works are mainly meaningful thanks to the Renaissance Latin in which they are written. After Pratensis' death, there were different opinions about his achievements. Pieter van Foreest described Pratensis as a physician suo tempore magni nominis doctissimus, a physician who was a famous and extraordinarily learned man in his day. Albrecht von Haller was already less enthusiastic about Pratensis, followed by Nicolas François Joseph Eloy(1714-1788) who even accused him of incredulity.

== Writing ==
Poetically, Pratensis' oeuvre was limited to Sylva carminum adolescentiae, published in 1530, in which he collected his Neo-Latin youth poems. This collection of poems consists of four parts, the first two of which mainly contain moralistic and philosophical songs. The third part also includes occasional poetry, while the last part includes religious songs, highlighting his devout Catholic faith and aversion to Lutheranism. Pratensis dedicated the booklet to his son Thomas, because of his early interest in poetry, Pratensis reminded that he still had verses from when he was the same age as his son.

== Works ==
- Libri duo de uteris, Antwerp, 1524
- De pariente de partu, Antwerp, 1527
- Sylva carminum adolescentiae, Antwerp, 1530
- De arcenda sterilitate et progignendis liberis Antwerp, 1531
- The cerebri morbis, Heinrich Petri, Basel, 1549
- Den Rosegaert vanden beuruchten women (together with Eucharius Rösslin de Jonge ), Jan Mathijszoon Amsterdam, 1555 (part of Libri duo de uteris included)
- De tuenda sanitate apud Ioannem Withagium, Antwerp, 1538
