= Timeline of LGBTQ history in South Africa =

This is a timeline of notable events in the history of lesbian, gay, bisexual and transgender people in South Africa.

== 1900s ==
=== 1907 ===
- J. Glenn Leary and Henry M. Taberer are tasked with investigating reports of “unnatural practices” among African men working in mine compounds near Johannesburg. The Taberer report finds that homosexual activity is occurring among some mine workers and pathologizes such activity as “disgusting” and “loathsome.”

== 1940s ==
=== 1948 ===
- The National Party is elected in South Africa. They begin enacting changes to the Immorality Act targeted at LGBTQ people. These changes were heavily enforced by the police and used to harass, blackmail, and arrest LGBTQ people.

== 1960s ==
=== 1966 ===
- January – The Forest Town raid: police raid a gay party attended by about 300 people in Forest Town, a suburb of Johannesburg, on January 22, 1966. This attracts much public and political attention, leading in 1969 to an extension of the criminalisation of male homosexuality. The raid led to the arrest of nine men for a variety of charges including masquerading as women and "gross indecency." One of the people arrested was Michele Bruno, a South African drag queen.

=== 1969 ===
- 21 May – The Immorality Amendment Act, 1969 introduces Section 20A, the infamous "men at a party" clause, which criminalised all sexual acts committed between men "at a party", where "party" is defined as any occasion where more than two people are present. The amendment also raised the age of consent for male homosexual activity from 16 to 19, although "sodomy" and "unnatural acts" were already criminal. Openly gay nationalist composer Hubert du Plessis appears before Parliament to protest the tightening of anti-homosexuality laws. It includes amendments aimed at "[prohibiting] the manufacture, sale or supply of any article which is intended to be used to perform an unnatural sexual act" and "[prohibiting] acts between male persons and which are calculated to stimulate sexual passion or to give sexual gratification."

== 1970s ==
=== 1971 ===
- Between 1971 and 1989, homosexual soldiers in the South African Defence Forces (SADF) were forced to submit to "curing" their homosexuality. See The Aversion Project. These medical torture methods included chemical castration and electroshock therapy.

== 1980s ==
=== 1981 ===
- The first major gay organization in South Africa , a white, non-political organization, Gay Association of South Africa was founded in response to the HIV/AIDS crisis.

=== 1987 ===
- In the country's 1987 general election, GASA and the gay magazine Exit endorsed the National Party candidate for Hillbrow, Leon de Beer. De Beer was the National Party's first candidate to address gay rights, and advertised for his campaign in Exit. It was the general opinion of the gay community of Hillbrow that their vote was the deciding factor in de Beer's ultimate victory.

=== 1988 ===
- 4 March – The Immorality Amendment Act, 1988 imposes an age of consent of 19 for lesbian sex, which had previously been unregulated by the law. This was higher than the age of 16 applying to heterosexual sex.
- Gay and Lesbian Organization of Witwatersrand (GLOW), a more inclusive LGBTQ activism group is formed by activist Simon Nkoli.

== 1990s ==
=== 1990 ===
- 13 October – The first pride parade in South Africa was held in Johannesburg.

=== 1994 ===
- 27 April – The Interim Constitution comes into force. It includes a clause explicitly prohibiting discrimination on the basis of sexual orientation, giving LGBT South Africans legal protection for the first time. A subsequent court decision in 1998 will establish that the crime of sodomy was legally invalid from this date.

=== 1997 ===
- 4 February – The final Constitution comes into force, including the same anti-discrimination protections as the Interim Constitution.
- The GALA Queer Archive (previously known as "Gay and Lesbian Memory in Action", and "Gay and Lesbian Archives of South Africa"), was founded as an offshoot of the South African History Archives.

=== 1998 ===
- 8 May – In the case of National Coalition for Gay and Lesbian Equality v Minister of Justice, a judge of the Witwatersrand Local Division of the High Court declares the criminalisation of sodomy and "unnatural sexual acts", and section 20A of the Sexual Offences Act, to be unconstitutional for violating the anti-discrimination clause of the Constitution.
- 9 October – The Constitutional Court unanimously confirms the judgment of the High Court in the National Coalition case.
- 30 November – Gay rights and anti-apartheid activist Simon Nkoli dies of an AIDS-related secondary infection.

=== 1999 ===
- 12 February – In the case of National Coalition for Gay and Lesbian Equality v Minister of Home Affairs, three judges of the Cape Provincial Division of the High Court rule that it is unconstitutional for the government to provide immigration benefits to the foreign spouses of South Africans but not to the foreign same-sex partners of South Africans. The declaration of invalidity is suspended for one year to allow Parliament to correct the law.
- 2 December – The Constitutional Court unanimously confirms the judgment of the High Court in the second National Coalition case, but removes the suspension of the order and instead "reads in" words to the law to immediately extend immigration benefits to same-sex partners.

== 2000s ==
=== 2001 ===
- 25 September – In the case of Satchwell v President of the Republic of South Africa, a judge of the Transvaal Provincial Division of the High Court rules that financial benefits provided to the spouses of judges must also be provided to the same-sex life partners of judges.
- 28 September – In the case of Du Toit v Minister of Welfare and Population Development, a judge of the Transvaal Provincial Division rules that same-sex partners must be allowed to jointly adopt children and to adopt each other's children, a right which was previously limited to married spouses.

=== 2002 ===
- 25 July – The Constitutional Court unanimously confirms the judgment of the High Court in the Satchwell case, but modifies the order to limit the benefits to same-sex life partners who have undertaken "reciprocal duties of support".
- 10 September – The Constitutional Court unanimously confirms the judgment and order of the High Court in the Du Toit case.
- 18 October – In the case of Fourie v Minister of Home Affairs, a judge of the Transvaal Provincial Division dismisses the application of a lesbian couple to have their union recognised as a marriage on the grounds that they failed to attack the constitutionality of the Marriage Act.
- 31 October – In the case of J and B v Director General, Department of Home Affairs, a judge of the Durban & Coast Local Division of the High Court rules that a child born to a lesbian couple must be regarded as legitimate in law, and that both partners must be legally regarded as natural parents of the children and recorded as such on the birth register.

=== 2003 ===
- 28 March – The Constitutional Court unanimously confirms the judgment and order of the High Court in the J and B case.
- 31 July – The Constitutional Court refuses leave for a direct appeal in the Fourie case, directing that the appeal should instead be heard by the Supreme Court of Appeal.

=== 2004 ===
- 15 March – The Alteration of Sex Description and Sex Status Act, 2003 comes into force, allowing transsexual and intersex people to change their legally recognised sex.
- July – The Lesbian and Gay Equality Project launches a case in the Witwatersrand Local Division challenging the constitutionality of the provisions of the Marriage Act that limit marriage to opposite-sex couples.
- 30 November – A five-judge panel of the Supreme Court of Appeal hands down a judgment in the Fourie case. The majority of four rules that the common-law definition of marriage must be extended to include same-sex marriages but that such marriages cannot be solemnised in South Africa until the Marriage Act is amended, either by Parliament or by the Equality Project's application. The judgment is appealed to the Constitutional Court by both parties.

=== 2005 ===
- 11 March – The Chief Justice instructs that the Equality Project case will be heard by the Constitutional Court simultaneously with the Fourie case.
- 1 December – The Constitutional Court delivers its judgment in the Fourie and Equality Project cases (now known as Minister of Home Affairs v Fourie). The court rules that the common-law definition of marriage and the Marriage Act are unconstitutional because they do not allow same-sex couples to marry. The court suspends its order for one year to allow Parliament to rectify the discrimination.

=== 2006 ===
- 4 February – 19-year-old Zoliswa Nkonyana was stabbed and stoned to death in Khayelitsha for living openly as a lesbian.
- 31 March – In the case of Gory v Kolver NO, a judge of the Transvaal Provincial Division rules that a same-sex life partner is entitled to inherit from the intestate estate of the other partner as if they were married.
- August – The government rejects a call by the African Christian Democratic Party for a constitutional amendment to reverse the Constitutional Court's decision on same-sex marriage. Cabinet approves the introduction of the Civil Union Bill in Parliament.
- 13 September – The Civil Union Bill is introduced in the National Assembly. As originally drafted, the bill would provide for "civil partnerships", for same-sex couples only, which would have the same legal consequences as marriage but would not be called marriage.
- 14 November – The National Assembly passes the Civil Union Bill, with amendments to allow marriages or civil partnerships available to same-sex and opposite-sex couples, by 230 votes to 41.
- 23 November – The Constitutional Court confirms the judgment and order of the High Court in the Gory case.
- 28 November – The National Council of Provinces passes the Civil Union Bill by 36 votes to 11.
- 29 November – The Civil Union Act, 2006 is signed into law by Acting President Phumzile Mlambo-Ngcuka. This made South Africa the fifth country in the world and the first and only nation in Africa to have legalised same-sex marriage.
- 1 December – The first legal same-sex marriage is performed, in George.

=== 2007 ===
- 16 December – The Criminal Law (Sexual Offences and Related Matters) Amendment Act, 2007 comes into force, equalising the age of consent at 16; previously it had been 16 for heterosexual sex and 19 for homosexual sex.

=== 2008 ===
- Lynne Brown of the African National Congress is elected as the Premier of the Western Cape, becoming the first openly premier.
- 28 April – Banyana Banyana footballer and LGBT activist Eudy Simelane is raped and murdered in KwaThema in what is believed to be a hate crime.
- 31 March – In the case of Geldenhuys v National Director of Public Prosecutions, the Supreme Court of Appeal rules that the erstwhile difference in the age of consent was unconstitutional, notwithstanding that it has already been rectified by Parliament.
- 26 November – The Constitutional Court confirms the order of the Supreme Court of Appeal in the Geldenhuys case.

=== 2009 ===
- Mr Gay World South Africa pageant begins.

== 2010s ==
=== 2010 ===
- 18 December – A gay pride flag of South Africa is launched in Cape Town.

=== 2011 ===
- Mid-March – The establishment of a National Task Team (NTT) to address the issue of hate crimes against LGBT people such as corrective rape is mandated by then Minister of Justice Jeff Radebe.
- 24 April – LGBT activist Noxolo Nogwaza is raped and murdered in KwaThema, in what is described as a hate crime by Human Rights Watch and Amnesty International.

=== 2014 ===
- The Democratic Alliance's Zakhele Mbhele becomes the first openly gay Black Member of Parliament in South Africa and Africa.
- 29 April – The National Intervention Strategy for the LGBTI Sector developed by the NTT is launched by then Minister of Justice Jeff Radebe.
- 25 May – Lynne Brown becomes the first openly gay person to be appointed to a cabinet post in any African government.

=== 2015 ===
- Phuti Lekoloane came out and thus became South Africa's first openly gay male footballer.

=== 2017 ===
- Ten openly gay Members of Parliament take a group photo on the steps of Parliament. The group includes Marius Redelinghuys, Beyers Smit, Patrick Atkinson, Gordon Mackay, Dean Macpherson, Michael Cardo, Manuel de Freitas, Zakhele Mbhele, Ian Ollis and Mike Waters.

=== 2018 ===
- Laverne Cox became the first openly transgender person to appear on the cover of any Cosmopolitan magazine (specifically, Cosmopolitan South Africa's February 2018 issue).
- Lynne Brown resigns as a Member of Parliament after being excluded as a cabinet minister.

== 2020s ==
=== 2021 ===
- The Democratic Alliance's Chris Pappas is elected the mayor of the uMngeni Local Municipality in KwaZulu-Natal, becoming the first openly gay mayor in South Africa.

=== 2024 ===
- The Democratic Alliance's Martin Meyer is appointed Member of the Executive Council for Public Works and Infrastructure in KwaZulu-Natal, becoming the first openly gay MEC in the province.
- Internationally recognised LGBTIQ+ and HIV rights activist Steve Letsike is sworn in as a Member of Parliament for the ANC; she is soon after appointed Deputy Minister of Women, Youth, and Persons with Disabilities.

=== 2026 ===
- 11 January – Ilano became the first openly transgender contestant in the Big Brother Mzansi history, Big Brother Mzansi season 6.
- Deonay Balie becomes the first transgender woman to run for a Democratic Alliance national leadership position at the party's Federal Congress.
