= Timeline of African and diasporic LGBTQ history =

This is a timeline of notable events in the history of non-heterosexual conforming people of African ancestry, who may identify as LGBTIQGNC (lesbian, gay, bisexual, transgender, intersex, queer, third gender, gender nonconforming), men who have sex with men, or related culturally specific identities. This timeline includes events both in Africa, the Americas and Europe and in the global African diaspora, as the histories are very deeply linked.

== 1600s ==
=== 1672 ===
The Life and Struggles of Our Mother Wälättä P̣eṭros (1672) is the first reference of homosexuality between nuns in Ethiopian literature.

== 1700s ==
=== 1791 ===
France repeals its anti-"sodomy" law in all French-held territory, including Saint-Domingue (later Haiti), Martinique, Guadeloupe and French Guiana.

== 1800s ==
=== 1830 ===
- Brazil's anti-"sodomy" law is repealed under Emperor Pedro I of Brazil.

=== 1880s ===
- The Kabaka of Buganda, Mwanga II, assumes the throne of his country at age 16. He sets about to drive out Christianity, Islam and European influence from the kingdom, and executes several of his Christian-converted male pages who refuse his sexual advances.

== 1920s ==
=== 1924 ===
- December 24 – The Society for Human Rights, an advocacy organization for gay men, is chartered in Chicago; an African American clergyman named John T. Graves serves as the first and only president of the organization, and the organization publishes Friendship and Freedom, the first gay-interest publication in the United States. The Society collapses by the following summer.

== 1940s ==
=== 1948 ===
- 22 June – Ivor Cummings, an openly gay British civil servant with Sierra Leonean ancestry, welcomes the first immigrants of the Windrush generation, and his decisions on how to support them end up establishing Brixton as a modern hub for Britain's African Caribbean community. He is known as the "gay father of the Windrush generation."

== 1960s ==
=== 1960 ===
- Bayard Rustin, prominent gay activist who co-founded the Southern Christian Leadership Conference in 1957, is forced to resign from the organization by Rep. Adam Clayton Powell Jr. when he threatens to leak fake evidence of an affair with Martin Luther King Jr. Because of the threats, King also calls off a demonstration in front of the Democratic National Convention in Los Angeles, California, U.S.

=== 1962 ===
- James Baldwin publishes his novel Another Country, which intersects issues of race and sexual orientation.

=== 1963 ===
- At the behest of Asa Philip Randolph, Bayard Rustin co-organizes the March on Washington for Jobs and Freedom, despite Senator Strom Thurmond railing against him as a "Communist, draft-dodger, and homosexual" and having his entire Pasadena arrest file entered in the record. Despite his preference for behind-the-scenes work, Rustin becomes famous for his work. On September 6, 1963, a photograph of Rustin and Randolph appeared on the cover of Life magazine, identifying them as "the leaders" of the March.

=== 1969 ===
- Black and Latino queer people are among the majority of patrons at the Stonewall Inn who riot against a police raid, resulting in the beginning of the modern LGBT rights movement in the United States.

== 1970s ==
=== 1970 ===
- Marsha P. Johnson and Sylvia Rivera establish the gay and transvestite advocacy organization S.T.A.R. (Street Transvestite Action Revolutionaries).

=== 1972 ===
- Johnson and Rivera establish the S.T.A.R. house, the first shelter for gay and trans street kids, and paid the rent for it with money they made themselves as sex workers.
- July 1 – Ted Brown and the U.K. Gay Liberation Front organized the U.K.'s first Gay Pride Rally.

=== 1974 ===
- The Salsa Soul Sisters form from the Black Lesbian Caucus within the Gay Activists Alliance in New York, with the goal of supporting inclusion of lesbians of color, particularly Black and Latina lesbians. It is the oldest Black lesbian womanist organization in the United States.
- The newly formed Combahee River Collective, a Black feminist lesbian organization created in Boston, drafts the Combahee River Collective Statement a key document in the history of contemporary Black feminism and the development of the concepts of identity and intersectionality as used among political organizers and social theorists.

=== 1976 ===
- Glenn Burke becomes the first (and only) openly gay Major League Baseball (MLB) player, coming out as gay to teammates and team owners during his professional career and later acknowledging it in public.

=== 1978 ===
- Sylvester releases his well-received disco album Step II.
- National Coalition of Black Lesbians and Gays (NCBLG) founded by A. Billy S. Jones, Darlene Garner, Delores P. Berry, and Gilberto Gerald (among other activists) in Columbia, Maryland.

=== 1979 ===
- The first National Third World Lesbian and Gay Conference takes place in Washington D.C. It brought together LGBT people of color from the U.S., Mexico, Canada, and the Caribbean.
- The Lambda Student Alliance forms at Howard University in Washington, D.C., the first openly Black LGBT organization on a college campus.
- August 1 – Blacklight, the first Black gay publication in the Washington, D.C. area, begins publication under founding editor Sidney Brinkley.
- October 14 – Audre Lorde speaks at the National March on Washington for Lesbian and Gay Rights.

== 1980s ==
=== 1980 ===
- October 17 to 19 – The First Black Lesbian Conference is held in San Francisco, with nearly 200 women in attendance.

=== 1983 ===
- In 1983, after a battle over LGB participation in the 20th anniversary March on Washington, a group of African American leaders endorsed a national gay rights bill alongside Coretta Scott King and put Audre Lorde from the National Coalition of Black Lesbians and Gays as speaker on the agenda.

=== 1984 ===
- Rev. Jesse Jackson included LGB people as part of his Rainbow/PUSH.

=== 1985 ===
- Once the only gay bar in Brixton, South London and cornerstone of the 1970s Black LGBT community, bisexual Jamaican immigrant Pearl Alcock's shebeen closes.

=== 1987 ===
- The Black Gay and Lesbian Leadership Forum was founded in 1987 in Los Angeles, California by Phill Wilson and Ruth Waters.

=== 1988 ===
- The first Black Pride event in the United States, called "At the Beach LA," occurs in Los Angeles, California, U.S.
- 4 March – South Africa passes the Immorality Amendment Act, 1988 imposes an age of consent of 19 for lesbian sex, which had previously been unregulated by the law. This was higher than the age of 16 applying to heterosexual sex.

=== 1989 ===
- Kimberlé Crenshaw creates the term "intersectionality," to show how different aspects of one's identity, including race, sexuality, gender, etc., combine to affect their life.
- Keith St. John was elected to the Albany Common Council, becoming the first openly gay Black elected official in the U.S.

== 1990s ==
=== 1990 ===
- 13 October – The first pride parade in South Africa was held in Johannesburg.
- Sherry Harris was elected to the City Council in Seattle, Washington, making her the first openly lesbian African-American elected official.
- Gays and Lesbians of Zimbabwe (GALZ) is founded.

=== 1991 ===
- November 7 – NBA player Magic Johnson, who is straight, holds a press conference to reveal that he is HIV-positive and retiring from the NBA. His announcement and subsequent activism helps to dispel public perceptions of HIV/AIDS as a "gay" or "drug addict" disease.
- The very first annual D.C. Black Pride event was held in Washington, D.C., inspiring other Black Pride celebrations around the country and around the world.
- Burkina Faso's 1991 constitution bans same-sex marriage, although same-sex relationships are not criminalized.

=== 1993 ===
- Dr. William F. Gibson, national Chairman of the Board of NAACP, endorsed the March on Washington for Lesbian, Gay and Bi Equal Rights and Liberation and the end of the ban on LGB service in the United States military.
- Althea Garrison becomes the first transgender or transsexual person to be elected to a state legislature in the United States.
- Phill Wilson of the Black Gay and Lesbian Leadership Forum speaks at the 30th anniversary of the March on Washington on behalf of Black gay and lesbian people.

=== 1994 ===
- Anti-discrimination legislation: South Africa (sexual orientation, interim constitution)
- Bermuda decriminalizes homosexuality.
- National Coalition for Gay and Lesbian Equality is founded in South Africa.
- Deborah Batts became the first Black, openly lesbian federal judge in U.S. history, nominated by President Bill Clinton and later confirmed to the U.S. District Court for the Southern District of New York.

=== 1995 ===
- The Black Gay and Lesbian Leadership Forum organizes an historic Black gay contingent in the Million Man March.

=== 1996 ===
- Burkina Faso equalizes age of consent.

=== 1997 ===
- Sexual orientation-inclusive Anti-discrimination is added to the constitution of South Africa.

=== 1998 ===
- LGB servicemembers are allowed to serve in the South African National Defence Force.
- 8 May – In the case of National Coalition for Gay and Lesbian Equality v Minister of Justice, a judge of the Witwatersrand Local Division of the High Court of South Africa declares the criminalisation of sodomy and "unnatural sexual acts", and section 20A of the Sexual Offences Act, to be unconstitutional for violating the anti-discrimination clause of the Constitution.
- 9 October – The Constitutional Court of South Africa unanimously confirms the judgment of the High Court in the National Coalition case.
- 30 November – South African gay rights and anti-apartheid activist Simon Nkoli dies of AIDS.
- J-FLAG, a Jamaican LGBT rights organization, is formed.
- Coretta Scott King announces her support for LGBT equality, saying "Homophobia is like racism and anti-Semitism and other forms of bigotry in that it seeks to dehumanize a large group of people, to deny their humanity, their dignity and personhood. This sets the stage for further repression and violence that spread all too easily to victimize the next minority group."

=== 1999 ===
- 12 February – In the case of National Coalition for Gay and Lesbian Equality v Minister of Home Affairs, three judges of the Cape Provincial Division of the High Court rule that it is unconstitutional for the government to provide immigration benefits to the foreign spouses of South Africans but not to the foreign same-sex partners of South Africans. The declaration of invalidity is suspended for one year to allow Parliament to correct the law.
- May – Black AIDS Institute is founded by Phill Wilson.
- 2 December – The Constitutional Court unanimously confirms the judgment of the High Court in the second National Coalition case, but removes the suspension of the order and instead "reads in" words to the law to immediately extend immigration benefits to same-sex partners.

== 2000s ==
=== 2000 ===
- South Africa passes PEPUDA, which prohibits discrimination, hate speech and harassment on numerous bases, including sexual orientation.

=== 2001 ===
- 25 September – In the case of Satchwell v President of the Republic of South Africa, a judge of the Transvaal Provincial Division of the High Court rules that financial benefits provided to the spouses of judges must also be provided to the same-sex life partners of judges.
- 28 September – In the case of Du Toit v Minister of Welfare and Population Development, a judge of the Transvaal Provincial Division rules that same-sex partners must be allowed to jointly adopt children and to adopt each other's children, a right which was previously limited to married spouses.

=== 2003 ===
- South Africa passes Alteration of Sex Description and Sex Status Act, 2003 which allows a person to change, under certain conditions, their sex recorded in the population registry.
- Coalition of African Lesbians is organized.
- August 23 – Mandy Carter, founder & former Executive Director of Southerners On New Ground, speaks at 40th Anniversary of the 1963 March on Washington. She is one of two LGBT activists to speak at the march and the only Black LGBT person to do so.
- December 8 – National Black Justice Coalition (NBJC) is founded by Mandy Carter, Keith Boykin and other activists.
- June 26 – African-American man Tyron Garner is a joint plaintiff with John Geddes Lawrence Jr. in Lawrence v. Texas, a landmark 5–4 decision by the United States Supreme Court which strikes down all remaining sodomy laws and makes same-sex sexual activity legal in every U.S. state and territory.

=== 2004 ===
- Decriminalisation of homosexuality: Cape Verde
- In an interview on New Dawn with Funmi, LGBT activist Bisi Alimi discloses his homosexuality, becoming the first person to voluntarily out themselves on Nigerian television.
- Gordon Fox comes out as first openly gay African-American member of a state legislature, as well as the first openly gay member of the Rhode Island House of Representatives.
- NBJC is extended an invitation by NAACP Chairman Julian Bond to attend the 2004 NAACP National Convention in Philadelphia, Pennsylvania.
- Sexual Minorities Uganda, an umbrella advocacy organization for LGBT Ugandans, is founded.
- Cape Verde amends their penal code and became the second African country to legalize same-sex sexual acts. At the time of decriminalization, the legal age of consent was 16 years old, the same age for consensual heterosexual acts.

=== 2005 ===
- 11 March – The Chief Justice instructs that the Equality Project case will be heard by the Constitutional Court simultaneously with the Fourie case.
- October 27 – WNBA player Sheryl Swoopes comes out as lesbian.
- 1 December – The Constitutional Court delivers its judgment in the Fourie and Equality Project cases (now known as Minister of Home Affairs v Fourie). The court rules that the common-law definition of marriage and the Marriage Act are unconstitutional because they do not allow same-sex couples to marry. The court suspends its order for one year to allow Parliament to rectify the discrimination.

=== 2006 ===
- January 1 – Texas transgender activist Monica Roberts launches her blog TransGriot, which focuses on transgender women of color.

=== 2008 ===
- California Proposition 8 passes a ban on same-sex marriages. The fallout from the ban includes criticism of African-American voters for voting for the ban.
- Discrimination based on sexual orientation in the workplace is banned in Cape Verde by articles 45(2) and 406(3) of the Labour Code.

=== 2009 ===
- In October 2009, LGBT activist Amy Andre was appointed as executive director of the San Francisco Pride Celebration Committee, making her San Francisco Pride's first openly bisexual woman of color executive director.
- Simone Bell becomes the first African-American lesbian to serve in a U.S. state legislature (Georgia House of Representatives).
- Matthew Shepard and James Byrd Jr. Hate Crimes Prevention Act, which adds gender, sexual orientation, gender identity and disability to existing hate crime laws, is signed into law by President Barack Obama.

== 2010s ==
=== 2010 ===
- February 11 – Gordon Fox is elected as the first openly gay African-American man to hold the speakership of a U.S. state legislature.
- NBJC holds first "Out On The Hill" (OOTH) Conference.
- 2 November – A lawsuit by four Ugandan activists, including David Kato, Kasha Nabagesera, Nabirye Mariam and Pepe Julian Onziema, against the Ugandan tabloid newspaper Rolling Stone is granted by the High Court to force the paper to cease distribution of an article inciting violence against them and many others.

=== 2011 ===
- A resolution submitted by South Africa requesting a study on discrimination and sexual orientation (A/HRC/17/L.9/Rev.1) passed, 23 to 19 with 3 abstentions, in the UN Human Rights Council on 17 June 2011. This is the first time that any United Nations body approved a resolution affirming the rights of LGBT people.
- Rashad Taylor comes out as the first openly gay male to serve in the Georgia General Assembly and the second openly gay African American male state legislator in the United States.
- Marcus Brandon becomes first gay African-American male state legislator to be elected to office (North Carolina General Assembly).
- The Bahamas decriminalizes homosexuality.
- June 5 – Minneapolis woman CeCe McDonald is arrested for the stabbing death of a man in purported self-defense after McDonald and her friends were assaulted outside a bar. Her case becomes a cause celebre for LGBT and African American civil rights activists.
- September 20 – President Barack Obama signs repeal of "Don't Ask, Don't Tell".

=== 2012 ===
- Decriminalization of homosexuality: Lesotho (male homosexuality; female homosexuality is already legal), São Tomé and Príncipe
- Barack Obama, the first U.S. president of African descent, becomes the first sitting president to endorse same-sex marriage as a civil right.
- The NAACP passed a resolution in support of same-sex marriage.
- In June 2012, Diana King becomes first Jamaican reggae singer to come out as a lesbian.
- Kylar Broadus, a board member of the National Black Justice Coalition and founder of the Trans People of Color Coalition (TPOCC), becomes the first openly transgender person to testify before the U.S. Senate. He testifies in support of Employment Non-Discrimination Act (ENDA).
- African-American singer Frank Ocean comes out as bisexual.

=== 2013 ===
- April 29 – Jason Collins becomes the first active male professional athlete in a major North American team sport to publicly come out as gay.
- Fallon Fox comes out as transgender, thus becoming the first openly transgender athlete in mixed martial arts history.
- Darren Young (real name: Fred Rosser) becomes the first active professional wrestler to come out as gay.
- The Directors Guild Of America electes Paris Barclay as its first black and first openly gay president.
- Brittney Griner, WNBA Draft Pick, comes out as lesbian.
- NBJC Executive Director & CEO, Sharon Lettman-Hicks speaks at 50th Anniversary of the 1963 March On Washington.
- Bayard Rustin posthumously receives Presidential Medal of Freedom.
- Robin Roberts, ABC's Good Morning America news anchor, comes out as lesbian.

=== 2014 ===
- February 9 – NFL prospect Michael Sam, defensive lineman for the University of Missouri and the 2013 SEC Defensive Player of the Year, comes out as gay.
- 24 February – The Uganda Anti-Homosexuality Act, 2014 is signed into law by President Yoweri Museveni. The law is immediately appealed to the Constitutional Court.
- 29 April – The National Intervention Strategy for the LGBTI Sector of South Africa developed by the NTT is launched by then Minister of Justice Jeff Radebe.
- 25 May – Lynne Brown becomes the first openly gay person to be appointed to a cabinet post in any African government.
- Zakhele Mbhele became the first openly gay person to serve in South Africa's parliament, which also makes him the first openly gay black member of parliament in any African nation.
- May – Michael Sam is drafted to the St. Louis Rams, becoming the first openly gay player to be drafted.
- June 17 – Darrin P. Gayles becomes the first openly gay African-American man to be confirmed as a United States federal judge.
- June 25 – Tona Brown became the first African-American openly transgender woman to perform at Carnegie Hall.
- July 13 – Laverne Cox becomes the first transgender actress to be nominated for an Emmy Award, for her role in Orange Is the New Black.
- 1 August – The Uganda Anti-Homosexuality Act, 2014 is annulled by the Constitutional Court of Uganda on procedural grounds.
- Laverne Cox becomes the first transgender person to cover TIME magazine.
- Janet Mock's memoir Redefining Realness is published, reaching the New York Times Best Sellers List, ranking #19 for Hardcover Nonfiction.
- Derrick Gordon, shooting guard for the University of Massachusetts, becomes the first openly gay men's basketball player in NCAA Division I history.

=== 2015 ===
- June 29 – Decriminalisation of homosexuality: Mozambique
- Tracey Norman and Geena Rocero became the first two openly transgender models to appear on the cover of an edition of Harper's Bazaar.
- Coalition of African Lesbians is accepted as an observer of the African Commission on Human and Peoples' Rights, which previously rejected the organization's application
- August – J-FLAG holds Jamaica's first pride-themed events supporting Jamaica's LGBT community.

=== 2016 ===
- 7 June – Decriminalisation of homosexuality: Seychelles
- 10 August – Decriminalisation of homosexuality: Belize
- March – the Gaborone City Council unanimously approves a motion calling for the repeal of Botswana's criminalisation of same-sex sexual acts.
- November – Barbados Pride is held for the first time in Bridgetown

=== 2017 ===
- Moonlight, a drama film directed by Barry Jenkins, becomes the first film with an all-black cast and first LGBT-centered film to win the Academy Award for Best Picture.
- In August 2017, the first West Africa LGBT-Inclusive religious gathering occurred. Over 30 participants indigenous to ten West African countries, including Benin, Nigeria, Ghana, Sierra Leone, Liberia, The Gambia, Burkina Faso, Côte d'Ivoire, Mali, and Togo participated in an interfaith diversity event hosted by Interfaith Diversity Network of West Africa with the theme of "Building Bridges, Sharing Stories, Creating Hope"
- September – the Botswana High Court rules that the refusal of the Registrar of National Registration to change a transgender man's gender marker was "unreasonable and violated his constitutional rights to dignity, privacy, freedom of expression, equal protection of the law, freedom from discrimination and freedom from inhumane and degrading treatment".
- December – Tshepo Ricki Kgositau, 30, wins Botswana court case to legally recognise her gender change as a trans woman and receive a new identity card marking her as female before 2018.

=== 2018 ===
- 12 April – Decriminalisation of homosexuality: Trinidad and Tobago
- 18 January – Court case is filed by the National Gay and Lesbian Human Rights Commission of Kenya to challenge the constitutionality of Kenya's sodomy law as contained in sections 162, 163 and 165 of the Penal Code.
- 21 September – The High Court of Kenya rules that the film Rafiki be allowed to screen in Kenyan theaters for one week in order to be eligible as Kenya's entry for the Academy Award for Best Foreign Language Film, temporarily lifting the ban imposed on it by the Kenya Film Classification Board for same-sex content. This results in Rafiki becoming one of the highest-grossing films ever screened in Kenyan theaters.
- Erica Malunguinho (of São Paulo) and Robeyoncé Lima (of Pernambuco), both of Afro-Brazilian descent, become the first transgender people elected to a Brazilian state legislature.

=== 2019 ===
- 23 January – Decriminalisation of homosexuality: Angola
- 11 June – Decriminalisation of homosexuality: Botswana
- Nigeria's first lesbian-focused documentary film premiered; it is called Under the Rainbow, and largely focuses on the life of Pamela Adie, an out Nigerian lesbian.
- David Miranda becomes the first Black gay member of the Chamber of Deputies of Brazil.

== 2020s ==
=== 2020 ===
- Decriminalisation of homosexuality: Gabon
- Sudan abolished the death penalty and flogging for homosexuality.
- In Angola, a new criminal code has gone into effect after the parliament passed it in January 2019 and President João Lourenço signed it into law in November 2020. The new penal code no longer criminalizes homosexuality and it contains full anti-discrimination protections on the basis of sexuality and gender identity.
- Mondaire Jones and Ritchie Torres become the first LGBT people of African descent elected to the U.S. House of Representatives.
- Martin Jenkins was sworn in as the first openly gay Justice of the California Supreme Court.
- Stormie Forte became the first African American woman and openly LGBTQ woman to serve on the Raleigh City Council.
- Mauree Turner became the first non-binary state legislator elected in the United States.

=== 2021 ===
- Vivi Reis becomes the first Black LGBT woman member of the Chamber of Deputies of Brazil.

=== 2022 ===
- 5 July – Decriminalisation of homosexuality: Antigua & Barbuda
- 29 August – Decriminalisation of homosexuality: Saint Kitts and Nevis
- 13 December – Decriminalisation of homosexuality: Barbados
- Karine Jean-Pierre, of Afro-Haitian descent, becomes the first LGBT White House Press Secretary.
- L Morgan Lee became the first openly transgender person nominated for a Tony Award in an acting category; she was nominated for Best Performance by a Featured Actress in a Musical for playing Thought 1 in A Strange Loop.
- Ariana DeBose became the first queer woman of color and the first Afro-Latina to win an Oscar for acting, which she won for her role as Anita in the 2021 remake of West Side Story directed by Stephen Spielberg.
- Ellia Green became the first Olympian to come out as a trans man.
- Erika Hilton becomes one of the first two transgender members of the Chamber of Deputies of Brazil.
- Erick Russell becomes the first gay Black person elected to statewide executive office in Connecticut and the United States.
- Davante Lewis becomes the first gay or LGBT person elected to state office in Louisiana, United States.

=== 2023 ===
- The Parliament of Uganda passes a more stringent law against homosexuality, which includes making "aggravated homosexuality" a capital offense. Ugandan President Yoweri Museveni sends the bill back to parliament demanding inclusion of mandated conversion therapy into the bill.
- The Judiciary of Jamaica rules against a constitutional challenge to Jamaica's 1861 buggery law, stating that a "savings clause" in the constitution prevents legal challenges to colonial laws in force at the time of Jamaica's independence in 1962 and makes its repeal a question solely for Parliament.
- The Supreme Court of Namibia rules that the same-sex marriages made in countries where it is legal must be recognized as equal to heterosexual marriages by the government, although same-sex marriage remain illegal in Namibia.

=== 2024 ===
- South African president Cyril Ramaphosa signs the Prevention and Combating of Hate Crimes and Hate Speech Act, 2023.
- The Parliament of Seychelles passes a hate crime law that includes protections for LGBTI people and people living with HIV.
- The Parliament of Lesotho passes an updated Labour Act that prohibits employment discrimination against LGBT people and people living with HIV, and requires equal pay for equal work for men and women.
- The military juntas in Burkina Faso and Mali propose new penal codes which criminalize homosexuality.
- The Supreme Court of Ghana upholds a 1960 sodomy law.
- Gabon approves a new constitution which bans same-sex marriage.
- The Eastern Caribbean Supreme Court rules to uphold Saint Vincent and the Grenadines' sodomy law.
- The Parliament of Barbados passes an updated Sexual Offences Act which removes references to sodomy and ensures that rape laws are gender neutral.
- The Supreme Court of the Netherlands strikes down laws in Aruba and Curaçao prohibiting performance of same-sex marriage.

=== 2025 ===
- Criminalisation of homosexuality: Burkina Faso, Mali, Trinidad and Tobago
- Decriminalization of homosexuality: Saint Lucia
- Supreme Court of Kenya directs the government to protect transgender peoples’ rights, including recognition of their chosen gender and dignified treatment in government custody.

== See also ==
- Recognition of same-sex unions in Africa
- LGBT rights in Africa
- Human rights in Africa
- Coalition of African Lesbians
- LGBT rights by country or territory
