= LGBTQ rights in South Africa =

- South Africa
- Legal status: Male legal since 1998, female never illegal; age of consent equalised in 2007
- Gender identity: Change of legal gender permitted since 2003
- Military: Allowed to serve
- Discrimination protections: Constitutional and statutory protections (see below)

Family rights
- Recognition of relationships: Same-sex marriage since 2006
- Adoption: Full adoption rights since 2002

Lesbian, gay, bisexual, transgender, and queer (LGBTQ) people in South Africa have the same legal rights as non-LGBTQ people, the only country in Africa where this is the case. South Africa has a complex and diverse history regarding the human rights of LGBTQ people. Rights have strengthened over the years, as has acceptance of the community.

Contributing factors include traditional South African morals amongst some citizens, colonialism, the lingering effects of apartheid, the human rights movement that contributed to its abolition, a strong legal system of protections for marginalised communities, and a generally progressive political landscape and younger generation.

The country hosts numerous LGBTQ+ events throughout the year, and major cities celebrate Pride. South Africa is generally considered the safest and most welcoming country in Africa for the LGBTQ+ community, and as of 2025, the country ranks highly on a global scale for LGBTQ+ rights, protections, and travel.

South Africa's post-apartheid Constitution was the first in the world to outlaw discrimination based on sexual orientation, and in 2006, South Africa became the fifth country in the world and the first and only nation in Africa to legalise same-sex marriage. Same-sex couples can also adopt children jointly, and also arrange IVF and surrogacy treatments. LGBTQ people have constitutional and statutory protections from discrimination in employment and society, the provision of goods and services and many other areas.

== LGBT history in South Africa ==
Homosexuality and same-sex relations have been documented among various modern-day South African groups. In the 18th century, the Khoikhoi people recognised the terms koetsire, which refers to a man who is sexually receptive to another man, and soregus, which refers to same-sex masturbation usually among friends. Anal intercourse and sexual relations between women also occurred, though more rarely. The Khoi youth Klaas Blank was the first to be executed for sodomy in the Dutch Cape Colony in 1735 after having sexual relations with a man.

The Bantu peoples, most notably the Zulu, Basotho, Mpondo and Tsonga people, had a tradition of young men (inkotshane in Zulu, boukonchana in Sesotho, tinkonkana in Mpondo, and nkhonsthana in Tsonga, also known as "boy-wives" in English) who typically dressed as women (even wearing fake breasts), performed chores associated with women, such as cooking and fetching water and firewood, and had intercrural sex with their older husbands (numa in Ndebele and Sesotho, and nima in Mpondo and Tsonga).

In addition, they were not allowed to grow beards, and sometimes they were not allowed to ejaculate. Upon reaching manhood, the relationship would be dissolved, and the boy-wife could take an inkotshane of his own if he so desired. These relationships, also known as "mine marriages" as they were common among miners, continued well into the 1950s. They are usually discussed as homosexual relationships, though sometimes the boy-wives are discussed in the context of transgender experiences.

Other Bantu peoples, including the Tswana people, and the Ndebele people, had traditions of acceptance or indifference towards same-sex sexual acts. In these societies, homosexuality was not viewed as an antithesis to heterosexuality. There was widespread liberty to engage in sexual activity with both men and women.

In IsiNgqumo, the term skesana refers to effeminate gay men who have sexual relations with men, or transgender women, although the two are not the same at all. The term injonga refers to masculine gay men.

Sexual intercourse between men was historically prohibited in South Africa as the common law crime of "sodomy" and "unnatural sexual offence", inherited from the Roman-Dutch law. A 1969 amendment to the Immorality Act prohibited men from engaging in any erotic conduct when there were more than two people present. In the 1970s and the 1980s, LGBT activism was among the many human rights movements in the nation, with some groups only dealing with LGBT rights and others advocating for a broader human rights campaign.

In 1994, male same-sex conduct was legalised, female same-sex conduct never having been illegal (as with other former British colonies). At the time of legalisation, the age of consent was set at 19 for all same-sex sexual conduct, regardless of gender. In May 1996, South Africa became the first jurisdiction in the world to provide constitutional protection to LGBTQ people, via section 9(3) of the South African Constitution, which disallows discrimination on race, gender, sexual orientation and other grounds. Since 16 December 2007, all discriminatory provisions have been formally repealed. This included introducing an equalised age of consent at 16 regardless of sexual orientation, and all sexual offences defined in gender-neutral terms.

=== Apartheid era ===
Under South Africa's ruling National Party from 1948 to 1994, homosexuality was a crime punishable by up to seven years in prison; this law was used to harass and outlaw South African gay community events and political activists. In January 1966, the Forest Town raid on a large party in Forest Town, Gauteng led to further restrictions on gay and lesbian South Africans.

Despite state opposition, several South African gay rights organisations formed in the late 1970s. However, until the late 1980s gay organisations were often divided along racial lines and the larger political question of apartheid. The Gay Association of South Africa (GASA), based in the Hillbrow district in central Johannesburg, was a predominantly white organisation that initially avoided taking an official position on apartheid, while the Rand Gay Organisation was multi-racial and founded in opposition to apartheid. Lesbians in Love and Compromising Situations (LILACS) was founded in 1983 as the first South African lesbian-only society, by a group including Julia Nicol and Sheila Lapinsky. LILACS disbanded in 1985 due to disagreement among members as to whether the group should be involved in political campaigns rather than focus on social activities.

Hubert du Plessis, one of the most prominent South African composers of the 20th century, was proudly and openly gay yet also a staunch supporter of the National Party and composed many nationalist works. He was outspoken about his sexuality, however, and appeared before Parliament in the late 1960s to protest the tightening of sodomy laws.

In the country's 1987 general election, GASA and the gay magazine Exit endorsed the National Party candidate for Hillbrow, Leon de Beer. The campaign brought to a head the tensions between LGBT activists who overtly opposed apartheid and those that did not. De Beer was the National Party's first candidate to address gay rights, and advertised for his campaign in Exit. It was the general opinion of the gay community of Hillbrow that their vote was the deciding factor in de Beer's ultimate victory.

From the 1960s to the late 1980s, the South African Defence Force forced white gay and lesbian soldiers to undergo various medical "cures" for their sexual orientation, including sex reassignment surgery. The treatment of gay and lesbian soldiers in the South African military was explored in a 2003 documentary film, titled Property of the State.

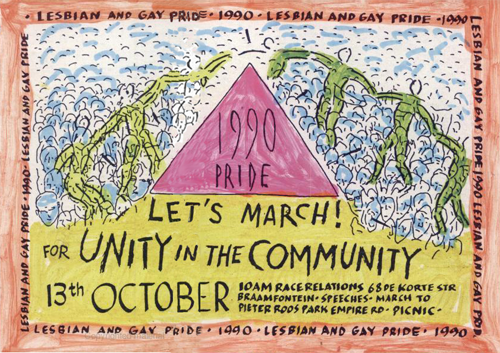
Poster for the first ever Joburg Pride event, 1990

South Africa's first ever Lesbian and Gay Pride march was held on 13 October 1990 in Johannesburg, organized by the Gay and Lesbian Organization of Witwatersrand. It was attended by around 800 people, and speakers included Beverley Ditsie, Simon Nkoli and Edwin Cameron.

Organisations such as the Organisation of Lesbian and Gay Activists (OLGA) worked with the African National Congress to include protections for LGBT people in the new Constitution of South Africa.

=== Post-apartheid era ===
Gay flag of South Africa

In 1993, the African National Congress, in the Bill of Rights, (Note: Zulu: Umqulu Wamalungelo; Xhosa: Umqulu Wamalungelo; Afrikaans: Handves van regte; Northern Sotho: Molao wa Ditokelo; Tswana: Molaotlhomo wa Ditshwanelo; Sotho: Bili ya Ditokelo; Tsonga: Nawumbisi wa Timfanelo; Swazi: LuCwebu LwemaLungelo ELuntfu; Venda: Mulayotibe wa Pfanelo; Southern Ndebele: UmTlolo WamaLungelo WobuNtu) endorsed the legal recognition of same-sex marriages, and the interim Constitution prohibited discrimination on the basis of sexual orientation. These provisions were kept in the new Constitution, approved in 1996, due to the lobbying efforts of LGBT South Africans. As a result, South Africa became the first nation in the world to explicitly prohibit discrimination based on sexual orientation in its constitution. Two years later, the Constitutional Court of South Africa ruled in a landmark case that the law prohibiting homosexual conduct between consenting adults in private violated the Constitution.

In 1994, during his inauguration speech as president, Nelson Mandela stated the following:

In 1980s the African National Congress was still setting the pace, being the first major political formation in South Africa to commit itself firmly to a Bill of Rights, which we published in November 1990. These milestones give concrete expression to what South Africa can become. They speak of a constitutional, democratic, political order in which, regardless of colour, gender, religion, political opinion or sexual orientation, the law will provide for the equal protection of all citizens.

The gay flag of South Africa, designed by Eugene Brockman, is a hybrid of the LGBT rainbow flag and the South African national flag launched in 1994 after the end of the apartheid era. Brockman said "I truly believe we (the LGBT community) put the dazzle into our rainbow nation and this flag is a symbol of just that". The stated purposes of the flag include celebrating legal same-sex marriage in South Africa and addressing issues such as discrimination, homophobia, corrective rape and hate crimes. The flag is a gay pride symbol that aims to reflect the freedom and diversity of the South African nation and build pride in being an LGBT South African.

In 1998, Parliament passed the Employment Equity Act. The law protects South Africans from labour discrimination on the basis of sexual orientation, among other categories. In 2000, similar protections were extended to public accommodations and services, with the commencement of the Promotion of Equality and Prevention of Unfair Discrimination Act.

In December 2005, the Constitutional Court of South Africa ruled that it was unconstitutional to prevent people of the same gender from marrying when it was permitted to people of the opposite gender, and gave the South African Parliament one year to pass legislation which would allow same-sex unions. In November 2006, the National Assembly voted 229–41 for a bill allowing same-sex civil marriage, as well as civil partnerships for unmarried opposite-sex and same-sex couples. However, civil servants and clergy can refuse to solemnise same-sex unions.

Not all ANC members supported the new law. Former South African President Jacob Zuma was among its most outspoken opponents, claiming in 2006 that "when I was growing up, an ungqingili (Zulu term describing a homosexual) would not have stood in front of me. I would knock him out." Unlike Zuma, his successor, President Cyril Ramaphosa, is considered an LGBT-friendly politician, and has a positive record regarding LGBT people and their rights.

In 2017, Ramaphosa said in a recorded videoclip (to celebrate LGBT History Month), "It is a sad truth that in our nation the LGBTI community are amongst the most vulnerable and marginalised. They suffer discrimination, violence and abuse. We must as a nation do better than what we are now. We are all born the way we are. We need to support, embrace and respect each other. When we treat each other with dignity, we are all more dignified. When we treat each other with respect, we are all more respected. It is upon us all to contribute to the creation of a more just, equal and safe society. Every South African must hold themselves, our communities, our institutions and our government accountable for upholding our laws and for protecting the rights of all in South Africa."

In 2019, Ramaphosa included lesbian and gay people in his presidential inauguration speech, saying,

Let us end the dominion that men claim over women, the denial of opportunity, the abuse and the violence, the neglect, and the disregard of each person’s equal rights. Let us build a society that protects and values those who are vulnerable and who for too long have been rendered marginal. A society where disability is no impediment, where there is tolerance, and where no person is judged on their sexual orientation, where no person suffers prejudice because of the colour of their skin, the language of their birth or their country of origin.

== South Africa's global rankings ==
South Africa ranks highly for LGBTQ+ protections, rights, and travel, on global indexes. In 2025, the country was among the world's best in the Spartacus Gay Travel Index, as well as Equaldex's LGBT Equality Index.

South Africa is one of just a few countries in the world to be a member of the United Nations LGBTI Core Group.

Cape Town, one of South Africa's capitals, is considered one of the world's friendliest cities towards the LGBTQ+ community.

== Legality of same-sex sexual activity ==
On 4 August 1997, in the case of S v Kampher, the Cape Provincial Division of the High Court ruled that the common-law crime of sodomy was incompatible with the constitutional rights to equality and privacy, and that it had ceased to exist as an offence when the Interim Constitution came into force on 27 April 1994. Strictly speaking, this judgment only applied to the crime of sodomy and not to the other laws criminalising sex between men, and it was also only binding precedent within the area of jurisdiction of the Cape court.

On 8 May 1998, in the case of National Coalition for Gay and Lesbian Equality v Minister of Justice, the Witwatersrand Local Division of the High Court ruled that the common-law crimes of sodomy and "commission of an unnatural sexual act", as well as Section 20A of the Sexual Offences Act, were unconstitutional. The Constitutional Court confirmed this judgment on 9 October of the same year. The ruling applied retroactively to acts committed since the adoption of the Interim Constitution on 27 April 1994.

While the ruling struck down the criminalisation of sex between men, it left untouched a separate provision contained in the Sexual Offences Act, which made it an offence for both men and women to engage in homosexual acts with someone aged under 19, effectively setting the age of consent at 19 for homosexual acts (compared to 16 for heterosexual acts).

This was rectified in 2007 by the Criminal Law (Sexual Offences and Related Matters) Amendment Act, which codified the law on sex offences in gender and orientation neutral terms and set 16 as the uniform age of consent. In 2008, even though the new law had come into effect, the former inequality was declared to be unconstitutional in the case of Geldenhuys v National Director of Public Prosecutions, with the ruling again applying retroactively from 27 April 1994.

== Recognition of same-sex relationships ==
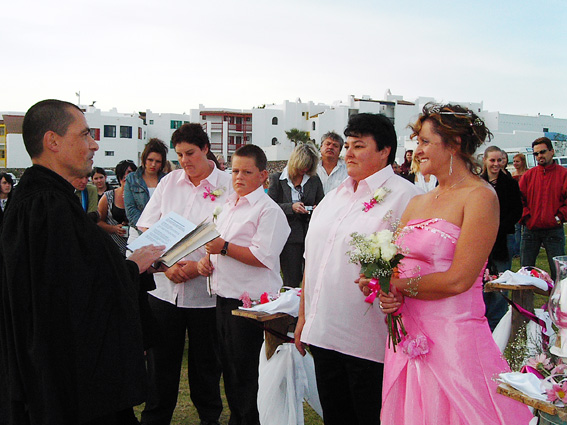
Same-sex wedding in Langebaan, 2007

On 1 December 2005, in the case of Minister of Home Affairs v Fourie, the Constitutional Court ruled that it was unconstitutional for the state to deny same-sex couples the ability to marry, and gave Parliament one year in which to rectify the situation. On 30 November 2006, the Civil Union Act came into force; despite its title it does provide for same-sex marriages. This made South Africa among the first countries in the world to legalise same-sex marriage.

Indeed, the act allows both same-sex and opposite-sex couples to contract unions, and allows a couple to choose to call their union either a marriage or a civil partnership. Whichever name is chosen, the legal consequences are the same as those under the Marriage Act (which allows only for opposite-sex marriages).

Prior to the introduction of same-sex marriage, court decisions and statutes had recognised permanent same-sex partnerships for various specific purposes, but there was no system of domestic partnership registration.

The rights recognised or extended by the courts include the duty of support between partners, immigration benefits, employment and pension benefits, joint adoption, parental rights to children conceived through artificial insemination, a claim for loss of support when a partner is negligently killed, and intestate inheritance. Rights extended by statute include protections against domestic violence and the right to family responsibility leave. South Africa remains the only African country where same-sex marriage is legally recognised.

== Adoption and parenting ==
A number of High Court judgments have determined that the sexual orientation of a parent is not a relevant issue in decisions on child custody. In 2002, the Constitutional Court's ruling in Du Toit v Minister of Welfare and Population Development gave same-sex partners the same adoption rights as married spouses, allowing couples to adopt children jointly and allowing one partner to adopt the other's children. The adoption law has since been replaced by the Children's Act, 2005, which allows adoption by spouses and by "partners in a permanent domestic life-partnership" regardless of orientation.

In 1997, artificial insemination, which was previously limited to married women, was made legal for single women including lesbians. In the 2003 case of J v Director General, Department of Home Affairs, the Constitutional Court ruled that a child born by artificial insemination to a lesbian couple was to be regarded as legitimate, and that the partner who was not the biological parent was entitled to be regarded as a natural parent and to be recorded on the child's birth certificate.

In November 2017, the National Assembly passed the Labour Laws Amendment Act 10 of 2018, introduced as a private member's bill by African Christian Democratic Party MP Cheryllyn Dudley. It was signed into law by President Cyril Ramaphosa in November 2018. The law allows same-sex couples, as well as adoptive and surrogate parents, to take parental leave, and fathers will get at least 10 days paternity leave when a child is born or when an adoption order is granted. It also enables the adoptive parents of a child of under two years old to take an adoption leave of two months and two weeks consecutively. If there are two adoptive parents‚ one of them is entitled to adoption leave and the other is entitled to parental leave of 10 days. The same provision is made for commissioning parents in a surrogate motherhood agreement. The law went into effect on 1 January 2019.

== Discrimination protections ==
The protection of LGBT rights in South Africa is based on section 9 of the Constitution, which forbids discrimination on the basis of sex, gender or sexual orientation, and applies to government and private parties. The Constitutional Court has stated that the section must also be interpreted as prohibiting discrimination against transgender people. These constitutional protections have been reinforced by the jurisprudence of the Constitutional Court and various statutes enacted by Parliament.

In 2012, the Congress of Traditional Leaders of South Africa (Contralesa) filed a draft document calling for the removal of LGBT rights from the Constitution of South Africa. The group submitted a proposal to the Constitutional Review Committee of the National Assembly to amend section 9 of the Constitution. The Committee at the time was chaired by MP Sango Patekile Holomisa, who is also president of Contralesa. The parliamentary caucus of the ruling African National Congress rejected the proposal.

The Constitution prohibits all unfair discrimination on the basis of sex, gender or sexual orientation, whether committed by the government or by a private party. In 2000, Parliament enacted the Promotion of Equality and Prevention of Unfair Discrimination Act (PEPUDA), which restates the constitutional prohibition and establishes special Equality Courts to address discrimination by private parties. The Employment Equity Act, 1998 and the Rental Housing Act, 1999 specifically forbid discrimination in employment and housing, respectively.

The PEPUDA also prohibits hate speech and harassment based on any of the prohibited grounds of discrimination. South Africa does not have any statutory law requiring increased penalties for hate crimes, but hatred motivated by homophobia has been treated by courts as an aggravating factor in sentencing.

=== Prevention and Combating of Hate Crimes and Hate Speech Bill ===
Prevention and Combating of Hate Crimes and Hate Speech Bill, was passed by the National Assembly in March 2023 and by the National Council in November 2023, and signed into law by President Ramaphosa in May 2024.

Public consultation on the bill was held between October and December 2016. Following calls that the bill was too vague and threatened freedom of speech, provisions dealing with hate speech were changed, and now read: "Any person who intentionally publishes, propagates or advocates anything or communicates to one or more persons in a manner that could reasonably be construed to demonstrate a clear intention to— (i) be harmful or to incite harm; or (ii) promote or propagate hatred, based on one or more of the following grounds: age, albinism, birth, colour, culture, disability, ethnic or social origin, gender or gender identity, HIV status, language, nationality, migrant or refugee status, occupation or trade, political affiliation or conviction, race, religion, or sex, which includes intersex or sexual orientation". The Cabinet approved the bill in March 2018.

Human rights activists argue that, while it is already illegal to assault, murder and rape, the consequences for crimes motivated by hate need to be more severe than ordinary crimes. This is because, they say, hate crimes are "message crimes" that harm entire communities. According to the Hate Crimes Working Group, over a third of all crimes are motivated by prejudice, with most of these committed based on the victim's race, nationality or sexual orientation.

On the other hand, many legal experts believe the bill is unconstitutional and threatens freedom of speech. Human Rights Watch has expressed concern over the bill's language and potential to lead to significant restrictions on freedom of expression. Others have likened it to the Suppression of Communism Act, 1950.

=== National Intervention Strategy for LGBTI Communities ===
In August 2011, the Department of Justice established a National Task Team (NTT) to address the issue of hate crimes against LGBT people. In April 2014, Minister of Justice Jeff Radebe launched a National Intervention Strategy for LGBTI Communities developed by the NTT to address sex-based violence and gender-based violence against members of the community.

The NTT has established a rapid response team to attend to unsolved criminal cases as a matter of urgency and produced an information pamphlet with frequently asked questions about LGBTI persons. Radebe stated that the Department of Justice acknowledged the need for a specific legal framework for hate crimes and that the matter would be subjected to public debate.

=== Bullying in schools ===
South Africa does not possess a specific anti-bullying law. However, the Protection from Harassment Act 17 of 2011 brings widespread relief for all victims of homophobia and harassment, including children. The Child Justice Act 75 of 2008 aims to rehabilitate and to reconcile children under the age of 21. Depending on age, a bully can be held criminally liable for myriad criminal acts, including assault, intimidation, murder, culpable homicide, crimen injuria, racial and homophobic slurs, theft, malicious injury to property and arson, depending on the facts of each case.

According to the South African Department of Basic Education, South African pupils are the "most bullied kids in the world". In a 2015 survey from the Trends in International Mathematics and Science Study, 44% of participating Grade 5 students (age 10–11) reported being bullied weekly, and 34% monthly. This was the highest among the 38 countries surveyed. 48% of students in public schools reported being bullied weekly. Grade 9 students (age 14–15) were the third most bullied, behind Thailand and neighbouring Botswana, with 17% bullied weekly and 47% monthly.

== Military service ==
LGBT people are allowed to serve openly in the South African National Defence Force (SANDF). In 1996, the government adopted the White Paper on National Defence, which included the statement that, "In accordance with the Constitution, the SANDF shall not discriminate against any of its members on the grounds of sexual orientation."

In 1998, the Department of Defence adopted a Policy on Equal Opportunity and Affirmative Action, under which recruits may not be questioned about their sexual orientation and the Defence Force officially takes no interest in the lawful sexual behaviour of its members.

The Defence Act of 2002 makes it a criminal offence for any SANDF member or Defence Department employee to "denigrate, humiliate or show hostility or aversion" to any person on the grounds of sexual orientation. In 2002, the SANDF extended spousal medical and pension benefits to "partners in a permanent life-partnership".

== Transgender rights ==
The Alteration of Sex Description and Sex Status Act allows people to apply to have their sex status altered in the population registry, and consequently to receive identity documents and passports indicating their gender identity. The law requires the person to have undergone medical or surgical treatment, such as hormone replacement therapy (sex reassignment surgery is not required).

People can begin hormone replacement therapy when they turn 16 and can get surgeries when they turn 18, however, teenagers younger than 18 can receive surgeries with parental consent. Hormone treatment is available in both public and private healthcare sectors in South Africa. Patients who can afford to can access private care, which is mostly based in urban areas.

Transgender people from rural areas or provinces where gender-affirming care has little to no availability must travel long distances to major cities to access these services. In private sectors, gender-affirming healthcare costs hundreds of thousands of rands, while in the public system there are long waiting lists.

In October 2021, the Southern Africa HIV Clinicians Society published a gender-affirming healthcare guideline for South Africa. This was to address the significant gaps in knowledge and skills of healthcare providers.

A number of Labour Court rulings have found against employers that mistreated employees who underwent gender transition.

== Intersex rights ==
Intersex people in South Africa have some of the same rights as other people, but with significant gaps in protection from non-consensual cosmetic medical interventions and protection from discrimination. The country was the first to explicitly include Intersex people in anti-discrimination laws.

== Third gender rights ==
In 2021, the Department of Home Affairs announced plans to introduce gender-neutral identification on South African ID cards, making South Africa the first African country to do so (after Kenya, which has standardised identification for Intersex people only).

The Department of Home Affairs document on identity management states that South Africa has an estimated 530,000 non-binary residents. One of these individuals is Zade de Kock, a non-binary teenager who started an online petition to compel Home Affairs minister Aaron Motsoaledi to instate accurate gender markers for non-binary people on official documentation, stating that they suffered discrimination and gender dysphoria related to being forced to use inaccurate gender markers throughout schooling years.

The Department of Home Affairs head of policy, Sihle Mthiyane confirmed that it will take a few years for any changes to take place, as recommendations move through the consultation towards legislation and implementation, but the ID number will change to accommodate the LGBT+ community.

== Conversion therapy ==
A new bill was introduced to prohibit Conversion therapy in children in 2021, A practice which has not yet been banned under the Children's Act of 38 of 2005. According to the bill, the current legislative framework does not specifically prohibit the practice. The bill will amend this by inserting relevant definitions and that conversation therapy will be considered an offense under the Act.

Conversion therapy has a negative effect on the lives of LGBT people, and can lead to low self-esteem, depression and suicidal ideation. The South African Society of Psychiatrists states that "there is no scientific evidence that reparative or conversion therapy is effective in changing a person's sexual orientation. There is, however, evidence that this type of therapy can be destructive".

Despite this, conversion therapy is believed to be performed in the country. In February 2015, owners of a conversion therapy camp were found guilty of murder, child abuse and assault with intent to do grievous bodily harm after three teens were found dead at the camp. The teens, reportedly, were punched, beaten with spades and rubber pipes, chained to their beds, not allowed to use the toilets at any time and were forced to eat soap and their own feces, all with the aim of "curing" their homosexuality. The three teens were between 15 and 19 years old.

During apartheid, Dr. Aubrey Levin led The Aversion Project, a medical torture programme designed to identify gay soldiers and forcedly "cure" their homosexuality. This included forced castration and shock therapy. Vir Ander ("For Others" in Afrikaans, also a pun of the word "Verander" meaning "Change") premiered on 2 September 2017 at the South African State Theatre. The play is based on true events, where young Afrikaner men were subjected to conversion therapies. It deals with manhood, sexuality and acceptance, and shines a light on the horrors and atrocities of the practice.

== Blood donation ==
Until 2014, the South African National Blood Service imposed blood donation restrictions on men who have sex with men, requiring that they abstain from sex for at least six months before donating blood. This was replaced with a gender-neutral policy that disallows donations from any prospective donor who has had a new sexual partner in the last six months, or who has more than one sexual partner.

== Living conditions ==
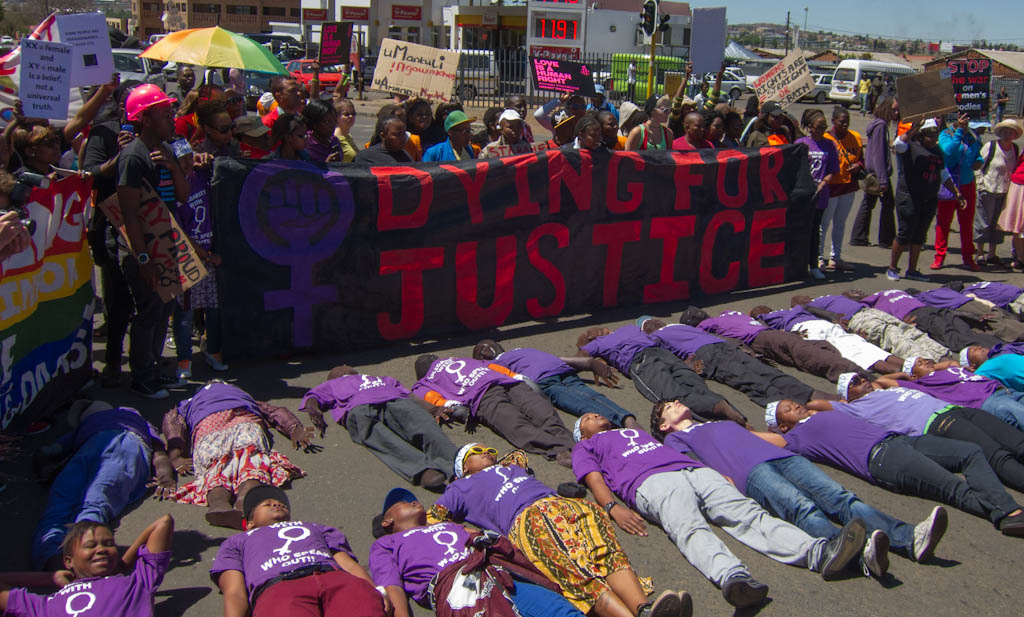
Soweto Pride 2012 participants protest against violence against lesbians with a "Dying for Justice" banner and T-shirts which read "Solidarity with women who speak out".

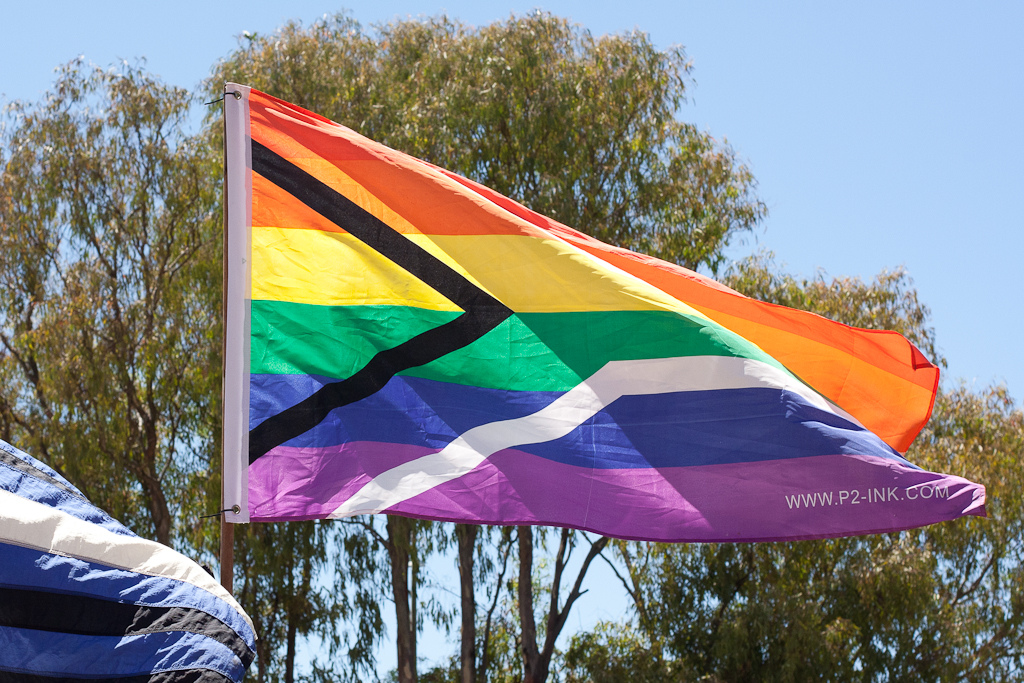
A South African gay pride flag flown at Cape Town Pride 2014

In 1998, National Party leader Marthinus van Schalkwyk denied accusations that he had paid a man for sex, by stating that he was a Boerseun (farmer's son), implying that homosexuality was not something to be found among Afrikaners. South African gay rights organisations called for an apology.

In May 2011, Professor Juan Nel told Amnesty International that according to studies of three of the nine provinces of South Africa, gay men are victims of homophobic sexual assault as frequently as gay women are, and suggested that under-reporting by male victims and the media has created the perception that they are at less risk of the crime.

As with female victims, gender non-conforming gay men are thought to be at the highest risk of violence, and activists have accused the police of negligent handling of incidents, including a series of nine allegedly related murders of gay men between 2010 and 2013.

Despite the occasional incidents of homophobia, gay people in major urban areas, such as Johannesburg, Pretoria, Durban and Cape Town, are fairly accepted, and all of these cities have a thriving gay nightlife. Cultural, arts, sports and outdoor activities play a major part in everyday South African gay life.

Annual Gay Pride events are held in Cape Town, Johannesburg, Durban, Pretoria and Soweto. Smaller cities such as Bloemfontein, Polokwane, Port Elizabeth, Mbombela, East London, Pietermaritzburg and Knysna, too, host LGBT-related events, clubs and bars. Knysna hosts the yearly Pink Loerie Mardi Gras, which attracts gay people from all over the country.

=== Sexual assault and rape ===
There have been a number of cases in which gay women have been the victims of murder, beating or rape. This has been posited, in part, to be because of the perceived threat they pose to traditional male authority.

South Africa has no specific hate crime legislation; human rights organisations have criticised the South African police for failing to address the matter of bias-motivated crimes. For example, the NGO ActionAid has condemned the continued impunity and accused governments of turning a blind eye to reported murders of lesbians in homophobic attacks in South Africa; as well as to so-called corrective rapes, including cases among pupils, in which cases the male rapists purport to raping the lesbian victim with the intent of thereby "curing" her of her sexual orientation.

Lesbian associations in South Africa, as well as Namibia, have attempted to combat corrective gang rape against lesbians.

=== Portrayal and representation in the media and society ===
Television and film produces programmes which also focus on gay life. Multiple soap operas showcase/have showcased LGBT life, some of the more notable have been the long-running and now cancelled soap opera Egoli which featured a long-term gay relationship.

SABC 1 has shown itself to be comparatively representative of the LGBT community in South Africa in its programming. The sitcom City Ses Top La features a gay character for which Warren Masemola received a SAFTA Award. One of the highest-rated soap operas on SABC 1 to feature LGBT characters was Generations, with the characters of star-crossed lovers Senzo (played by Thami Mngqolo) and Jason, who later married and had a child.

In the soap opera's current reincarnation as Generations:The Legacy, there is a transgender woman character by the name of Wandile and her host of LGBT friends and associates. The telenovela Uzalo also features a gay character by the name of GC (portrayed by Khaya Dladla), who was embroiled in a church dispute about his sexuality, illustrating the rural and urban demographic perceptions about sexuality in South Africa. The channel has also seen other successes in shows with LGBT characters such as Society, Intersexions, and After 9 amongst others.

Other soap operas to feature major LGBT characters have been: Steve (played by Emmanuel Castis) in Isidingo: The Need, Thula (played by Wright Ngubeni) in Rhythm City and Jerome (played by Terrence Bridget, a gay actor) in 7de Laan. The 2016 Mzansi Magic telenovela The Queen features Sello Maake Ka-Ncube playing a gay character.

Somizi and Mohale: The Union, which began streaming on Showmax on 24 February 2020, is a four-episode special focusing on the wedding of Somizi Mhlongo and Mohale Motaung. The first episode broke Showmax's viewership record as the show for the most views ever on its first day.

=== Politics, law and activism ===
The LGBT community in South Africa has a varied history of activism and representation in civil society, and all that pertains to social justice and the struggle for human rights as celebrated in February through LGBT History Month; Edwin Cameron and Kathy Satchwell being prominent judges of the Constitutional Court of South Africa and the High Court of South Africa respectively, including leading legal scholar Pierre de Vos.

There are active and visible LGBT student organisations at South African universities, including the University of the Witwatersrand, the University of Cape Town, the University of Stellenbosch, the University of Johannesburg and the University of the Western Cape, amongst others.

Simon Nkoli, Zackie Achmat and Funeka Soldaat are some of the more prominent LGBT rights activists in South Africa.

There have also been a number of LGBT politicians in the Parliament of South Africa and cabinet: Lynne Brown as Minister for Public Entreprises in Jacob Zuma's Cabinet (and also served as interim Premier of the Western Cape in 2008–2009), Zakhele Mbhele as Shadow Minister of Police, Mike Waters as the Opposition's Deputy Chief Whip from 2014 to 2019, MP Marius Redelinghuys and Ian Ollis as Shadow Minister of Labour from 2014 to 2017.

=== LGBT tourism ===
South Africa, due to its reputation as Africa's most gay-friendly destination, attracts thousands of LGBT tourists annually. The official South African Tourism site offers in-depth travel tips for gay travellers. Gay-friendly establishments are situated throughout South Africa and may be found on various gay travel websites.

Cape Town in particular is known for its gay tourism, and is home to South Africa's only gay village - the neighborhood of De Waterkant. The city hosts the annual Cape Town Pride march, and related festivities, and has a permanent rainbow crosswalk, and the Pink Lane, which takes visitors on a tour of LGBTQ+ community-related establishments.

=== Pink Rand ===
LGBT professionals are employed at major companies throughout the country. LGBT people are also targeted through various marketing campaigns, as the corporate world recognises the value of the Pink Rand. In 2012, Lunch Box Media undertook market research (Gay Consumer Profile) finding the LGBT market to comprise approximately slightly above 4 million people.

=== Religion ===
Prominent religious leaders have voiced their support for the South African LGBT community. In the Anglican Church of Southern Africa, the late Archbishop Emeritus of Cape Town Desmond Tutu was, and the current Archbishop of Cape Town, Thabo Makgoba, and Dr. Allan Boesak of the Uniting Reformed Church are vocal supporters of gay rights in South Africa.

The Dutch Reformed Church has ruled that gay members should not be discriminated against and can hold positions within the church. However, much criticism of the church still exists; in 2008 a court ruled against a church congregation for firing a gay musician; the issue provoked much uproar from the gay community and within liberal circles. In 2015, the church decided to bless same-sex relationships and allow gay ministers and clergy (who are not required to be celibate). The decision was reversed in 2016, but reinstated in 2019.

== Public opinion ==
Public opinion on same-sex marriage (2023) based on Ipsos
1. Same-sex couples should be allowed to marry legally (57.0%)
2. Same-sex couples should not be allowed to marry legally but should be allowed to have some legal recognition (10.0%)
3. Not sure (14.0%)
4. Same-sex couples should not be allowed to marry (19.0%)

A study conducted in 2015 by The Other Foundation and titled Progressive Prudes painted a more complex picture of public opinion in South Africa towards LGBT people. 55% indicated they would "accept" a gay family member and 51% stated their belief that "gay people should have the same human rights as all other citizens".

The survey found that, by a 2:1 ratio, South Africans supported retaining existing constitutional protections towards gay people. Those who "strongly disagreed" with allowing equal civil marriage rights for same-sex couples declined to just 23%.

A large survey released by Afrobarometer in 2016 suggested South Africa had the second-most tolerant views towards gay neighbours in Africa, after Cape Verde, with 67% of those surveyed reporting that they would either "strongly like, somewhat like or not care" if they lived next to a same-sex couple. This contrasted with the Africa-wide average of 21% and lows of just 3% in Senegal and 5% in Uganda and Niger.

According to a 2017 poll carried out by ILGA, 67% of South Africans agreed that gay, lesbian and bisexual people should enjoy the same rights as straight people, while 17% disagreed. Additionally, 72% agreed that they should be protected from workplace discrimination. 24% of South Africans, however, said that people who are in same-sex relationships should be charged as criminals, while a majority of 57% disagreed.

As for transgender people, 72% agreed that they should have the same rights, 74% believed they should be protected from employment discrimination and 64% believed they should be allowed to change their legal gender. Additionally, according to that same poll, 9% of South Africans would try to "change" a male neighbour's sexual orientation if they discovered he was gay, while 72% would accept and support him. 8% would try to "change" a female neighbour's sexual orientation, while 76% would accept her as she is.

A May 2021 Ipsos poll showed that 71% of South Africans supported some form of legal recognition for same-sex couples (59% of South Africans supported same-sex marriage, 12% supported civil partnerships but not marriage) while 15% were opposed to all legal recognition for same-sex couples, and 14% were undecided. In addition, 18% of South Africans had already attended the wedding of a same-sex couple.

There is increased support of LGBTQ rights from religious organisations, with 62% of Catholics in South Africa agreeing that homosexuality should be "accepted by society".

== Summary table ==
Rights	Yes/No	Notes
Status
Male same-sex sexual activity legal	Yes	(Since 1998)
Female same-sex sexual activity	Yes	(Female always legal)
Equal age of consent (16)	Yes	(Since 2007)
Discrimination Protections
Anti-discrimination laws in employment	Yes	(Since 1995)
Anti-discrimination laws in the provision of goods and services	Yes	(Since 1997)
Anti-discrimination laws in all other areas (incl. indirect discrimination, hate speech)	Yes	(Since 1997)
Anti-discrimination laws covering gender identity	Yes	
Prohibition of hate speech and hate crime based on gender identity	Yes	(Since 2024)
Prohibition of hate speech and hate crime based on sex, including intersex	Yes	(Since 2024)
Prohibition of hate speech and hate crime based on Sexual orientation	Yes	(Since 2024)
Ban on anti-LGBT censorship and expression	Yes	(No restrictions and censorship)
LGBT anti-bullying law in schools	No	(No specific law. However the laws like Harassment act of 2011 and The Child Justice act 75 of 2008 can be used)
Marriage and Family
Same-sex marriage(s)	Yes	(Since 2006)
Recognition of same-sex couples as de facto couples	Yes	(Since 1999)
Recognition of same-sex couples as civil partnerships	Yes	(Since 2006)
Stepchild adoption by same-sex couples	Yes	(Since 2002)
Joint adoption by same-sex couples	Yes	(Since 2002)
Adoption by a single LGBT person	Yes	
Foster care by single and Same-sex couples	Yes	
Access to IVF for lesbian couples	Yes	(Since 2003)
Automatic parenthood for both spouses after birth	Yes	
Commercial surrogacy for gay male couples	Yes	(Since 2003)
Parental leave for same-sex couples	Yes	(Since 2019)
Military Service
LGBT people allowed to serve openly in the military	Yes	(Since 1998)
Medical and Pension benefits for same-sex couples	Yes	(Since 2002)
Gender Identity Rights
Right to change legal gender	Yes	(Since 2003, requires hormonal or surgical treatment)
Coverage for Gender Reassignment surgeries	Yes	(since 2003, government funded in public hospitals)
Explicit protection on grounds of intersex within attribute of sex	Yes	(Since 2005)
Intersex minors protected from invasive surgical procedures	No	
Third gender option	No	(as of 2021 the law is pending)
Immigration Rights
Immigration equality (Recognition of same-sex couples in national laws)	Yes	(Since 1999)
Recognition for sexual orientation and gender identity for asylum seekers	Yes	(Since 1998)
Other
Conversion therapy banned on minors	No	(Bill proposed in 2021)
Corrective rape	Yes / No	(The statutory offence of rape is broadly defined, but it does not specifically make mention of corrective rape)
MSMs allowed to donate blood	Yes	(Since 2014)

== See also ==
- Human rights in South Africa
- Intersex rights in South Africa
- Cape Town Pride
- LGBTQ tourism in Cape Town
- LGBT events in South Africa
- LGBT rights in Africa
