= John Heher =

South African judge

Judge of the Supreme Court of Appeal
- In office 1 June 2003 – 2013
- Appointed by: Thabo Mbeki

Judge of the High Court
- In office 1993 – 31 May 2003
- Appointed by: F. W. de Klerk
- Division: Transvaal

Personal details
- Born: Jonathan Arthur Heher; 16 June 1943 (age 82) Cape Town, Cape Province; Union of South Africa
- Education: Durban High School
- Alma mater: University of Natal

Jonathan Arthur Heher (born 16 June 1943) is a South African retired judge who served in the Supreme Court of Appeal from 2003 to 2013. Formerly an advocate and Senior Counsel in Johannesburg, he joined the bench in 1993 as a judge of the Transvaal Provincial Division.

== Early life and education ==
Heher was born on 16 June 1943 in Mowbray, a suburb of Cape Town. He attended Overport Primary School and matriculated in 1959 at Durban High School. Thereafter he attended the University of Natal, where he completed a BA in 1962 and an LLB in 1964.

== Legal career ==
After graduating, Heher worked for the Department of Justice from 1965 to 1966, serving as a prosecutor and state advocate in the office of the attorney-general in Pietermaritzburg. Thereafter he was a legal adviser to the Johannesburg City Council until 1969. He was admitted as an advocate in April 1969 and practised at the Johannesburg Bar for the next 24 years, taking silk in 1985.

== Judicial career ==
In 1993, Heher joined the bench as a judge of the Transvaal Provincial Division, which at the time was a division of the Supreme Court of South Africa; it became a division of the High Court of South Africa after the end of apartheid.

While sitting in the Johannesburg High Court in 1998, Heher heard the National Coalition for Gay and Lesbian Equality's challenge to the common law offence of sodomy. Although Zackie Achmat later described Heher as having demonstrated personal discomfort with homosexual acts, Heher's judgement found that the criminalisation of sodomy was indeed discriminatory and unconstitutional. His order was unanimously upheld by the Constitutional Court in the landmark National Coalition for Gay and Lesbian Equality v Minister of Justice.

Heher was also an acting judge in the Supreme Court of Appeal between late 2001 and 2002. On 1 June 2003, he was elevated permanently to the Supreme Court of Appeal, where he served until his retirement in 2013.

== Fees Commission: 2016–2017 ==
In January 2016, amid the Fees Must Fall protests, President Jacob Zuma appointed Heher to chair a three-member commission of inquiry tasked with investigating the feasibility of fee-free higher education and training in South Africa. The commission began its public hearings in August 2016, and, though initially given only an eight-month mandate, it did not submit its final report until 30 August 2017. In his report, Heher recommended major investment in TVET institutions, but recommended that university education should be funded through income-contingent student loans underwritten by government.

== Personal life ==
He is married to Lorna Lynette Pentz, with whom he has two children. He was formerly a mediator in disciplinary matters of the Methodist Church of Southern Africa.
