= Henry Taberer =

South African cricketer

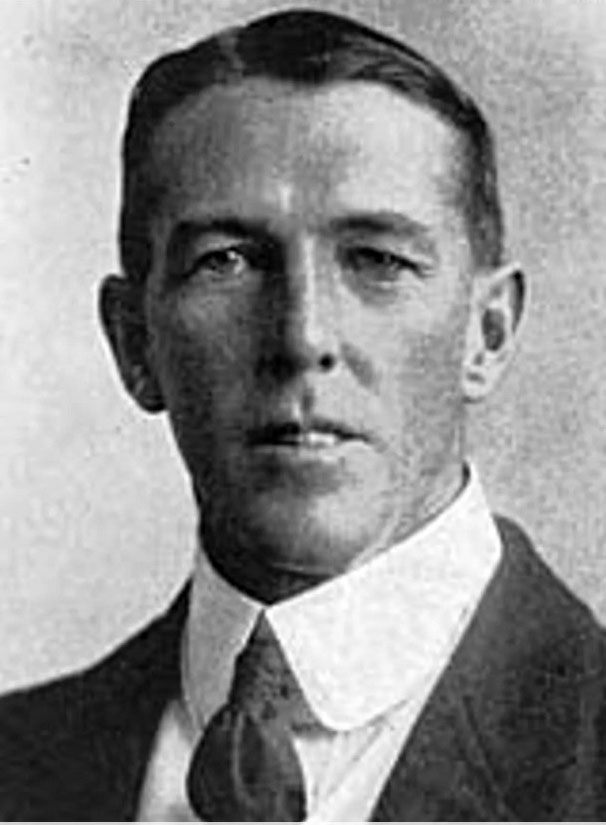

Personal information
- Full name: Henry Melville Taberer
- Born: 7 October 1870; Keiskammahoek, Cape Colony
- Died: 5 June 1932 (aged 61); Colesberg, Cape Province, South Africa
- Batting: Right-handed
- Bowling: Right-arm fast

International information
- National side: South Africa
- Only Test: 11 October 1902 v Australia

Career statistics
Competition	Test	First-class
Matches	1	11
Runs scored	2	222
Batting average	2.00	13.05
100s/50s	0/0	0/0
Top score	2	47*
Balls bowled	60	960
Wickets	1	22
Bowling average	48.00	20.27
5 wickets in innings	0	0
10 wickets in match	0	0
Best bowling	1/25	4/14
Catches/stumpings	0/–	5/–
- Source: CricketArchive

Henry Melville Taberer (7 October 1870 – 5 June 1932) was a South African cricketer who played in one Test match in 1902, when he captained South Africa. He was the son of the Revd C. Taberer and was born at a mission station in Keiskammahoek, Cape Colony.

== Career ==
Taberer attended St. Andrew's College, Grahamstown, from January 1883 to June 1892. He played in St. Andrew's cricket XI and rugby XV. At Keble College, Oxford, he attained a B.A. (Hon) in Theology. His brother was Bill Taberer, an international rugby player.

Taberer represented Oxford University in 1891 and 1892 but did not gain a Blue, which is awarded to those selected for the annual intervarsity match against Cambridge at Lord's. The South African Review remarked that "favouritism of the grossest kind robbed [Taberer] forever of the great, trebly great, honour of a triple blue". He appeared for Oxford against Cambridge in both athletics (long jump) and rugby union. He played for Essex in 1892 and 1893, before the county achieved first-class status.

Taberer had an intermittent cricket career in South Africa, appearing for Natal, Transvaal and Rhodesia. On his one Test appearance he captained the side, but he scored only two runs and took just one wicket, that of Victor Trumper. The match was his last first-class cricket appearance, with a gap of more than seven years to his previous first-class appearance. He was later prominent in South African cricket administration.

=== Career in colonial administration ===
Taberer was born on a mission station and was a fluent speaker of the languages used by the local population: he claimed to speak them more fluently than he did English. He was able to use this talent effectively when he became manager of the South African government's Native Labour Bureau and adviser to the Native Recruiting Corporation for the Chamber of Mines at a time of increasing industrial unrest. It has been suggested that because of Taberer's role "it was no surprise, therefore, that the NRC also sponsored the new Native Recruitment Cup played for by provincial African cricket teams, once the earlier 'Barnato' competition, which had included cricketers of all ethnic groups, had folded."

Taberer was the Secretary for Zululand in 1894, an acting magistrate in Eshowe, Zululand, in 1895. From April 1896 to 1900 he was Controller of Cattle in Southern Rhodesia from April 1896 to 1900; He was also the Chief Native Commissioner in Mashonaland in 1895. He was a captain in the Umtali Volunteer regiment and served through the Mashonaland rebellion (1896–97), he was twice mentioned in despatches. He died at Colesberg, Cape Province in 1932.

== See also ==
- Taberer report
