= Taberer report =

1907 report composed by Henry Taberer and J. Glenn Leary

Taberer report is a report published in 1907 and composed by Henry Taberer and J. Glenn Leary.

The work demonstrated evidence of male same-sex relationships in gold mines near Johannesburg, South Africa.

== Background ==
Taberer was born on a mission station and was a fluent speaker of the languages used by the local population: he claimed to speak them more fluently than he did English. He was able to use this talent effectively when he became manager of the South African government's Native Labour Bureau and adviser to the Native Recruiting Corporation for the Chamber of Mines at a time of increasing industrial unrest. Leary was another respected official and he worked as a magistrate.

A large disparity between the sexes existed within the Mozambican migrant worker community in South Africa. In 1886, there were 30,000 men but only 90 women of Mozambican descent in the Johannesburg region.

Before the establishment of colonial criminal labour systems, homosexual relationships were not punished.

== Report ==
Taberer and Leary were tasked with researching "mine marriages" between male African miners. Local missionaries had complained about immoralities that happened in the gold mines, and the complaints resulted in the investigation. Taberer coauthored the report with Leary. The report was based on evidence collected during a nine-day period in January 1907. Testimonies were gathered from 54 African and European witnesses. The questions and answers were remarkably explicit about sexual activity and motivations.

A Chopi miner working in the mines explained to Taberer that miners who engaged in homosexual acts with young men tried to avoid contracting a venereal disease. The view is supported by evidence that there were lower rates of venereal disease among Tsonga people compared to those Africans who visited female prostitutes. The report successfully dismissed claims by Reverend Baker that the homosexual relations were violent and formed as formal marriages. Relationships between miners often included sex, but male "wives" also gave domestic services to their partners.

Taberer and Leary proposed several solutions for curtailing homosexual relationships between miners, but they were rejected. For instance, they proposed that large numbers of female wives should be allowed to migrate with the men or that large-scale prostitution should be allowed. Ultimately, only screens around beds were banned throughout all industrial compounds in South Africa.

=== Reliability ===
Taberer's neutrality can be questioned. Taberer and Leary's approach for collecting data minimised the amount of recorded anal sex. It has also been argued that the methodology of the interviews conducted was biased in its tendency to ask leading questions regarding the suspected ethnic origin of "mine marriages".

== See also ==
- Kinsey reports
- Men who have sex with men
- Prison sexuality
- Timeline of LGBT history in South Africa
