= Klaas Blank =

Khoi convict executed for sodomy in Cape Town

- Born: c. 1705
- Died: 1735 (aged 29–30); Table Bay, Cape Town, Dutch Cape Colony
- Cause of death: Execution by drowning
- Known for: First recorded death sentence for sodomy in Cape Town

Klaas Blank (c. 1705 – 1735), also known as Jantie or Claas Blank, was a Khoi convict in the Dutch Cape Colony. In 1735, he and a fellow convict, Rijkhaart Jacobz, became the first individuals recorded to have been sentenced to death and executed for the crime of sodomy in Cape Town.

== Life ==
Klaas Blank was born around 1705. As a youth, he entered the employ of the settler farmer Matthijs van den Berg at Riebeeck Kasteel as a cattle herder. His employment ended with his arrest in 1715 for the theft of livestock. Judicial records describe the crime as involving cattle taken from another farmer's post. Blank transported a number of these animals to Cape Town, where he sold them to two local burghers. In his defence, Blank implicated his superior, Andries Baster, claiming he had been persuaded to commit the theft with the promise of payment in trade goods. The court arrested Baster, but he denied the allegations and was ultimately released.

At his trial, Blank appealed for mercy, attributing his actions to folly. He was convicted, and in 1718 was sentenced to a fifty-year term of imprisonment on Robben Island.

During his imprisonment, Blank was periodically sent with work parties to nearby islands. Evidence presented at his later trial indicated that he and a fellow convict, Rijkhaart Jacobz (c. 1700–1735) of Rotterdam, were seen committing sodomy as early as 1724 on Dassen Island, where they had been sent by prison authorities to collect seal blubber. The sergeant in charge on Robben Island was reportedly informed of these acts but took no action. He was later relieved of his post, partly for this reason.

His replacement adopted a harsher regime. Through severe beating, he obtained a confession from Jacobz regarding multiple occasions on which he and Blank had engaged in sexual acts. These confessions were subsequently confirmed in court before the Court of Justice in Cape Town. Blank and Jacobz were convicted of sodomy. In 1735, when both men were in their mid-thirties, they were executed by drowning in Table Bay.

== Legal and historical context ==
The case of Klaas Blank was not isolated. Under Dutch Roman law, which was applied in the colony, sodomy was a capital crime. Between 1705 and 1792, the Court of Justice in Cape Town conducted approximately 150 trials for sodomy, involving more than 200 men. The severity of the sentence depended on the specific acts proven: the death penalty was reserved for "actual sodomy" (anal intercourse), while lesser acts such as attempted sodomy or mutual masturbation were punished by flogging, banishment, or forced labour.

Blank's and Jacobz's relationship is considered to be the first documented same-sex relationship in modern-day South Africa. Canadian film director John Greyson and scriptwriter Jack Lewis, after discovering the case in archives in South Africa, used it as a base for the feature film Proteus (2003).

== See also ==
- LGBT history in South Africa
