= Bill Taberer =

South African rugby union player

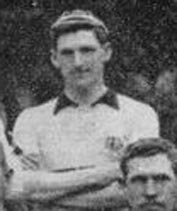
- Born: Walter Stringfellow Taberer; 11 April 1872 King William's Town, Cape Colony
- Died: 10 February 1938 (aged 65) Bulawayo, Rhodesia
- School: St. Andrew's College
- Notable relative(s): Henry Taberer, brother

Rugby union career
- Position: Centre
Provincial / State sides
Years	Team	Apps	(Points)
- Griqualand West
- Correct as of 19 July 2010
International career
Years	Team	Apps	(Points)
1896	South Africa	1	(0)
- Correct as of 19 July 2010

Walter Stringfellow Taberer (11 April 1872 – 10 February 1938) was a South African international rugby union player. Born in King William's Town, he attended St. Andrew's College, Grahamstown, where he was a Douglass Scholar before playing provincial rugby for Griqualand West. He made his only Test appearance for South Africa during Great Britain's 1896 tour. He played as a centre in the 2nd Test of the series, a 17–8 South Africa loss. Taberer died in 1938, in Bulawayo, at the age of 65.

He also played first-class cricket for Rhodesia.

He was a Southern Rhodesian civil servant.
