= Du Toit v Minister for Welfare and Population Development =

South African legal case

- Court: Constitutional Court of South Africa
- Full case name: Du Toit and Another v Minister for Welfare and Population Development and Others
- Decided: 10 September 2002
- Citations: [2002] ZACC 20, 2002 (10) BCLR 1006 (CC), 2003 (2) SA 198 (CC)

Case history
- Prior action: Application for confirmation from Transvaal Provincial Division

Court membership
- Judges sitting: Chaskalson CJ, Langa DCJ, Ackermann, Goldstone, Kriegler, Madala, Ngcobo, O'Regan & Sachs JJ, Du Plessis & Skweyiya AJJ

Case opinions
- Statutory provisions which prohibit joint adoption by same-sex couples violate the principle of the paramountcy of the best interests of the child, amount to unfair discrimination on the basis of sexual orientation and marital status, and infringe the right to dignity. They are therefore inconsistent with the Constitution and invalid. (Unanimous.)
- Decision by: Skweyiya

Keywords
- LGBT adoption, discrimination, recognition of same-sex relationships

Du Toit and Another v Minister for Welfare and Population Development and Others is a decision of the Constitutional Court of South Africa which granted same-sex couples the ability to jointly adopt children. LGBT people had already been able to adopt children individually, but only married couples could adopt jointly; the decision was handed down in September 2002, four years before same-sex marriage became legal in South Africa. The court ruled unanimously that the statutory provisions limiting joint adoption to married couples were unconstitutional, and the resulting order amended the law to treat same-sex partners in the same way as married couples.

The case was brought in 2001 by Suzanne du Toit and Anna-Marié de Vos, who had been partners since 1989. They adopted two children in 1995, but because the law did not allow adoption by unmarried partners, de Vos was the children's only legal parent. They applied to the Transvaal Provincial Division of the High Court to have the relevant provisions of the Child Care Act and the Guardianship Act declared unconstitutional on three grounds: that they unfairly discriminated against du Toit and de Vos on the prohibited grounds of sexual orientation and marital status, that they infringed on du Toit's right to dignity, and that they violated the principle that the best interests of the child are paramount in situations involving children. The government did not oppose their application, and on 28 September 2001 the High Court ruled in their favour and ordered words to be "read in" to the acts to give "permanent same-sex life partners" the same rights as married spouses.

South Africa's constitution requires that any court order invalidating an Act of Parliament be confirmed by the Constitutional Court. That court heard argument on 9 May 2002, including a report by a curator ad litem representing the interests of the children, and a submission by the Lesbian and Gay Equality Project as amicus curiae relating to the welfare of children of same-sex partners in the event of a breakup. The court handed down its ruling on 10 September, unanimously agreeing with the High Court's judgment and confirming its order.

The Child Care Act and Guardianship Act were subsequently repealed and replaced by the Children's Act, which was enacted in June 2006 although the adoption-related provisions only came into force in April 2010. It allows for adoption by married couples and by "partners in a permanent domestic life-partnership" regardless of gender. In the interim, same-sex marriage became legal in November 2006, and is legally equivalent to opposite-sex marriage for all purposes, including adoption.

== See also ==
- LGBT adoption
- LGBT rights in South Africa
