= Gay flag of South Africa =

LGBT pride symbol

- Use: Represent the South African LGBT community
- Proportion: 2:3
- Adopted: 2010 (public launch); 2012 (heraldic registration)
- Design: A field divided horizontally into six equal bands of red, orange, yellow, green, blue and purple, surmounted horizontally from the hoist of a white pall in umbra the edge to the hoist in black
- Designed by: Eugene Brockman

The gay flag of South Africa is a pride flag that aims to reflect the freedom and diversity of South Africa and build pride in being an LGBTQ South African. It was registered as the flag of the LGBTQ Association of South Africa in 2012 and is not an official symbol of South Africa.

== Design ==
Designed by Eugene Brockman, the flag is a hybrid of the South African national flag, which was launched in 1994 after the end of the apartheid era, and the LGBT rainbow flag. Brockman said "I truly believe we (the LGBT community) put the dazzle into our rainbow nation and this flag is a symbol of just that". The stated purposes of the flag include celebrating legal same-sex marriage in South Africa and addressing issues such as discrimination, homophobia and corrective rape.

== History ==
The flag was launched on 18 December 2010 at the Mother City Queer Project costume party which is held annually and took place that year at the new Cape Town Stadium.

On 20 July 2012, the flag was registered at South Africa's Bureau of Heraldry as a heraldic flag representing the LGBT Association of South Africa. It is not an official national symbol, and not the only South African version of the LGBT rainbow flag.

== Gallery ==
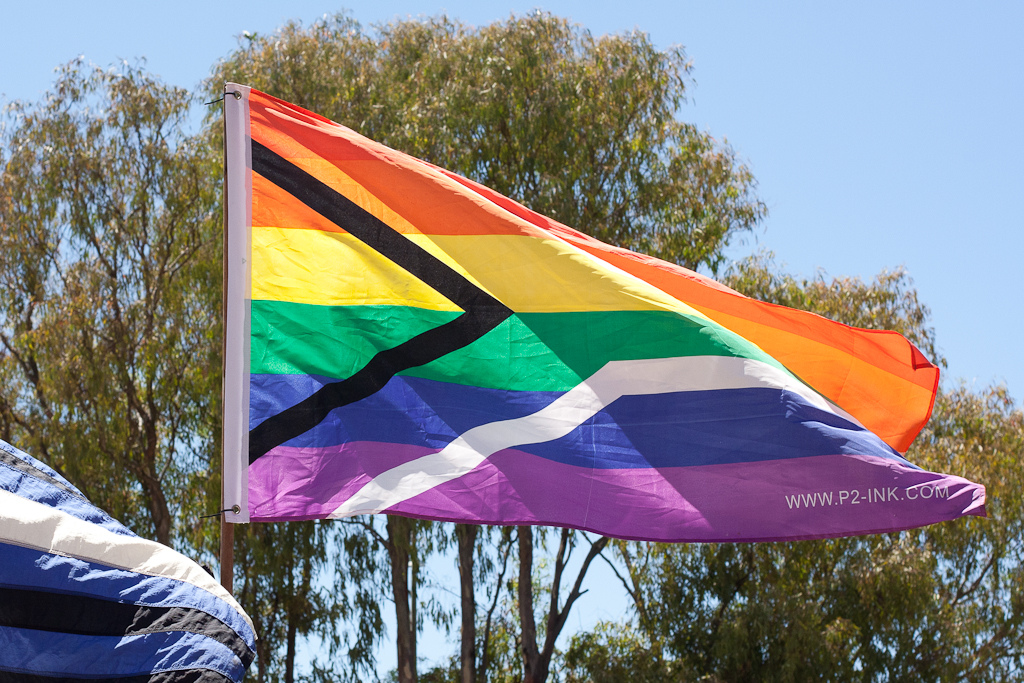
Flag flying at Cape Town Pride 2014

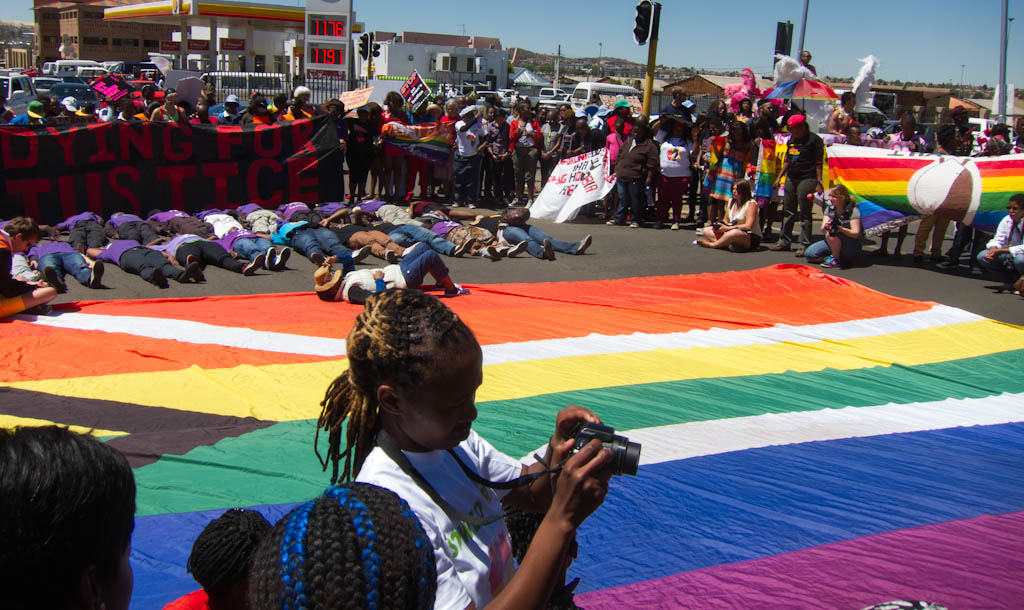
Giant flag at Soweto Pride 2012, with participants protesting against violence against lesbians

== See also ==
- LGBT rights in South Africa
