= Geldenhuys v National Director of Public Prosecutions =

South African legal case

- Court: Constitutional Court of South Africa
- Full case name: Geldenhuys v National Director of Public Prosecutions and Others
- Decided: 26 November 2008
- Citations: [2008] ZACC 21, 2009 (2) SA 310 (CC), 2009 (1) SACR 231 (CC), 2009 (5) BCLR 435 (CC)

Case history
- Appealed from: Supreme Court of Appeal (S v Geldenhuys [2008] ZASCA 47)

Court membership
- Judges sitting: Langa CJ, Moseneke DCJ, Madala, Mokgoro, Ngcobo, O'Regan, Sachs, Van der Westhuizen & Yacoob JJ

Case opinions
- Decision by: Justice Mokgoro

Geldenhuys v National Director of Public Prosecutions and Others is a decision of the Constitutional Court of South Africa which struck down as unconstitutional a law which set the age of consent at 19 for homosexual sex but only 16 for heterosexual sex.

== Background ==
Section 14(1) of the Sexual Offences Act, 1957, as amended in 1969 and 1988, read as follows:

(1) Any male person who—

(a) has or attempts to have unlawful carnal intercourse with a girl under the age of 16 years; or
(b) commits or attempts to commit with such a girl or with a boy under the age of 19 years an immoral or indecent act; or
(c) solicits or entices such a girl or boy to the commission of an immoral or indecent act,

shall be guilty of an offence.

Section 14(3), added in 1988, contained a mirror provision with the genders inverted. The effect of these sections was to fix the age of consent at 16 for heterosexual sex and 19 for homosexual sex.

The Interim Constitution of South Africa, which came into force in 1994, contained a provision prohibiting discrimination on the basis of sexual orientation, and this provision was preserved in the final Constitution of South Africa, which came into force in 1997. In 1998, in the case of National Coalition for Gay and Lesbian Equality v Minister of Justice, the Constitutional Court struck down as unconstitutional the laws prohibiting consensual sex between men, based on the prohibition of discrimination and the right to privacy. That case did not address the unequal age of consent, although in his judgment Justice Ackermann took note of it without commenting on its constitutionality.

In 2007 Parliament enacted the Criminal Law (Sexual Offences and Related Matters) Amendment Act, which codified and reformed the law on sexual offences. It repealed section 14 of the Sexual Offences Act, and fixed a uniform age of consent of 16. This reform did not, however, have retrospective effect.

== History of the case ==
Geldenhuys was convicted in 2005 in the Pretoria Regional Court on ten charges of "committing an immoral or indecent act with a boy under the age of nineteen years" in contravention of section 14(1)(b). Four of the charges related to acts committed when the boy was aged fourteen and fifteen, while the other six related to acts committed when he was sixteen or older. The total sentence handed down was eleven years' imprisonment.

Geldenhuys appealed to the Transvaal Provincial Division of the High Court on several grounds. He attacked the correctness of the verdict on the evidence presented; he also asserted that it was unconstitutional to prohibit consensual sex with a person over the age of twelve because the common law regarded twelve as the age at which a child was capable of consenting; and he attacked the sentence. The issue of discrimination on the basis of sexual orientation was not raised at this stage. The appeal against conviction was rejected, but the sentence was reduced to seven years.

Geldenhuys appealed further to the Supreme Court of Appeal (SCA). The arguments made in the High Court were rejected by the SCA as they had been in the lower court. However, before the hearing the SCA pointed out the possible unconstitutionality of the unequal age of consent, and invited argument on that point. Both parties agreed that the law discriminated unfairly on the basis of sexual orientation and the government conceded that there was no justification for the discrimination. The court consequently found that sections 14(1)(b) and 14(3)(b) were unconstitutional because they violated section nine of the Constitution, and that the words "under the age of 19 years" should be struck out and replaced by the words "under the age of 16 years". The conviction of Geldenhuys on the six later charges was set aside.

== Judgment ==
The SCA's order was referred to the Constitutional Court for confirmation, in compliance with the requirement that any court order declaring an Act of Parliament to be unconstitutional be confirmed by the Constitutional Court before it has effect. The court heard oral argument on 28 August 2008 and handed down its unanimous decision, authored by Justice Mokgoro, on 26 November.

The argument for Geldenhuys was simple: the inequality in the age of consent was discrimination on the basis of sexual orientation; there was no justification for the discrimination; and therefore it was unconstitutional. Consequently, the SCA was correct in altering the affected sections to reduce the age limit from 19 to 16. The National Prosecuting Authority (NPA) conceded the unconstitutionality, but argued that the age limits in sections 14(1)(b) and 14(3)(b) should be set at a uniform 18 rather than 16. The NPA justified this argument by reference to the legal definition of "child" as including all people under the age of 18, and to the fact that 18 was the age limit in other related laws, such as those prohibiting child pornography.

The court rejected the NPA's argument, pointing out that it would create an incongruity in the law. Firstly, the effect of the NPA's proposal would be to set the age of consent at 16 for acts termed "carnal intercourse" but 18 for those termed "immoral or indecent acts", and this would in fact cause the unconstitutional discrimination to persist, as "carnal intercourse" was understood to include only heterosexual sex. Secondly, Parliament had already chosen to set 16 as the uniform age of consent in the 2007 amendment act.

The Constitutional Court therefore confirmed unaltered the order of the Supreme Court of Appeal. The words "under the age of 19 years" were to be replaced by the words "under the age of 16 years" in sections 14(1)(b) and 14(3)(b) of the Sexual Offences Act, and, subject to certain limitations, the order was made retrospective to 27 April 1994, the date on which the Interim Constitution came into force.

== See also ==
- LGBT rights in South Africa
