= National Coalition for Gay and Lesbian Equality v Minister of Justice =

South African legal case

- Court: Constitutional Court of South Africa
- Full case name: National Coalition for Gay and Lesbian Equality and Another v Minister of Justice and Others
- Decided: 9 October 1998
- Citations: [1998] ZACC 15, 1999 (1) SA 6 (CC), 1998 (12) BCLR 1517 (CC)

Case history
- Prior action: Referral from Witwatersrand Local Division

Court membership
- Judges sitting: Chaskalson P, Langa DP, Ackermann, Goldstone, Kriegler, Mokgoro, O'Regan, Sachs & Yacoob JJ

Case opinions
- The common-law crime of sodomy and section 20A of the Sexual Offences Act are inconsistent with the Constitution, and therefore invalid, because they infringe the rights to equality, dignity and privacy. (Unanimous.)
- Decision by: Ackermann

Keywords
- LGBT rights, sodomy law

National Coalition for Gay and Lesbian Equality and Another v Minister of Justice and Others is a decision of the Constitutional Court of South Africa which struck down the laws prohibiting consensual sexual activities between men. Basing its decision on the Bill of Rights in the Constitution – and in particular its explicit prohibition of discrimination based on sexual orientation – the court unanimously ruled that the crime of sodomy, as well as various other related provisions of the criminal law, were unconstitutional and therefore invalid.

The case was the first in a series of Constitutional Court rulings advancing LGBT rights in South Africa which culminated in the case Minister of Home Affairs and Another v Fourie and Another, a judgment which led to the legalisation of same-sex marriage in South Africa by the Civil Union Act, 2006. In the interim the court extended to same-sex couples immigration-related rights, pension benefits, the ability to adopt, and parental rights over children conceived by artificial insemination.

Argument in the case was heard on 27 August 1998 before President of the Constitutional Court Arthur Chaskalson, Deputy President Pius Langa, and Justices Ackermann, Goldstone, Kriegler, Mokgoro, O'Regan, Sachs and Yacoob. The decision was handed down on 9 October of the same year; the majority judgment was authored by Justice Ackermann, while Justice Sachs wrote a separate concurring judgment.

== History ==
=== Sodomy in South African law ===
South Africa inherited the crime of "sodomy" from the Roman-Dutch law, which was introduced by the Dutch East India Company settlers at the Cape, and still forms the basis of South African law. In the Roman-Dutch law, sodomy originally encompassed a number of sexual acts considered unnatural, including heterosexual anal sex, masturbation and bestiality, as well as homosexual sex. Over time, however, in South African common law it was reduced to refer only to male-male anal sex, the legal definition being "unlawful and intentional sexual intercourse per anum between human males". The common law also prohibited "unnatural sexual offences", defined as "the unlawful and intentional commission of an unnatural sexual act by one person with another person"; the definition of "unnatural" had been held to include fellatio, mutual masturbation and intercrural sex, but it only applied to acts between men and not to acts between a man and a woman.

"Sodomy" and "unnatural sexual offences" were common law crimes, derived from the Roman-Dutch law and developed by judges. South African statute law also contained, in section 20A of the Sexual Offences Act, a provision known as the "men at a party" offence; this criminalized any sexual acts between men at a party, where "a party" was defined as any occasion with more than two people present.

Gay men were frequently prosecuted under these laws until about 1970, after which date prosecutions for private consensual sex became less common. Nonetheless, they remained on the books as prosecutable offences. In particular, sodomy was listed as a Schedule 1 offence in the Criminal Procedure Act, placing it in the same category as murder, rape and fraud. This listing also allowed police officers to arrest people suspected of sodomy without a warrant, and to use deadly force against them if they attempted to flee.

=== Prior case law ===
In the 1993 case of S v H the defendant plead guilty in the Magistrate's Court to a charge of sodomy, and received a suspended sentence of one year's imprisonment; the act alleged was private and consensual. The conviction was reviewed by Judge Lourens Ackermann in the Cape Provincial Division of the Supreme Court. At that time, before the Interim Constitution and its Bill of Rights had come into force, the conviction was valid in law and the court did not reverse it; however, the sentence was replaced by a nominal caution and discharge. Judge Ackermann referred to the various draft constitutional texts then under negotiation, and pointed out that the drafts proposed by the ANC, the DP and the IFP all explicitly forbade discrimination based on sexual orientation, while the draft proposed by the NP-controlled government forbade discrimination on the basis of "natural characteristics". He used these facts to justify a ruling that custodial sentences were not appropriate for cases of consensual private sodomy. Significantly, he also wrote:

"The aforegoing suggests broad consensus on eliminating discrimination against homosexuality and the likelihood that this will be entrenched in a new constitutional dispensation. If this were to happen it is difficult to see how common law or statutory offences which proscribe private 'unnatural acts' between consenting adult men can escape being struck down."

The Interim Constitution, which came into force on 27 April 1994, did indeed explicitly prohibit discrimination on the basis of sexual orientation. The first challenge to the sodomy laws under this new dispensation came in the case of S v Adendolf; however, this appeal was rejected by the Cape Provincial Division because the alleged sex was nonconsensual, and the court regarded the question of constitutionality as purely theoretical. The court did state that they would have considered the case had the act in question been consensual.

S v Kampher was such a case of consensual sex, although distinguished by the fact that it had occurred between prisoners in a correctional centre. The defendant was sentenced to a year's imprisonment, suspended for three years. The conviction and sentence was reviewed by Judge Ian Farlam in the Cape Provincial Division; he specifically questioned whether the crime of sodomy was compatible with the anti-discrimination and privacy provisions of the Constitution. The magistrate who had convicted Kampher claimed that it was compatible, referring to Ackermann's judgment in S v H, which had suggested that sex between prison inmates might be a "special situation" in which the state had a legitimate interest in proscribing sexual relationships. The Attorney-General of the Cape disputed this, submitting that the crime of sodomy was indeed incompatible with the Bill of Rights. The court agreed with the Attorney-General and set aside the conviction and sentence; it did not, however, strike down the crime of sodomy in general.

== The High Court judgment ==
The final Constitution, which came into force on 4 February 1997, contained similar equality protections to those in the Interim Constitution, providing in section 9(3) that:

"The state may not unfairly discriminate directly or indirectly against anyone on one or more grounds, including race, gender, sex, pregnancy, marital status, ethnic or social origin, colour, sexual orientation, age, disability, religion, conscience, belief, culture, language and birth."

In 1997 the National Coalition for Gay and Lesbian Equality, an association representing a broad spectrum of South African LGBT organisations, launched a constitutional challenge in the Witwatersrand Local Division of the High Court. The Coalition was joined as applicant by the South African Human Rights Commission, an independent chapter nine institution created by the Constitution and tasked with the promotion and protection of human rights. Named as respondents were the Minister of Justice, the national minister responsible for criminal law; the Minister of Safety and Security, the national minister responsible for policing; and the Attorney General of the Witwatersrand, the official responsible for prosecutions in the Witwatersrand Division. (The position of Attorney General has since been replaced by that of Director of Public Prosecutions within the National Prosecuting Authority.)

The applicants asked the High Court to:

- invalidate as unconstitutional the common-law offences of sodomy and commission of an unnatural sexual act, and section 20A of the Sexual Offences Act (the "men at a party" offence).
- invalidate any conviction for any of the three offences for acts committed after 27 April 1994 (the date that the Interim Constitution came into force) if the case was still under appeal or review.
- invalidate the inclusion of sodomy as a Schedule 1 offence in the Criminal Procedure Act, 1977 (which had the effect that people could be arrested without a warrant on reasonable suspicion of having committed sodomy, and deadly force could be used to prevent fleeing from arrest), and its inclusion in the Schedule of the Security Officers Act, 1987 (which had the effect of disqualifying those convicted of sodomy from being registered as security officers).
- invalidate any action taken under the authority of the inclusion of sodomy in Schedule 1 of the CPA or the Schedule of the Security Officers Act.

The Minister of Justice only opposed the last of these requests, and after the applicants withdrew it the government did not offer any opposition to the case. The applicants also withdrew the second request – the blanket invalidation of past convictions – as they realised that some convictions related to non-consensual acts and should instead be converted into convictions for indecent assault.

The applicants argued that because the offences applied only to men and only to sex between men, they infringed the equality clause of the Constitution because they unfairly discriminated in terms of gender and sexual orientation. They also argued that "commission of an unnatural sexual offence" was so vaguely defined that it was not compatible with the rule of law, as a person could not be certain what acts it criminalised.

The High Court's judgment, authored by Judge Jonathan Heher and handed down on 8 May 1998, considered each of the attacked offences in terms of the equality guarantee in the Constitution. The offence of sodomy, he ruled, amounted to unfair discrimination both in terms of gender, because it criminalised an act between men that would not be a crime between a man and a woman, and in terms of sexual orientation, because anal intercourse is the gay male analogue to vaginal intercourse for heterosexuals. He then examined whether the discrimination could be justified, and observed that the only arguments for justification were based on prejudice or religious beliefs, which are irrelevant in a constitutional secular state; protection of public morals, which could be achieved by non-discriminatory sex offence laws; or the prevailing public opinion. Addressing the last point, the judgment referred to S v Makwanyane, in which the Constitutional Court had abolished the death penalty despite acknowledging that the weight of public opinion was opposed to abolition. The court therefore ruled that the offence of sodomy was inconsistent with the Constitution and invalid.

Considering the offence of "commission of an unnatural sexual act", Judge Heher dismissed the vagueness argument, and stated that there were some acts potentially covered by the offence – bestiality being an example – that should remain criminalised. He did accept, however, that the offence had primarily been used to prosecute gay men, and ruled that it was discriminatory and unjustifiable, and therefore invalid, to the extent that it criminalised acts between men that would not be criminal between women or between a man and a woman. Continuing to section 20A of the Sexual Offences Act, Judge Heher ruled that, as in the case of sodomy, it was discriminatory in terms of both gender and sexual orientation. Looking to justification, he proposed that Parliament might have enacted the section for the purpose of suppressing "sexual license", but considered that since the government had not seen fit to criminalise similar heterosexual or lesbian activities, the argument was not persuasive.

The offence of sodomy having been declared to be invalid and unconstitutional, it followed that its inclusion in the Schedules to the CPA and the Security Officers Act must also be invalid.

== Confirmation by the Constitutional Court ==
The common law offence of sodomy is declared to be inconsistent with the Constitution of the Republic of South Africa, 1996 and invalid.

— Justice Ackermann, Order of the Court

South African law requires that court orders declaring acts of Parliament to be unconstitutional be confirmed by the Constitutional Court; the High Court therefore referred its order to the Constitutional Court for confirmation. The court heard argument from the applicants on 27 August 1998; the government did not oppose the application and presented no argument.

The Constitutional Court handed down its decision on 9 October 1998; the judges were unanimous in confirming the order of the High Court. The majority judgment was written by Justice Lourens Ackermann, while Justice Albie Sachs authored a separate concurrence. The court, recognising that the criminalisation of sodomy was clearly discrimination, assessed the fairness or otherwise of the discrimination by examining its effects on the groups affected, i.e. gay men and, indirectly, lesbians. Referring frequently to an influential article written by Edwin Cameron, then a professor and now himself a Constitutional Court judge, it observed that the sodomy laws "[reinforce] already existing societal prejudices" and worsen the effects of those prejudices, reducing gay men to "unapprehended felons" and thereby encouraging discrimination against them.

The court referred to the judgments of the European Court of Human Rights in Norris v. Ireland and of the Supreme Court of Canada in Vriend v. Alberta, finding that heterosexist discrimination causes psychological harm to gays and lesbians and affects their dignity and self-esteem. It also observed that the criminalisation of sodomy legitimises blackmail, entrapment and "queer-bashing". Noting that gay men are a permanent minority in society who have been severely affected by discrimination, and that the conduct that is criminalised is consensual and causes no harm to others, the judgment determined that the discrimination is unfair and therefore infringes on the constitutional right to equality.

The judgment then proceeded to examine the sodomy laws against the constitutional rights to human dignity and privacy. Observing that the laws punish an act that society associates with homosexuality and thereby stigmatise gay men, as well as putting them at risk of prosecution for "[engaging] in sexual conduct which is part of their experience of being human", the court determined that the right to dignity was infringed.

Dealing with privacy, the court referred again to Cameron's article; he had suggested that the argument based on privacy was inadequate because it implied that the protection against discrimination should be limited to tolerance of private acts. The court noted that the article was published at a time when the inclusion of sexual orientation as a ground for anti-discrimination protection was still being debated, and that Cameron's argument did not apply when the judgment had already found the discrimination to be unconstitutional on the grounds of equality and dignity.

Having found that the sodomy laws breached constitutional rights, the court then proceeded to ask whether the infringement was justifiable "in an open and democratic society based on human dignity, equality and freedom". The court found that, on the one hand, the criminalisation of sodomy had severe effects on the lives of gay men, and, on the other hand, that no valid purpose had been suggested for the infringement. It pointed out that religious views could not influence constitutional jurisprudence in a secular country.

The court also examined the situation in other democratic countries, observing that sodomy had been decriminalised in the United Kingdom, Ireland, Germany, Australia, New Zealand and Canada, and throughout Western Europe. The court did take note that Bowers v. Hardwick was still (at that time) law in the United States, but pointed out its inconsistency with Romer v. Evans. The result of the balancing test was that the infringements of the rights of gay men could in no way be justified in an open and democratic society.

The court noted that male rape could be prosecuted as indecent assault, and that the Sexual Offences Act created a separate statutory offence criminalising same-sex sexual acts with a person under the age of 19. There was therefore no need to retain a limited offence of sodomy to deal with non-consensual or underage sex, and it could be entirely struck out of the common law. Considering the "men at a party" offence, the court described it as "absurdly discriminatory" and declared it to be unconstitutional for the same reasons that the offence of sodomy was.

The final question before the court was the exact nature of the order to be made and, in particular, to what extent it should be retroactive. The court ruled that, in law, the offences in question ceased to exist on 27 April 1994, when the Interim Constitution came into force. The order, however, provided that past convictions should only be invalidated if they were for consensual acts and the case had not been completely finalised; the court pointed out that those whose cases were final could apply for leave to appeal and condonation of their delay in appealing, in light of the judgment. The order also provided that actions taken as a result of the inclusion of sodomy in the schedules to the Criminal Procedure Act and the Security Officers Act should not be invalidated unless a court found that it would be just and equitable to do so.

== Subsequent events ==
The judgment was the first by the Constitutional Court to deal with LGBT rights. It was followed by a series of rulings relating to the recognition of same-sex relationships which granted, amongst others, immigration benefits, the ability to adopt, medical and pension benefits, rights related to artificial insemination, and intestate inheritance rights. This trend was completed by the ruling in Minister of Home Affairs v Fourie, which led to the Civil Union Act and the legalisation of same-sex marriage.

The court's ruling on the sodomy laws did not address the inequality in the Sexual Offences Act, which set the age of consent at 16 for heterosexual sex but 19 for homosexual sex. This discrepancy was addressed in 2007 by the Criminal Law (Sexual Offences and Related Matters) Amendment Act, which reformed and codified the law relating to sexual offences to place it on a gender- and orientation-neutral basis, setting a uniform age of consent at 16. The erstwhile discrepancy was declared to be unconstitutional in 2008, in the case of Geldenhuys v National Director of Public Prosecutions.

== See also ==
- LGBT rights in South Africa

Similar cases:

- Dudgeon v United Kingdom (1981), Norris v. Ireland (1988) and Modinos v. Cyprus (1993), decided by the European Court of Human Rights.
- Toonen v. Australia (1994), decided by the United Nations Human Rights Committee.
- Case No. 111-97-TC (1997), decided by the Constitutional Tribunal of Ecuador.
- Lawrence v. Texas (2003), decided by the United States Supreme Court.
- Thomas McCosker v The State (2005), decided by the High Court of Fiji.
- Naz Foundation v. Govt. of NCT of Delhi (2009), decided by the Delhi High Court.
