= J and B v Director General, Department of Home Affairs =

South African legal case

J v Director General, Department of Home Affairs
- Court: Constitutional Court of South Africa
- Full case name: J and B v Director-General, Department of Home Affairs and Others
- Decided: 28 March 2003
- Citations: [2003] ZACC 3, 2003 (5) BCLR 463, 2003 (5) SA 621 (CC)

Case history
- Appealed from: Durban and Coast Local Division

Court membership
- Judges sitting: Chaskalson CJ, Langa DCJ, Ackermann, Goldstone, Madala, Mokgoro, Moseneke, O'Regan & Yacoob JJ

Case opinions
- Decision by: Justice Goldstone

J and B v Director-General, Department of Home Affairs and Others is a 2003 decision of the Constitutional Court of South Africa which dealt with the situation of children born via artificial insemination to a lesbian couple in a permanent life-partnership. The court ruled that the partner who was not the biological parent was to be regarded as a natural parent and guardian and that the children were legitimate in law, and ordered the Department of Home Affairs to register both partners as parents on the children's birth certificates.
