= Leon de Beer =

South African politician

Leon de Beer MP

Member of Parliament for Hillbrow
- In office 1987–1989
- Preceded by: Alf Widman
- Succeeded by: Lester Fuchs

Personal details
- Born: 1959
- Died: 10 June 2016 (age 57) Bloemfontein, Free State
- Party: National Party

Leon de Beer was a South African politician who served as a member of the South African Parliament from 1987 to 1989. His election was notable because he was the first candidate in the country to appeal to gay voters.

== Political career ==
De Beer's 1987 campaign ran advertisements in the gay publication Exit and received a great deal of press as a result of his support for the gay community. His election was controversial not only because he supported the gay community, but because he was a member of the ruling National Party, which was responsible for both apartheid and previously enacted anti-sodomy laws. His campaign promise was twofold: to advance gay rights in the South African political arena and to reinstate Hillbrow as a whites-only area. De Beer ultimately won the election and ousted the Progressive Federal Party incumbent Alf Widman, a victory largely attributed to the white gay community of Hillbrow.

In 1988, de Beer, along with several other politicians, was charged with electoral fraud and he resigned in January 1989. He was convicted and was given a two-year prison sentence, of which he served eight months.

After release, he served briefly on the African National Congress's south Free State regional executive in the 1990s and attempted to apply to stand as a candidate for the Democratic Party but was turned down. He also worked as a director for the Anglo-Boer War Foundation, which became a source of controversy after his previous conviction became known to the Foundation's organizers.

Leon de Beer died in June 2016 in Bloemfontein.
