= Prevention and Combating of Hate Crimes and Hate Speech Act, 2023 =

South African legislation

Parliament of South Africa
- Long title: To give effect to the Republic’s obligations in terms of the Constitution and international human rights instruments concerning racism, racial discrimination, xenophobia and related intolerance, in accordance with international law obligations; to provide for offences as hate crimes and the offence of hate speech and the prosecution of persons who commit those offences; to provide for appropriate sentences that may be imposed on persons who commit hate crime and hate speech offences; to provide for the prevention of hate crimes and hate speech; to provide for the reporting on the implementation, application and administration of this Act; to effect consequential amendments to certain Acts of Parliament; and to provide for matters connected therewith.
- Citation: Prevention and Combating of Hate Crimes and Hate Speech Act of 2023 (Act 16 of 2023) (PDF).
- Enacted by: Parliament of South Africa
- Assented to: May 6, 2024; 17 months ago
- Status: Not yet in force

The Prevention and Combating of Hate Crimes and Hate Speech Act of 2023 (Act 16 of 2023) is a South African statute law aimed at reducing offensive speech and curbing hate crimes in South Africa. The Bill was introduced in 2016 and sat before the South African National Assembly until it was passed in 2023 and signed into law in 2024. Some of the stated intentions of the legislation include to "provide for the prevention of hate crimes and hate speech" and to "provide for effective enforcement measures" against those who express their "prejudice or intolerance towards the victim." The law has been subject to much debate, with some groups expressing concern over the implications of restricting speech. Others have contended that the law is necessary given the level of discrimination in South Africa and the decades-long Apartheid years before 1994.

The bill was signed into law by President Cyril Ramaphosa on 9 May 2024 and was gazetted on 14 May 2024. However, the Act is not yet in force.

== Background ==
Even after the end of the Apartheid era, South Africa has struggled with racial divisions, discrimination, and violence. Although the elimination of Apartheid ushered in majority election voting and eliminated widespread voting discrimination, South Africa nevertheless is home to much prejudice. An aspect of South African inequality is evident in the disproportionately high rate of poverty among the black population, despite the black population consisting of the ruling majority. One specific legislative effort aimed to correct such inequality occurred in 1994, when the government led by the ANC enacted the Restitution of Land Rights Act designed to redistribute land back to certain black populations that was taken during the colonial era. As South Africa continues to deal with the issues consequent of the Apartheid legacy, other proposed solutions have been to pass legislation, such as the Hate Crimes and Hate Speech Bill, to uphold South Africa's Constitutional ban on racism and commitment to equality.

== Summary ==
=== Preface ===
The Constitution of the Republic of South Africa allows for the freedom of expression with certain exceptions, one which prohibits the "advocacy of hatred that is based on race, ethnicity, gender or religion, and that constitutes incitement to cause harm." This exclusion is one of many considerations noted in the preamble of The Prevention and Combating of Hate Crimes and Hate Speech Bill. The Act begins by defining certain key terms found within the text and proceeds to detail the purpose of the Act as follows:

- give effect to the Republic’s obligations regarding prejudice and intolerance as contemplated in international instruments;
- provide for the prosecution of persons who commit offences referred to in this Act and provide for appropriate sentences;
- provide for the prevention of hate crimes and hate speech;
- provide for effective enforcement measures;
- provide for the co-ordinated implementation, application and administration of this Act;
- combat the commission of hate crimes and hate speech in a co-ordinated manner; and
- gather and record data on hate crimes and hate speech.

=== Hate crimes and hate speech ===
The act then explains what characteristics of an offence constitute a hate crime, as follows:

1. age;
2. albinism;
3. birth;
4. colour;
5. culture;
6. disability;
7. ethnic or social origin;
8. gender or gender identity;
9. HIV status;
10. language;
11. nationality, migrant or refugee status;
12. occupation or trade;
13. political affiliation or conviction;
14. race;
15. religion;
16. sex, which includes intersex; or
17. sexual orientation.

Hate speech, according to the act, is an offence directed at any of the aforementioned characteristics, excluding 12 and 13.

=== Exemptions ===
Although no exemptions exist for hate crimes, there are several exemptions regarding hate speech within the bill. The fifteen characteristics that constitute hate speech do not apply "if it is done in good faith in the course of engagement in—"

1. any bona fide artistic creativity, performance or other form of expression, to the extent that such creativity, performance or expression does not advocate hatred that constitutes incitement to cause harm;
2. any academic or scientific inquiry;
3. fair and accurate reporting or commentary in the public interest or in the publication of any information, commentary, advertisement or notice, in accordance with section 16(1) of the Constitution of the Republic of South Africa, 1996; or
4. the bona fide interpretation and proselytising or espousing of any religious tenet, belief, teaching, doctrine or writings, to the extent that such interpretation and proselytisation does not advocate hatred that constitutes incitement to cause harm.

=== Prevention of hate crimes and hate speech ===
One of the final sections of the bill stipulates that programs must be developed in order to:

1. conduct education and information campaigns to inform the public about the prohibition against hate crimes and hate speech, aimed at the prevention and combating of these offences;

2. ensure that all public officials who may be involved in the investigation and prosecution of hate crimes and hate speech are educated and informed of the prohibition against these offences;

3. provide assistance and advice to any person who wants to lodge a complaint of a hate crime or hate speech; and

4. train public officials on the prohibition, prevention and combating of hate crimes and hate speech, which training must include social context training.

== Reception ==
=== Support ===
Arguments in favour of the bill tend to align with broader arguments that support limiting hate speech in general, including the belief that the harms associated with certain speech warrant censorship, that unfettered speech propagates discrimination, and that freedom of speech should not be used to protect this discrimination. South African Committee Chairperson Mathole Motshekga stated that the bill is intended to address increasing intolerance and to allow assistance to the victims of the crimes. Deputy Minister of Justice John Jeffery noted that South Africa is not unique in its consideration of a Hate Speech bill and that in South Africa, there is no "absolute right" to freedom of expression in place, although a balance between censorship and speech is needed.

=== Opposition ===
Arguments against the bill also tend to align with broader arguments that oppose limiting free speech, including the belief that laws restricting hate speech invariably curb free discourse. Human Rights Watch has expressed concern over the bill's language and potential to lead to significant restrictions on freedom of expression. The Helen Suzman Foundation, a South African think-tank dedicated to promoting "liberal constitutional democracy," submitted a response outlining a list of reasons why the group fundamentally opposed the bill. The South African Institute on Race Relations also submitted a response opposing the bill, criticizing John Jeffery by stating that "hate speech laws in Australia, Canada, and Kenya are very different" and also warning that "double standards will apply in the enforcement of both the hate speech and hate crimes provisions."
