= Section 20A =

South African law criminalising some acts of sex between men

Section 20A of the Immorality Act, 1957, (Note: In 1988 the Immorality Act was renamed the Sexual Offences Act.) commonly known as the "men at a party" clause, was a South African law that criminalised all sexual acts between men that occurred in the presence of a third person. The section was enacted by the Immorality Amendment Act, 1969 and remained in force until it was found to be unconstitutional in 1998 by the Constitutional Court in the case of National Coalition for Gay and Lesbian Equality v Minister of Justice.

== Former law ==
The text of the clause was the following:

"Acts committed between men at a party and which are calculated to stimulate sexual passion or to give sexual gratification, prohibited.

20A. (1) A male person who commits with another male person at a party an act which is calculated to stimulate sexual passion or to give sexual gratification, shall be guilty of an offence.

(2) For the purposes of subsection (1) 'a party' means any occasion where more than two persons are present.

(3) The provisions of subsection (1) do not derogate from the common law, any other provision of this Act or a provision of any other law."

The prescribed penalty was a fine of up to R4000 or imprisonment for up to two years or both.

== History ==
"Sodomy" and "unnatural sexual acts" were offences in the Roman-Dutch common law of South Africa. These offences criminalised, inter alia, anal sex, oral sex, intercrural sex and mutual masturbation between men, but did not apply to, for example, men merely touching or kissing each other. In January 1966 the police raided a gay party, at which about 300 men were present, in the Forest Town suburb of Johannesburg. This, and a number of subsequent raids on parties and clubs in various cities, led to a moral panic. Homosexuality (particularly male homosexuality) was unacceptable in the Afrikaner Calvinist ethos of the apartheid regime, and Parliament reacted by convening a Select Committee which, in 1968, proposed a number of amendments to the Immorality Act. One of these was the "men at a party" clause, which was consequently enacted in 1969.

In one notable case in 1987, a conviction under the section was reversed on appeal by the Supreme Court because the court ruled that "a party" was not created when a police officer entered a room in a gay bathhouse because the two men in the room jumped apart when he switched on the light.

=== Challenge and removal ===
The Interim Constitution adopted in 1994 after the end of the apartheid regime, and the final Constitution which replaced it in 1997, both prohibited discrimination on the basis of sex, gender or sexual orientation. In 1997 the National Coalition for Gay and Lesbian Equality launched a constitutional challenge in the Witwatersrand Local Division of the High Court, asserting that the laws against "sodomy" and "unnatural sexual acts" as well as the "men at a party" clause infringed the equality clause of the Constitution. The government did not oppose the application, and in May 1998 Judge Heher handed down a judgment and order striking down the impugned laws.

The South African constitution requires orders striking down acts of parliament to be referred to the Constitutional Court for confirmation. The confirmation case was presented in August 1998, and in October the court issued a unanimous judgment confirming Judge Heher's order. Writing for the court, Justice Lourens Ackermann described Section 20A as having an "absurdly discriminatory purpose and impact," and stated that, "There is nothing before us to show that the provision was motivated by anything other than rank prejudice."

Although it was already unenforceable because of the Constitutional Court's order, section 20A was formally removed from the statute-book by the Criminal Law (Sexual Offences and Related Matters) Amendment Act, 2007.
