= Zakhele Mbhele =

South African politician

Zakhele Mbhele (born 9 November 1984) is a South African politician. A Member of Parliament of the Democratic Alliance in the National Assembly, Mbhele served as Media Liaison Officer for Western Cape Premier Helen Zille from November 2011 to May 2014. In the 2014 general election, Mbhele was elected to parliament and served till 2024.

== Personal life and education ==
Mbhele is gay, making him the first openly gay Black member of parliament. While attending University of Witwatersrand, he led ACTIVATE, the university’s LGBT campus group, and later served on the board of Joburg Pride. He was cited by the Mail & Guardian as one of "Top 200 Young South Africans" for his Civil Society work in 2010.
