= Alteration of Sex Description and Sex Status Act, 2003 =

South African law

Parliament of South Africa
- Citation: Act No. 49 of 2003
- Enacted by: Parliament of South Africa
- Assented to: 9 March 2004
- Commenced: 15 March 2004
- Introduced by: Mangosuthu Buthelezi, Minister of Home Affairs

Keywords
- gender identity, transsexualism, intersex
- Status: In force

The Alteration of Sex Description and Sex Status Act, 2003 (Act No. 49 of 2003) is a South African Act of Parliament which allows a person to change, under certain conditions, their sex recorded in the population registry.

Under the act, three types of people may apply to the Department of Home Affairs for a change of the sex description in their birth record: people who have undergone surgical or medical sex reassignment, people whose sexual characteristics have evolved naturally, and intersex people. The applicant must submit medical reports describing their situation; in the case of intersex people they must also submit a psychological report stating that they have lived for two years with their chosen gender identity.

If the application is refused, it may be appealed to the Minister of Home Affairs, and if the appeal is refused the decision may be challenged in the Magistrate's Court. Once an application is approved the Department will issue a new birth certificate and identity document. The change in sex is valid for all purposes, but does not affect any rights or obligations the person had before it occurred.

The law was criticised by the Cape Town Transsexual/Transgender Support Group because it requires medical or surgical treatment before a change can be registered. Conversely, the African Christian Democratic Party (ACDP) objected to the act based on the belief that sex is biologically determined at birth. The ACDP and National Action were the only parties to vote against the bill in the National Assembly.

In 2013 it was reported, in response to a question in Parliament, that 95 people had legally changed their gender under the law. It was also reported that problems have been encountered by applicants because officials are not consistent in their interpretation of the medical requirements.
