= Minister of Home Affairs v Fourie =

South African legal case

- Court: Constitutional Court of South Africa
- Full case name: Minister of Home Affairs and Another v Fourie and Another (Doctors for Life International and Others, amici curiae); Lesbian and Gay Equality Project and Others v Minister of Home Affairs and Others
- Decided: 1 December 2005
- Citations: [2005] ZACC 19, 2006 (1) SA 524 (CC), 2006 (3) BCLR 355 (CC)

Case history
- Prior actions: [2002] ZAGPHC 1 (18 October 2002), Transvaal Provincial Division; [2003] ZACC 11 (31 July 2003), Constitutional Court (application for direct access denied); [2004] ZASCA 132 (30 November 2004), Supreme Court of Appeal

Court membership
- Judges sitting: Langa CJ, Moseneke DCJ, Mokgoro, Ngcobo, O'Regan, Sachs, Skweyiya, van der Westhuizen & Yacoob JJ

Case opinions
- The common-law definition of marriage and section 30(1) of the Marriage Act are inconsistent with the Constitution, and therefore invalid, to the extent that they do not allow to same-sex couples the status and benefits of marriage allowed to opposite-sex couples. (Unanimous.) The declaration of invalidity is suspended for twelve months to allow Parliament to correct the defects. (8:1, O'Regan dissenting.)
- Decision by: Justice Sachs

Keywords
- LGBT rights, same-sex marriage, Husband, Wife, Marriage, Common law, Parliament, Constitutional law, Human rights, Fundamental rights, Diversity, Pluralism, Society, Majoritarianim, Equality, Equality before the law, Discrimination, Sexual orientation, Unfair discrimination, Human dignity, Development of common law, Interpretation, Religion

Minister of Home Affairs and Another v Fourie and Another; Lesbian and Gay Equality Project and Others v Minister of Home Affairs and Others, [2005] ZACC 19, is a landmark decision of the Constitutional Court of South Africa in which the court ruled unanimously that same-sex couples have a constitutional right to marry. The judgment, authored by Justice Albie Sachs and delivered on 1 December 2005, gave Parliament one year to pass the necessary legislation. As a result, the Civil Union Act came into force on 30 November 2006, making South Africa the fifth country in the world to recognise same-sex marriage.

The case was heard on May 17, 2005, by Langa ACJ, Madala J, Mokgoro J, Moseneke J, Ngcobo J, O'Regan J, Sachs J, Skweyiya J, Yacoob J and Van Der Westhuizen J. MTK Moerane SC (with S. Nthai) appeared for the applicants, P Oosthuizen (with T Kathri) for the respondents, JJ Smyth QC for the first and second amici curiae, GC Pretorius SC (with DM Achtzehn, PG Seleka and JR Bauer) for the third amicus curiae, DI Berger SC (with Fayeeza Kathree) for the applicants, and M Donen SC for the respondents. In the Fourie case, the applicants' counsel was instructed by the State Attorney, and the respondents' by M. van den Berg. The third amicus curiae was instructed by Motla Conradie. In the Lesbian and Gay Equality Project case, the applicants' counsel was instructed by Nicholls, Cambanis & Associates, and the respondents' by the State Attorney.

The case concerned applications for leave to appeal and cross-appeal against a decision of the Supreme Court of Appeal (the Fourie case) coupled with an application for direct access to the Constitutional Court (the Lesbian and Gay Equality Project case).

== Legal background ==
The definition of marriage in South African common law is drawn from the Roman-Dutch law, and until the Fourie case it was described as "a union of one man with one woman, to the exclusion, while it lasts, of all others". This definition excluded same-sex unions; it also excluded polygamous or potentially polygamous unions like Muslim marriages and marriages under African customary law.

The Marriage Act, the statute which regulates the formalities of the marriage ceremony, does not make any explicit mention of the genders of the spouses. However, section 30(1) of the act (as substituted by the Marriage Amendment Act, 1973) requires the marriage officer to ask each party to the marriage:

"Do you, A.B., declare that as far as you know there is no lawful impediment to your proposed marriage with C.D. here present, and that you call all here present to witness that you take C.D. as your lawful wife (or husband)?" and thereupon the parties shall give each other the right hand and the marriage officer concerned shall declare the marriage solemnized in the following words: "I declare that A B and C D here present have been lawfully married.

The courts understood the use words "wife (or husband)" to require that the spouses must be a man and a woman.

The Interim Constitution which came into force in April 1994, and the final Constitution which replaced it in February 1997, both prohibit unfair discrimination on the basis of sexual orientation. Section 9 of the final Constitution provides as follows:

(1) Everyone is equal before the law and has the right to equal protection and benefit of the law.

(2) Equality includes the full and equal enjoyment of all rights and freedoms.

(3) The State may not unfairly discriminate directly or indirectly against anyone on one or more grounds, including race, gender, sex, pregnancy, marital status, ethnic or social origin, colour, sexual orientation, age, disability, religion, conscience, belief, culture, language and birth.

(4) No person may unfairly discriminate against anyone on one or more grounds in terms of ss (3).

Section 10 of the Constitution provides that "everyone has inherent dignity and the right to have their dignity respected and protected."

== Facts ==
The applicants were Ms Marié Adriaana Fourie and Ms Cecelia Johanna Bonthuys, a lesbian couple that wished to marry. Prior to the hearing, applications were made by Doctors For Life International and its legal representative Mr John Smyth, to be admitted as amici curiae. Application to be admitted as amicus curiae was also made by the Marriage Alliance of South Africa, supported on affidavit by Cardinal Wilfred Napier.

== Judgment ==
The nine judges hearing the case agreed unanimously that same-sex couples were entitled to marry, accordingly declared the common-law definition of marriage to be inconsistent with the Constitution and invalid to the extent that it did not permit same-sex couples to enjoy the status and the benefits coupled with responsibilities it accorded to heterosexual couples. They disagreed as to the remedy. The majority suspended the declaration of invalidity for a period of a year to allow Parliament time to correct the defect. It also declared the omission from section 30(1) of the Marriage Act after the words "or husband" of the words "or spouse" to be inconsistent with the Constitution, and invalid to the extent of the inconsistency. Again, the declaration of invalidity was suspended for a year to allow Parliament time to correct the defect. Justice Kate O'Regan, the lone dissenter in part, thought the statute should be altered immediately.

The court's finding was based on section 9 of the Constitution of South Africa, particularly on the right to equal protection and benefit of the law in section 9(1) and the explicit prohibition on discrimination, including on the basis of sexual orientation, in section 9(3). The common law and section 30(1) of the Marriage Act denied same-sex couples equal protection and benefit of the law, in conflict with section 9(1) of the Constitution, and taken together resulted in same-sex couples being subjected to unfair discrimination by the State, in conflict with section 9(3) of the Constitution. When evaluated in the context of the legal regime as a whole, the common-law definition of marriage and section 30(1) of the Marriage Act were under-inclusive, Sachs found, and unconstitutional to the extent that they made no appropriate provision for gay and lesbian people to celebrate their unions in the same way that they enabled heterosexual couples to do. This violation of the equality and dignity rights of same-sex couples was not justified as contemplated in section 36 of the Constitution.

The failure of the common law and the Marriage Act to provide the means whereby same-sex couples could enjoy the same status, entitlements and responsibilities accorded to heterosexual couples through marriage accordingly constituted an unjustifiable violation of their right to equal protection of the law under section 9(1), and not to be discriminated against unfairly in terms of s 9(3) of the Constitution. Furthermore, such failure represented an unjustifiable violation of their right to dignity in terms of section 10 of the Constitution.

It is one thing, Sachs wrote, for the Constitutional Court to acknowledge the important role that religion plays in public life; it is quite another for it to use religious doctrine as a source for interpreting the Constitution. It would be out of order to employ the religious sentiments of some as a guide to the constitutional rights of others. Judges would be placed in an intolerable situation if they were called upon to construe religious texts and take sides on issues that have caused deep schisms within religious bodies.

The Constitution, Sachs continued, contains a number of provisions that underline the constitutional value of acknowledging diversity and pluralism in South African society, and give a particular texture to the broadly-phrased right to freedom of association contained in section 18. Taken together, they affirm the right of people to self-expression without being forced to subordinate themselves to the cultural and religious norms of others, and highlight the importance of individuals and communities being able to enjoy what has been called the "right to be different." In each case, space has been found for members of communities to depart from a majoritarian norm.

The court noted that South Africa has a multitude of family formations that are evolving rapidly as society develops, so that it is inappropriate to entrench any particular form as the only socially and legally acceptable one. There is an imperative constitutional need to acknowledge the long history in South Africa and abroad of marginalisation and persecution of gays and lesbians, although a number of breakthroughs have been made in particular areas. The court also found that there is no comprehensive legal regulation of the family law rights of gays and lesbians, and that the Constitution represents a radical rupture with a past based on intolerance and exclusion, and the movement forward to the acceptance of the need to develop a society based on equality and respect by all for all. The Court pointed out that what was at issue was the need to affirm the character of the society as one based on tolerance and mutual respect.

== See also ==
- Same-sex marriage in South Africa
- LGBT rights in South Africa
- National Coalition for Gay and Lesbian Equality and Another v. Minister of Justice and Others (1998), another case decided by the Constitutional Court of South Africa which decriminalized homosexual acts.
