= Lesbian and Gay Equality Project =

Lesbian/Gay Equality for South Africa Action

LGEP
- Lesbian and Gay Equality Project
- Founded: 1994
- Founder: Zackie Achmat
- Founded at: South Africa
- Website: https://gaysouthafrica.org.za/ncgle/default.asp
- Formerly called: National Coalition for Gay and Lesbian Equality (NCGLE)

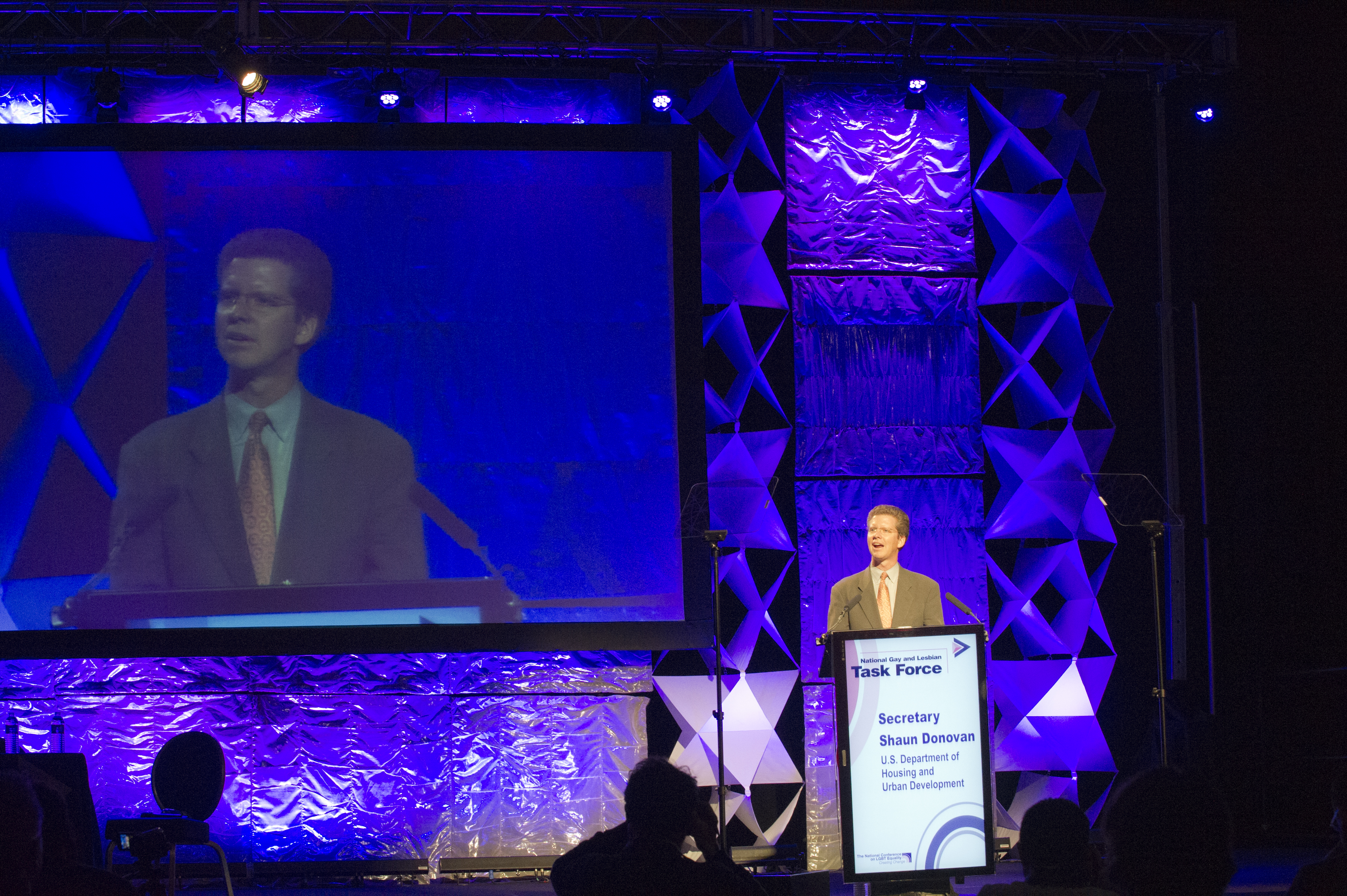
National Gay and Lesbian Task Force meeting- -The National Conference on Lesbian, Gay, Bisexual, Transgender (LGBT) Equality--Creating Change, Baltimore, Maryland, with addresses by Secretary Shaun Donovan, Tas(...) - NARA

The Lesbian and Gay Equality Project (LGEP), formerly known as the National Coalition for Gay and Lesbian Equality (NCGLE), is a non-profit, non-governmental organization in South Africa that focuses on the expansion of LGBT civil rights in South Africa and other countries in sub-Saharan Africa. It was co-founded by Zackie Achmat in 1994, and successfully lobbied for the inclusion of sexual orientation as a basis for non-discrimination laws in the country after the end of the apartheid period. The organization has continued to operate after South Africa officially legalized same-sex marriage in 2005. Its work includes "law reform, lobbying, litigation, advocacy, employment equity, leadership training and development."

== Overview ==
The late South African activist Simon Nkoli was a member of the executive committee of the NCGLE upon its formation in 1994, and was a key figure in the organization's successful campaign to include sexual orientation in post-apartheid South Africa's constitutional equality clause. As a result of this lobbying effort, South Africa became the first country in the world to constitutionally cement the rights of homosexuals, and the NCGLE could lay claim to successfully including gay and lesbian issues in South Africa's liberation struggle. After securing further rights gains through the legislature and in the courts throughout the 1990s, the NCGLE ceased to function as a coalition of member organizations and became a freestanding non-governmental organization, the LGEP, in 1999. The NCGLE was one of the most prominent gay and lesbian organization in South Africa for more than a decade.

One of the foremost concerns of the organization is the continued homophobia that is present in post-apartheid society, and it is also in solidarity with LGBT organizations in Zimbabwe, where the Mugabe regime has placed severe restrictions on the living rights of the LGBT minority and other citizens.

The LGEP was a litigant in a number of South African court cases related to LGBT rights:

- National Coalition for Gay and Lesbian Equality and Another v Minister of Justice and Others (decriminalisation of sodomy)
- National Coalition for Gay and Lesbian Equality and Others v Minister of Home Affairs and Others (immigration equality)
- Minister of Home Affairs and Another v Fourie and Another; Lesbian and Gay Equality Project and Others v Minister of Home Affairs and Others (marriage equality)
