= Peter Busse =

South African AIDS activist (1958 to 2006)

Peter Graham Busse
- Born: February 13, 1958; East London, South Africa
- Died: January 6, 2006 (aged 47); Johannesburg
- Education: University of Cape Town
- Occupations: AIDS activist and educator
- Organization(s): Township AIDS Project, National Association of People Living with HIV/AIDS
- Known for: One of the first South Africans to disclose their HIV positive status

Peter Busse (1958-2006) was a South African AIDS activist. After his diagnosis in 1985, he became involved in HIV/AIDS advocacy and education, including co-founding the Township AIDS Project (TAP) with Simon Nkoli. One of the first South Africans to publicly disclose their HIV-positive status, he also co-founded the National Association of People Living with HIV/AIDS (NAPWA). In his later years, he worked as a consultant and workshop facilitator for various NGOs and institutions.

== Biography ==
=== Early life and education ===
Peter Graham Busse was born on 13 February 1958 in East London. He had two brothers and was raised in Cape Town, where he attended Abbotts College for secondary school. Busse knew he was gay from a young age and began his first relationship at age 25. At the University of Cape Town, he studied to be a librarian. As a white South African during apartheid, he was required to serve in the South African Defense Force, but he left the country so he would not be conscripted. First he moved to the Netherlands and then to Swaziland, where he served as Chief Librarian for the National Library Service.

=== HIV diagnosis and activism (1987–1992) ===
In 1985, while living in Swaziland, Busse was diagnosed with HIV. His doctor did not provide him with counseling or education during his diagnosis; he later stated that this experience motivated him to become an HIV counselor to provide support to people who were newly diagnosed with HIV. Busse moved back to South Africa, where he volunteered as an HIV counselor in Johannesburg. He co-founded the Township AIDS Project (TAP) with Simon Nkoli in 1989. TAP was a Soweto-based organization that provided HIV/AIDS education to the Black and LGBTQ communities. Busse was also a founding member of the Gay and Lesbian Organization of Witwatersrand (GLOW), a gay rights organization closely affiliated with TAP. GLOW launched South Africa's first gay pride parade in 1990, which Busse described as having an "incredible sense of excitement and of history in the making."

In the early 1990s, Busse became one of the first South Africans to publicly disclose their HIV-positive status. In 1991, during the pride march, a tree was planted at Pieter Roos Park in Johannesburg to honor people who had died of AIDS and those who were dealing with related illnesses. Busse spoke about living with HIV at the ceremony. At a 1992 National AIDS Committee of South Africa (NACOSA) meeting about creating a national AIDS policy, he surmised that nobody else in the room was HIV-positive. When it was his turn to introduce himself at the meeting he stated: "I’ve... been HIV positive since 1985 and I’m living with HIV. I’d like to bring that perspective into the writing of the National AIDS Plan."

=== National Association of People Living with HIV/AIDS (1994–1999) ===
Busse co-founded the National Association of People Living with HIV/AIDS (NAPWA) with Mercy Makhalemela in 1994 and later became director in 1997. NAPWA advocated and provided support services for people living with HIV/AIDS. In 1998, NAPWA launched the "Disclosure and Acceptance" campaign which aimed to help people disclose their positive HIV statuses and combat HIV stigma. At the time, Busse estimated that fewer than 100 South Africans were openly living with HIV. On World AIDS Day, NAPWA volunteer Gugu Dlamini disclosed her status on television and radio; she was murdered at her home by a mob later that month. Busse stated that Dlamini's death demonstrated the immense need to combat negative attitudes against people with HIV. Several years later, he pointed to issues with the campaign, including lack of planning and resources.

Along with other AIDS activists like Simon Nkoli, Busse assisted Kim Berman in launching an arts initiative called Paper Prayers. Paper Prayers ran printmaking workshops where participants created anonymous HIV-related messages and learned about HIV/AIDS. The messages were displayed in various art galleries and other venues on World AIDS Day and sold to raise money for HIV/AIDS organizations like TAP and NAPWA.

The Treatment Action Campaign (TAC), which aimed to increase access to HIV medication, was initially established as part of NAPWA in late 1998. TAC soon broke away from NAPWA because of disagreements about tactics; in particular, TAC wanted NAPWA to be more progressive and militant. Some NAPWA members challenged Busse's leadership, alleging mismanagement and racism, while Busse maintained that his detractors opposed him because he was white and gay. In 1999, Busse resigned as director of NAPWA and dealt with a series of illnesses.

=== Later life (2000–2006) ===
Busse then worked as an HIV/AIDS consultant to various NGOs and other institutions as well as a workshop facilitator and educator. HIV and Me, a workshop he created in 2002, centers the needs of people living with HIV and seeks to "personalize" HIV for participants. The workshop continued to be delivered after his death. Ibis released a short documentary about Busse delivering the workshop in Namibia. Busse also assisted in running International AIDS Society conferences, including their 2000 conference in Durban for which he co-chaired the Community Programme Committee with Clarence Mini.

To commemorate 20 years of living with AIDS, Busse held a "Celebration of Life" party in April 2005. He credited his survival to HIV medication, his optimism, and the support of his loved ones. Around 250 people attended. Busse died on 6 January 2006 in Johannesburg. His cremation and memorial service were held on 14 January in Johannesburg. Some of his friends believed that poor adherence to HIV medication contributed to his death. A collection of his photographs, letters, and other items is stored at GALA Queer Archive.

== Views ==
Busse believed that disclosing one's positive HIV status was important to minimize HIV/AIDS denial and to serve as a role model for others. He stated that it was necessary to work within communities to destigmatize HIV so that people would be supported after they disclosed their status. In an interview for a GALA Queer Archive anthology, he stated: "I don’t like presenting only parts of myself and having to hide away other parts. I am completely open and transparent." He compared disclosing his HIV status to coming out as a gay man.

Busse was known for his positive outlook on living with HIV, which inspired others dealing with an HIV diagnosis. In an interview, Busse said that using the word "victim" was stigmatizing; "We don’t want to just be seen as people with AIDS, we want the living component added, so it’s people living with HIV/AIDS." He later stated that: "Positive living in a very broad sense of the word is having hope and believing that HIV is not equal to AIDS and not equal to death." In Sue Williamson's From the Inside, a series of public artworks featuring statements from people living with AIDS, Busse's quote was included: "Being diagnosed HIV + can be a new beginning. You reassess what is important."

In the late 1990s, there was a debate about whether foreign drug companies should be allowed to conduct clinical trials for HIV medication in South Africa because most participants would not be able to access treatment after the trials ended. In a 1997 article in the British Medical Journal, Busse argued that people with AIDS should be able to make their own decisions about enrolling in trials and that "many people feel that access to limited and potentially beneficial treatment is better than no treatment at all".

== Selected works and media appearances ==
- Busse, Peter (1997-03-22). "Strident, but essential: the voices of people with AIDS". BMJ.
- Busse, Peter (February 2000). "Peter Busse". In LIVING OPENLY: Stories and images of HIV positive South Africans. Department of Health.
- Williamson, Sue (2002). From the Inside: Peter Busse.
- Busse, Peter (2003). "Love, Hope and Courage". In Men, HIV and AIDS. VSO-RAISA.
- Phiri, Leo (2004). Aids and Me. Mubasen Film & Video Productions. IBIS.
- Busse, Peter (2006). "There Was an Incredible Sense of Excitement and History in the Making". In Pride: Protest and Celebration.
