= Queer radicalism =

Action by queer groups for legal/social change

Queer radicalism can be defined as illegal or violent actions taken by queer groups which contribute to a change in laws and/or social norms. The key difference between queer radicalism and queer activism is that radicalism is often disruptive and commonly involves illegal action. Due to the nature of LGBTQ+ laws around the world, almost all queer activism that took place before the decriminalization of gay marriage can be considered radical action. The history of queer radicalism can be expressed through the many organizations and protests that contributed to a common cause of improving the rights and social acceptance of the LGBTQ+ community.

== Early queer organizations ==
Early queer organizations pre-Stonewall era are exemplary instances of queer radicalism and queer radicalist movements. Due to the criminalization and social stigmas surrounding homosexuality, any public LGBTQ+ organization from the early 1950s to the late 1960s is considered radical. Early queer organizations challenged past social conflicts and addressed human rights issues. These organizations have maintained a legacy and set precedence in current queer radicalist and activist movements.

=== The Mattachine Society ===
The Mattachine Society is considered the earliest gay rights organization in North America, founded after the establishment of the Mattachine Foundation. Founded in Los Angeles in 1951, the Mattachine Foundation consisted of a small group of young gay men formerly subscribed to the communist lifestyle. The Mattachine Foundation was curated on the principles of equal human rights and self-esteem among gay people. Within two years, the Mattachine Foundation expanded from Los Angeles to San Francisco. The Mattachine Society addressed multiple human rights issues, including homophobia and the concept of deviance in a heteronormative society.

=== Daughters of Bilitis ===
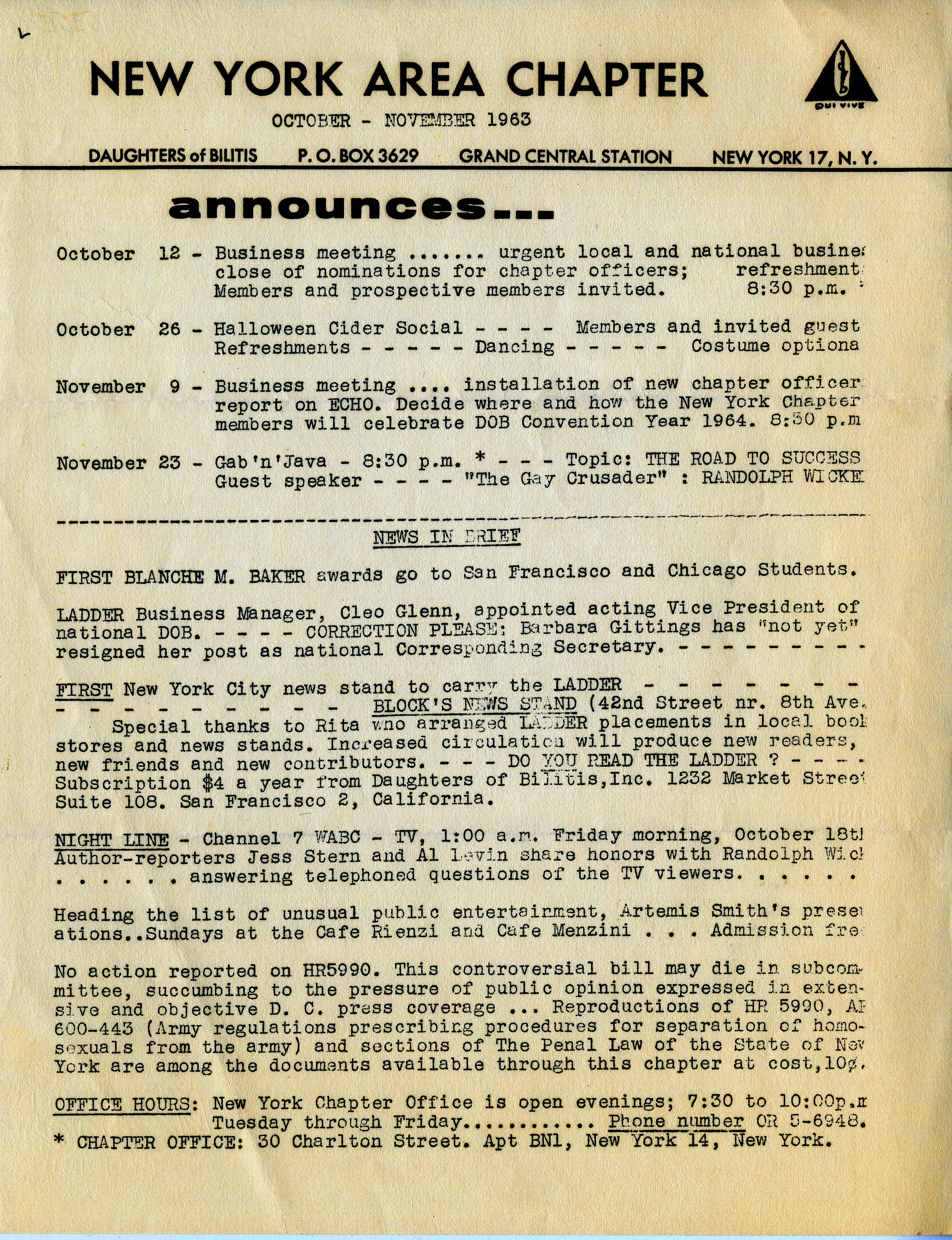
Daughters of Bilitis Newsletter, 1963

The Daughters of Bilitis was founded in California in 1955 by a lesbian couple, Del Martin and Phyllis Lyon. It was the first social and political organization for lesbian women in the United States. The Daughters of Bilitis would subtly provide a sense of community and support for lesbians, as well as host public discussions and conduct research around homosexuality. The organization did not provide any information to the general public and encouraged members to refrain from lesbian culture in a heteronormative society. This organization began in California; however, chapters arose in different cities around the United States.

During the 1960s and the first wave of radical feminism, the Daughters of Bilitis shifted from focusing on lesbian rights to women's rights. This ultimately led to its decline in the mid-1960s, as numerous women in the feminist movement were openly homophobic. While the organization was active for about a decade, it was a significant contributor to early queer radicalism. Its legacy is considered to be part of 21st-century queer radical movements.

=== Society for Human Rights ===
The Society for Human Rights was founded in New York City in 1924. It was founded by Henry Gerber who would invite members, notably young gay men, privately into his home, where the society would hold meetings. The Society for Human Rights served a sense of community for local gay men. It was an incredibly short-lived society, as police raided the home after members filed paperwork to the state to run as an organization. Police interference was due to the fact that the Society of Human Rights was publicly addressed and acknowledged as an LGBTQ+ organization. The Society for Human Rights is the first documented LGBTQ+ organization known publicly and a catalyst to queer radicalism in North America.

=== Homophile youth movement in neighbourhoods ===
The Homophile Youth Movement in Neighborhoods was a queer social movement that was active in the late 1960s. It was founded by Craig Rodwell, a young gay man in New York who was a member of the Mattachine Society at the time. The Homophile Youth Movement was based on the Oscar Wilde house on Mercer Street. The Oscar Wilde House was a place where youth could find literature exclusively about gays and lesbians. It also sold political merchandise for queer social and political movements. It was openly queer, as it had public displays of homosexuality in display windows. It was a building specifically designated for the Homophile Youth Movement.

The Homophile Youth Movement was shortly established before the monumental Stonewall Riots in New York City as a headquarters for gay youth to lead rallies and have a sense of community since homosexuality was illegal at the time and gay youth would be excluded due to the gay community mainly mingling in gay bars.

== Influence of Stonewall ==
The Stonewall riots are among some of the most notable radical queer actions from the past. These riots were a series of violent demonstrations carried out by members of the queer community toward the police after their raid on the Stonewall Inn (New York City) in 1969. They are often recognized as the biggest turning point of the LGBTQ+ rights movement.

In the United States at the time, homosexuality was still criminalized, causing discrimination and violence against people identifying as LGBTQ+. Queer spaces were hard to come by, and the Stonewall Inn was one of only a few. When police showed up the night of June 28, 1969, to make arrests relating to homosexuality, they were met with equal force from the patrons of the establishment. They refused to break up their gatherings, throwing various objects at the police. Thousands of people joined in the resistance for the next several nights in support of the LGBTQ+ community.

The Stonewall riots are often remembered as a turning point in LGBTQ+ activism. They not only encouraged political engagement within the queer community but were the inspiration for the creation of new LGBTQ+ rights organizations and advocacy groups.

== Post-Stonewall queer organizations ==
=== Gay Activists Alliance ===
The Gay Activists Alliance (GAA) was founded in December 1969, six months after the Stonewall riots in New York City. The GAA was founded by 19 members of the Gay Liberation Front (GLF) and grew into a radical queer, non-violent organization. The GAA specifically focused on the rights, freedoms, and liberty of gay people, with the demand for freedom of expression and dignity, as well as the recognition of being human. By the early 1970s, the GAA became the most influential gay liberation group, with its emphasis on non-violent confrontation.

=== Gay Liberation Front (GLF) ===
The Gay Liberation Front (GLF) was formed just one month after the Stonewall rebellion in New York City. The name GLF came from the Algerian National Liberation Front and the Vietnamese National Liberation Front. The GLF's most well-known actions include protesting coverage of LGBTQ+ people by the Village Voice in September 1969 and “Friday of the Purple Hand,” which was a protest outside the offices of the San Francisco Examiner that ended with Examiner employees pouring ink on the crowd.

=== Human Rights Campaign (HRC) ===
Human Rights Campaign (HRC) Logo

Human Rights Campaign (HRC) is an LGBTQ+ advocacy group based in the United States. It is also the largest LGBTQ+ political lobbying organization in the United States. The focus of the organization is to protect and expand the rights of LGBTQ+ people. The organization provides resources on coming out, transgender issues, LGBT-related healthcare topics, and information on workplace issues.

=== Lambda Legal Defense and Education Fund ===
Lambda Legal Defense and Education Fund is a United States civil rights organization that represents LGBTQ+ communities and people living with HIV in court and helps to change public opinion. They have played a role in several legal cases regarding gay rights, the most significant being the 2003 Lawrence v. Texas case that overturned sodomy laws in the United States.

=== Gay & Lesbian Alliance Against Defamation (GLAAD) ===
Gay & Lesbian Alliance Against Defamation (GLAAD) is the world's largest LGBTQ+ media advocacy organization. Founded in the United States, GLAAD was formed in 1985 and was originally created to protest against defamatory reporting of gay and lesbian demographics in the media.

=== National Centre for Transgender Equality (NCTE) ===
The National Center for Transgender Equality (NCTE) was created in 2003 by Mara Keisling, the then co-chair of the Pennsylvania Gender Rights Coalition with support from the National Gay and Lesbian Task Force. The organization is a nonprofit social equality organization that focuses mostly on policy advocacy and media activism to advance the equality of transgender people.

== AIDS crisis ==
Queer radicalism as a movement shows some of its roots in the United States in the 1980s in response to the AIDS epidemic. AIDS disproportionately affected members of the LGBTQ+ community, especially gay men. The response from the government was slow and deemed by many members of the queer community as inadequate. In addition, there was a stigma within society leading to discrimination against people living with HIV. This combination of factors led many queer radical activists into action with an increase in public demonstrations and civil disobedience in order to obtain the proper care and treatment of HIV patients and to restore dignity to those affected by the disease.

=== ACT UP ===
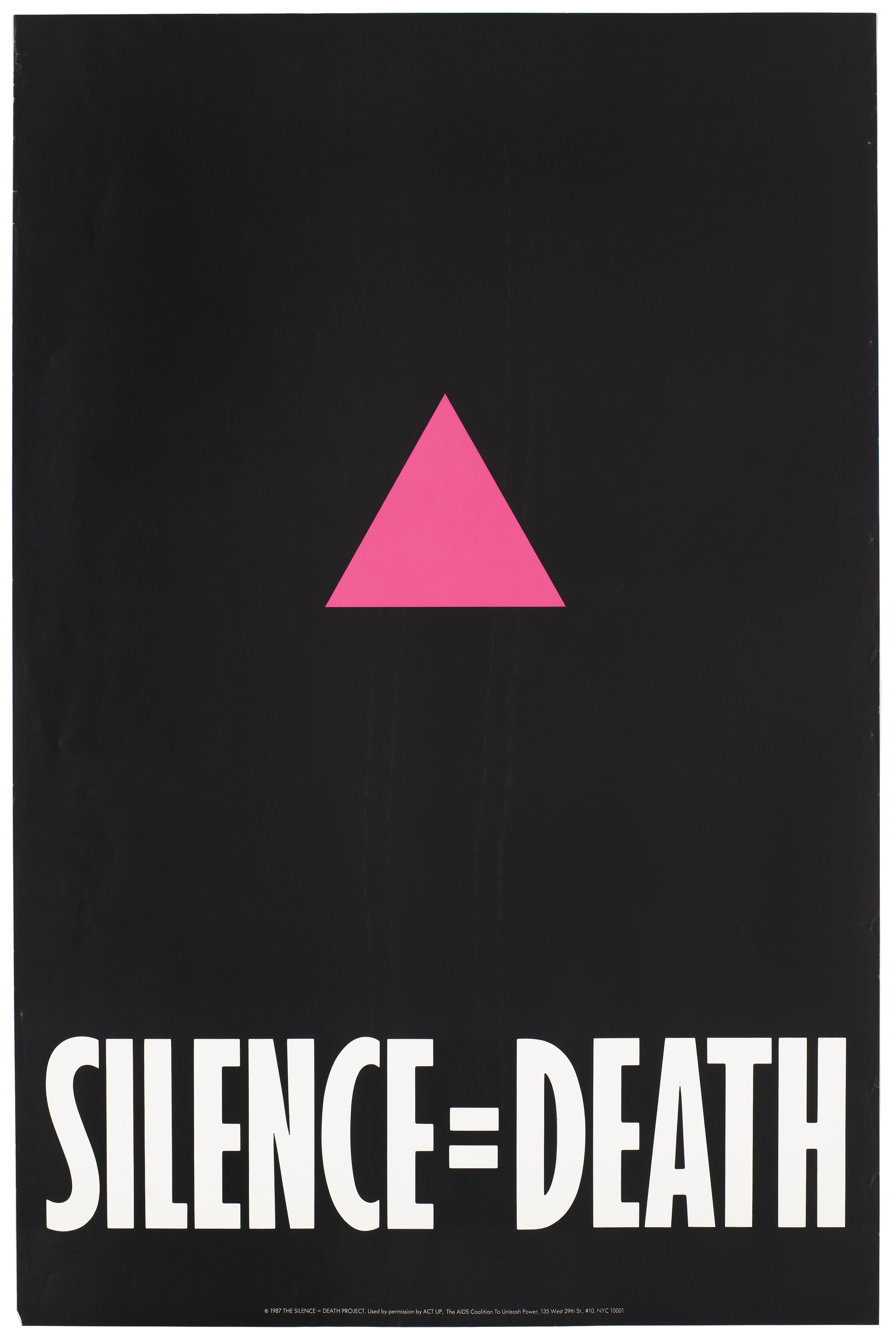
Advertisement used by ACT UP for The Silence = Death Project

ACT UP (AIDS Coalition to Unleash Power) was a radical organization that came about in the mid-1980s in response to the AIDS epidemic. The organization was initially a formation of a group of activists who were upset by the government's slow response to the crisis as well as the lack of funding for AIDS research. With the rapid increase in AIDS cases, the group believed that immediate direct action was the necessary force to bring about change.

ACT UP used many different tactics to raise AIDS awareness and demand direct action. Among some, they made an effort to organize protests and marches to draw attention to themselves and disrupt society, for example, the "Stop the Church" protest where participants interrupted a mass at St. Patrick's Cathedral in New York City. The group also engaged in civil disobedience, once occupying the Food and Drug Administration (FDA) headquarters to make their demand for faster approval of experimental drugs that would treat AIDS. In terms of media, ACT UP activists use different forms, including art, to raise awareness for AIDS and provide education to the public. This included the famous "Silence = Death" slogan and the pink triangle symbol that would become a symbol of queer resistance.

=== Queer Nation ===
The radical LGBTQ+ advocacy group Queer Nation first appeared after the AIDS crisis in the United States in the early 1990s due to the failure of more traditional gay rights organizations to fully serve the community's needs. Queer Nation aimed to organize and politicize communities to fight for LGBTQ+ rights, visibility, and power. The group demonstrated several radical strategies, such as public demonstrations, direct action, and even confrontational slogans and images. As an organization, they prioritized helping disadvantaged groups through an intersectional lens as well as supporting all marginalized communities within society. Queer Nation played a large role in aiding the visibility and acceptance of the queer community in the US and worldwide.

By their use of more confrontational methods, the organization pushed back against the harmful attitudes of mainstream society towards people of the LGBTQ+ community and helped to create an environment for more radical and authentic expressions of queer identity. Queer Nation's push for direct action and grassroots organizing redefined the political movement for gay rights and paved the way for upcoming queer activist groups to challenge mainstream power structures in effective ways.

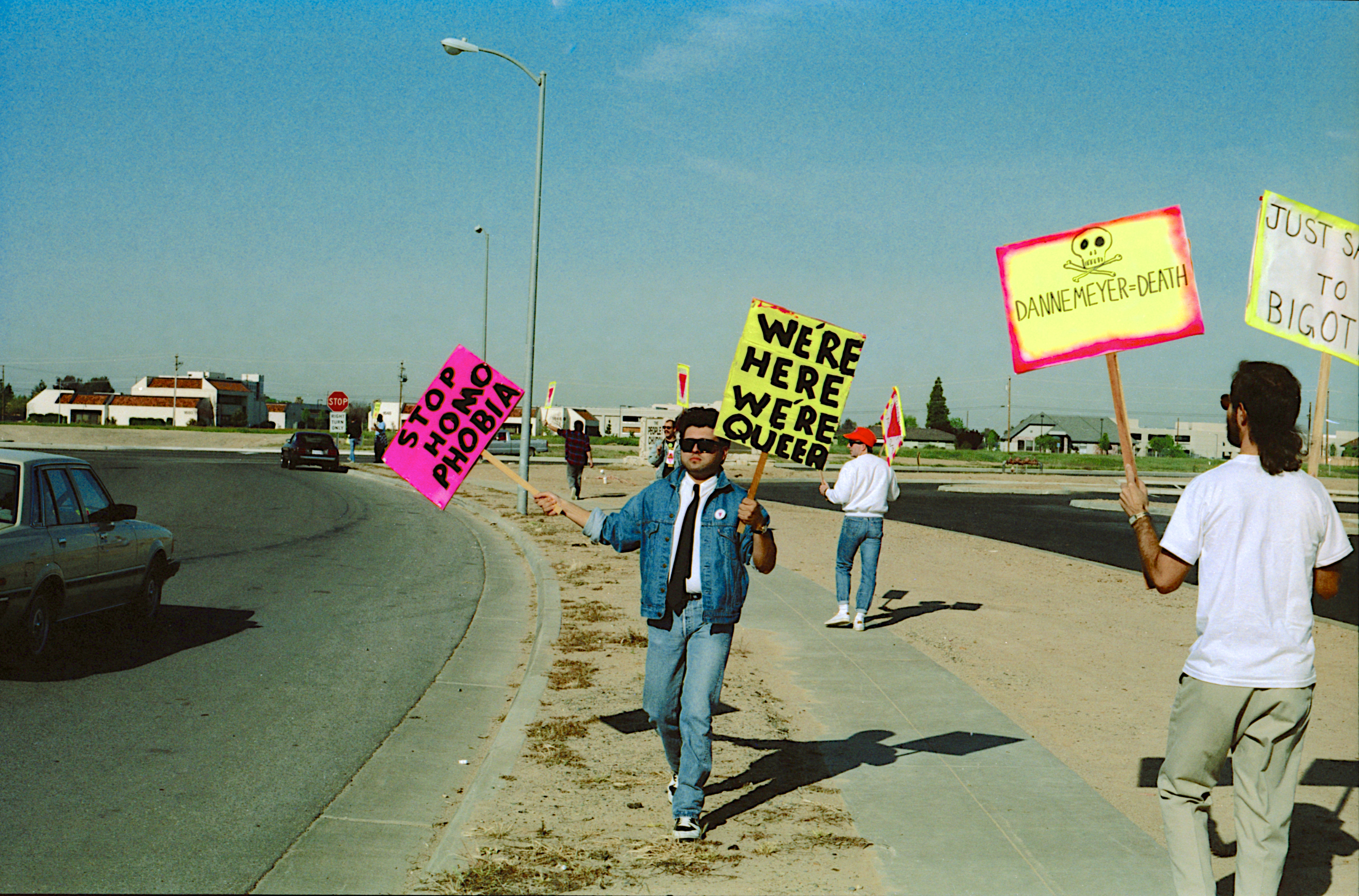
ACT UP Queer Nation demonstration in 1991 at Peoples Church against Concerned Women of America conference

Below are a few examples of early actions by Queer Nation:

- April 20, 1990: Demonstration at Macy's department store in protest of Wheaties cereal brand after pasting Greg Louganis’ photo on the front of their boxes. The brand had previously rejected the Olympic gold medalist because he was queer.
- April 26, 1990: Queer Nation hung a banner reading “Dykes and Fags Bash Back” on the roof of a New York City Bar in response to the ongoing violence against the LGBTQ+ community.
- June 16, 1990: Queer Nation organized and held a march attracting 1,500 people to fight back against queer violence. The March lasted 4 hours and took place across New York City.
- June 23, 1990: Queer Nation organized an illegal march in collaboration with ACT UP in New York City. The action was in protest to New York City Parks decision barring the gay and lesbian rally from happening in central park.
- August 3, 1990: A march on the Quebec Government House by Queer Nation is held in Manhattan to protest the violence of Montreal police towards queer individuals during their July pride celebration.

== LGBTQ rights around the world ==
=== Middle East ===
Queer radicalism in the Middle East emerged due to the ongoing challenges of LGBTQ+ individuals in the region who have faced a long history of persecution and violence. Several countries in this area still criminalize same-sex behaviour, with punishments as severe as the death penalty. Turkey and Iran have some of the earliest examples of queer radicalism, with the emergence of several LGBTQ+ activist groups in the 1970s and 80s. These underground groups set out to challenge the oppressive laws and societal values that affected queer individuals across their countries.

Some important queer actions from the past include the first pride events held in middle eastern countries:

- 1979 - Israel hosted its first pride protest in Rabin Square.
- 1993 - Tel Aviv hosted its first pride march, which has since developed into one of the biggest Middle Eastern pride events to exist. Some years saw 250,000 participants.
- 2003 - Istanbul hosted its first pride parade. 10 years later, during the 2013 event, over 100,000 people were in attendance.
- 2017 - Beirut hosted its first pride event. Their efforts are focused on marches aimed at decriminalizing homosexuality.

In addition, the Middle East has a small network of organizations that are set in place to aid the LGBTQ+ community and support them through the ongoing discrimination they face. These organizations include Rainbow Street, OutRight Action International, Helem and Majal.

=== Africa ===
In recent years, many African countries have seen an increase in public controversies and political debates over homosexuality and LGBTQ+ rights. The political and public attitude towards these issues can, in some ways, be linked to colonial influence over the years. Even in postcolonial African societies, politics regarding sexuality, which originated from missionaries and colonial influence, continue to have an effect.

Africa authoritarian regimes tend to address radical activism with aggressive measures. This is partially due to the fact that peaceful protests are often criminalized.

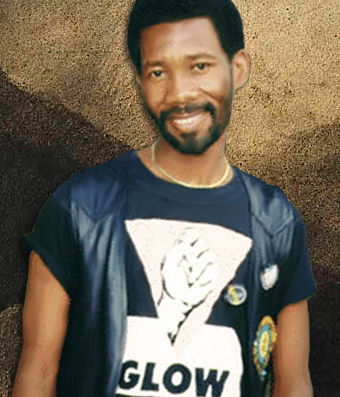
Simon Nkoli

The first LGBTQ+ community centre in Ghana was opened by Alex Kofi Donkor in January 2021 but only remained open for a month before being shut down by authorities. African radical queer activist, Simon Tseko Nkoli, formed the Gay and Lesbian Organization of the Witwatersrand (GLOW) and was one of the first gay men in Africa to identify as HIV positive. Along with Beverley Palesa Ditsie, he also organized South Africa's first Pride March in 1990. In 1998, the same year anti-gay laws were repealed in South Africa, Nkoli died from an AIDS-related illness. In 2006, South Africa became the fifth country to legalize same-sex marriage. In Uganda, laws criminalizing the LGBTQ+ community still exist, in part due to the impact of colonialism on the country. The country went as far as to criminalize the promotion of homosexuality and advocacy for LGBTQ+ rights in 2014; however, it was ruled invalid six months later by the Constitutional Court. This law is said to have been influenced by views in the United States regarding similar issues. In 2011, David Kato, an openly gay person, was bludgeoned to death after working as an advocacy officer for the Sexual Minorities Uganda Group (SMUG).

Today, nearly half the countries in the world where homosexuality is outlawed are in Africa.

=== Europe ===
Despite same-sex relations being legal in all European countries, there remain minimal rights protections for members of the LGBTQ+ community. Furthermore, these rights protections vary based on the geographical origin of different European countries. For example, same-sex marriages are legally recognized in most Western European countries, while in the majority of Eastern European countries, same-sex relations are recognized as civil unions or not recognized whatsoever. As of 2019, of the 15 Western European countries, the majority of the adult population supports same-sex marriages. This is contrasted by the opinions in Central and Eastern Europe because as of 2019, no Central or Eastern European country allows same-sex couples to legally get married, only to be recognized as civil unions.

==== Central and Eastern Europe ====
After World War II, considerable parts of Central and Eastern European countries were invaded by the Soviet Union and deemed as State-socialist countries. Despite this, some of the countries that were under the Soviet Union took some steps towards the decriminalization of same-sex relationships. In 1961, Czechia and Hungary were the first to decriminalize homosexuality and this was followed by other state-socialist countries such as Bulgaria and Yugoslavia, decriminalizing homosexuality throughout the late 1960s to early 1990s.

Queer radicalism and queer radicalist movements in a Central and Eastern European context are limited due to present reservations surrounding same-sex relationships. The majority of Central and Eastern Europeans reject same-sex relationships and believe it should not be accepted in mainstream society. The rejection of same-sex relationships, marriages, as well as same-sex adoption in some countries, is due to religious reasons (mainly being Orthodox or Christian-based practices) and the belief of maintaining traditional gender roles.

The maintenance of homophobia in Central and Eastern Europe originates from homonationalism from different types of leadership throughout Europe. This includes dictatorships, such as the Soviet Union, as well as European countries that adopted communist practices. Furthermore, current social attitudes and homophobic practices in Central and Eastern Europe are enabled by neopolitics and homophobic political agendas.

Pride celebrations have been hosted in various Eastern European cities, including Prague and Warsaw, with some of the largest Pride parades in Eastern European history in 2018 and 2019, respectively. However, some Eastern European countries have banned Pride celebrations, including Russia.

==== Western Europe ====
From the mid-1950s to the early 1970s, various Homophile organizations started to make themselves public in several Western European countries, such as France and Germany. The uprising of these Homophile movements in Western Europe followed shortly after the various queer radicalist movements had emerged in North America. After Stonewall, many instances of queer radicalism and activism were proven to be increasingly progressive throughout several Western European countries. In the early 1970s, various European cities hosted their first pride parades, the first cities including Dublin, Oslo, and London.

These early pride demonstrations drastically changed legislation across Western European countries. Sweden is one of the more progressive European countries, providing access to free sex change surgery and removing homosexuality as a mental disorder. This was followed by multiple European countries decriminalizing and legalizing same-sex relationships.

== Present-day advocacy ==
Present-day LGBTQ+ advocacy tends to lean towards focusing attention on state regulation of sexuality and inclusion within the community. The regulation of what is "right" or "wrong" when it comes to sexuality has made it challenging for people within the LGBTQ+ to gain any sort of social or political power. From the 1990s to the 2000s, the radical queer faded into what is called queer liberalism. Individuals and organizations went from trying to dismantle institutions to seeking formal equality and recognition.

In 2011, the UN Human Rights Council endorsed the protection of sexual minorities, and in most countries, same-sex sexual acts are now legal. In 2003 the United States decriminalized homosexuality. In 2005, same-sex marriage became legal in Canada. In 2013, the United States gave same-sex marriage federal recognition. In 2015, the United States legalized same-sex marriage. In 2017, Canada passed Bill C-16, banning discrimination against transgender individuals. The rights of LGBTQ+ people may have advanced, but in present day, they are under increasing attack from certain groups, mostly cultural conservatives. In the United States alone, in 2022, state legislators introduced a total number of 315 anti-LGBTQ+ bills, however, only 29 of these passed into law.

The present-day LGBTQ+ individuals and groups are working to rebuild a radical movement that is connected directly to decolonization, anti-capitalism, and anti-racist movements.
