= GALA Queer Archive =

The GALA Queer Archive (previously known as the Gay and Lesbian Memory in Action), also known by its acronym, GALA, is an organization that documents social and legal history of LGBTIQA+ individuals and organizations in South Africa and attempts to correct prevailing stereotypes and misperceptions about same-sex relationships in Africa.

== The organization ==
GALA was formed in 1997 as an offshoot of the South African History Archives, it was fashioned after Homodok in Netherlands and the Lesbian Herstory Archives in U.S. The name of the organization was previously known as The Gay and Lesbian Archives of South Africa from where it got the acronym GALA. In 2007, the name was changed to its present form.

The archives of GALA is located at the Historical Papers department of the William Cullen Library at University of the Witwatersrand. The archives contains social, political and constitutional aspects of LGBTIQA+ lives in South Africa. Documents in the archives include legal notes, oral history of LGBT in South Africa, records of South African LGBT organizations, intimate documents submitted by individuals and photographs.

== Projects ==
GALA organizes and participates in educational programs and training that encourages equality in South Africa. In the late 1990s, it developed an oral history project partly to improve the stories of lesbians in its archives. Another project, African Women's Oral History was initiated in 2003 to include Southern and Eastern African countries. In May 2015, it coordinated a workshop to promote equality in the workplace and raise awareness about homophobia in the workplace.

GALA also publishes writing by and about LGBT people under the imprint MaThoko's Books. Founded in 2011, the imprint has published a number of books, including Queer Africa: New and Collected Fiction which won the 2014 Lambda Literary Award for an LGBT anthology.

MaThoko's Books is named for a South African woman who ran an illegal tavern in KwaThema in the 1980s and 1990s. The tavern became noteworthy as the headquarters of the Gay and Lesbian Organization of the Witwatersrand, an LGBT activism organisation founded by South African activists Simon Nkoli, Beverly Ditsie and Linda Ngcobo.
