= Robbin Ami Silverberg =

American artist

Robbin Ami Silverberg (born 1958) is an American/Canadian artist specializing in artists' books.

As a teacher, and a founder of both Dobbin Mill, a hand-papermaking studio, and Dobbin Books, an artists' book studio, Robbin has created great number of artists' books—both on her own and in collaboration with other artists, all over the U.S., Canada, Europe, and South Africa.

== Early life and education ==
Silverberg graduated from Princeton University in 1980 and began making her own paper in 1980.

== Artist's books ==
While many of her works look like traditional books, some seem closer to sculpture. Her artists' books take months or years to create and involve a laborious process of producing, authoring and binding each book.

In the article, "Broaching texts and reading material: artist books by Robbin Ami Silverberg" Lois Martin discusses four artists' books by Robbin Ami Silverberg that refer in some manner to cloth and clothmaking.

Robbin Ami Silverberg, Brush (sequence of opening), 1995-1996

Robbin Ami Silverberg, Morning Prayer, 1997

Robbin Ami Silverberg, The Emperor's Clothes, 1997

== Paper-making ==
Silverberg runs a small papermaking studio called Dobbin Mill in Williamsburg, Brooklyn, where she grows plants, using them for their fiber to make into paper. She also design, prints & binds her books and when needed writes the text. "The paper I make is produced specifically for each book," says Ms. Silverberg, who also teaches book arts at the Pratt Institute in Clinton Hill. "Since I'm starting from scratch, I might as well do everything from scratch." "Basically you're taking a plant, pulling it apart in water, and then when you push out the water, the fibers try to bond together," she explains. "It's just a chemical bonding that's going on. You're restructuring your plant into a paper form."

== Exhibitions ==
Silverberg was featured in the 2016 ‘Artists’ Books and Africa,’ exhibit at the Smithsonian Museum of African Art curated by Janet Stanley. She and Kim Berman worked with twenty-two African artists, each making a print of two people on the theme of creation, to create a surrealist ‘Exquisite Corpse’ work called "Emandulo Re-Creation."
Robbin's showed one work, a series of postings she put out in the streets of NYC, in the 2010 group show called, "You Are Here → Mapping the Psychogeography of New York City", at the Pratt Institute's Manhattan Gallery, guest curated by Katharine Harmonatt.

On September 22, 2012, Silverberg participated on a panel at Yale University Art Gallery called, "Ten Years Later: Artists Remember 9/11."

== Selected awards ==
European University Flensburg, Germany, Dept Art & Media: Artist Residency, Summer 2017

Keynote speaker for Booknesses colloquium, Johannesburg, South Africa, Spring 2017

Pratt Institute Faculty Development Grant 2015

The College Book Art Association (CBAA), Oakland, CA 2012
