= Phumi Mtetwa =

Feminist and LGBT South African Activist

- Born: 1973 (age 52–53); East Rand
- Citizenship: South Africa
- Occupations: LGBTQI+ and human rights activism
- Years active: 1980 - Present

Phumi Mtetwa, born in November 1973 in KwaThema on the East Rand, 45 km west of Johannesburg, South Africa, has served as a political activist since the 1980s. She focuses on linking economic history, violence, discrimination, and exclusion as crucial elements of the reimagination of rights. Since the beginning of her career, she has believed in ensuring social justice and change for women and other marginalized communities within South Africa, including LGBTQI individuals. She has worked globally, with a focus on Southern Africa and Latin America.

== Biography ==
Her upbringing included connections to the anti-apartheid movement, the women’s movement, the LGBTI movement, the feminist movement, and the global anti-capitalist movement, which heavily influenced the trajectory of her career. Growing up in South Africa, she saw the interests of mining companies, the government, and the Chieftains prioritized, while the interests of women and the land were ignored. She may have become inspired to fight for rights by her single mother, who worked long weeks at a telephone manufacturing company to care for Mtetwa and her two older brothers.

When she began her activism in the 1980s, LGBTQI identities were highly judged within South African Society. Mtetwa first came out to her closest comrades, although wasn't entirely accepted in her identity; her comrades feared she may not take the anti-apartheid movement seriously if she was fighting for other rights at the same time. She would move to Joburg in the early 1990s, where the anonymity of a large city allowed her to experiment with her identity and expression of self. She currently remains in Joburg with her partner, Salimah Valiani, and their six-year-old child, Maleeah.

== 1985 rent boycott ==
Phumi Mtetwa’s political career officially began in 1985, when she organized rent boycotts to combat and resist Apartheid. This would be the first of many civil disobedience campaigns for her. She went door-to-door speaking the household elders, encouraging them to not pay the rent on their state-owned housing, which only continued to fund the oppressive system of Apartheid.

The initial purpose of the multi-year boycott was to protest rent increases, although the movement quickly began to include other political aims. At least 50 townships were included in the boycott, and 45 were still actively boycotting by the end of 1990. Residents of these townships claimed that the services they were provided were not worth the exorbitant prices they were forced to pay.

In the case of Soweto, South Africa, a township close to the Johannesburg region, roughly 80% of the Black residents refused to pay rent, water, or electricity. Threats to evict these residents led to violent clashes in 1986 and a crackdown in 1998 that left many without water or electricity. Ultimately, chronic discontent within townships, particularly over the housing, infrastructural development, and rent is what led to such a large movement.

== Association with Organizations, Initiatives, and Movements ==
Phumi Mtetwa has been involved in several organizations, initiatives, and movements throughout her career, besides. the 1985 Rent Boycott. She currently serves as the Regional Director of JASS Southern Africa, otherwise known as Just Associates, where she prioritizes Feminist Popular Education and developing strategies for change and fostering connections globally.

She was also a part of the Health Justice Initiative as an HJI Advisory Group Member, was part of Witwatersrand Technikon, was a former Co-Secretary of the International Lesbian and Gay Association, was involved in mobilizations against the Free Trade Agreement of the Americas, was a Co-Founder of the Masithandane End-Hate Collective, was a member of the Global Black Victory Lab, was involved in the LGBT South-South Dialogue, helped influence LGBTI perspectives in the World Social Forum, was involved in the Our Bodies Our Lives movement of HIV positive women in Malawi, was a member of GLOW, was the executive director of the Lesbian and Gay Equality Project, was involved in the Treatment Action Campaign, was a founding chairperson of the Other Foundation, and co-founded the National Coalition for Gay and Lesbian Equality.

Finally, she has served in numerous broad leadership positions with the AIDS Law Project of South Africa and FEDAEPS from Ecuador.

== Awards and recognition ==
Mtetwa has received numerous awards for her activism and efforts. She won the Feathers’ Award, the Kopano Living Legends Award, and an award by the US coalition the Rising Majority. She has also been recognized as a Social Change Initiative Fellow for her campaigning and activism. In 1995, Mtetwa and Simon Nkoli won a Stonewall Equality Award for their gay rights activism.

Besides that, she has received various high-profile accolades, positions, and titles for her contributions to LGBTQI activism and socioeconomic justice.

== Literature ==
Phumi Mtetwa has written various books and articles, often focused on racism, economic exclusion, and organizing. This includes Globalization: LGBT Alternatives, a book she co-edited, and her article “Correct the Homophobes.”

=== Literature mentioning Phumi Mtetwa ===
Besides the literature she has produced, Phumi Mtetwa has been mentioned in numerous books, including: Women and Bisexuality: A Global Perspective, Routledge Handbook of Queer Development Studies, Warped: Gay Normality and Queer Anti-Capitalism, The Cultural Politics of Female Sexuality in South Africa, Pride: Protest and Celebration, Race in Post-Racial Europe: An Intersectional Analysis, Seeds of New Hope: Pan-African Peace Studies for the 21st Century, and many more.
