= Linda Ngcobo =

South African LGBTQ activist

- Died: Feb 1993
- Cause of death: AIDS-related illness
- Known for: co-founding GLOW, co-writing an essay about gay sexuality in the townships

Linda Ngcobo (c. 1965 – February 1993) was a South African LGBTQ activist and a founding member of the Gay and Lesbian Organization of Witwatersrand (GLOW). He was one of the first Black gay activists to die of AIDS-related illness in South Africa.

== Biography ==
Ngcobo was Zulu. He studied to be a teacher and resided in Soweto.

GLOW was established in 1988 by Ngcobo along with Simon Nkoli and Beverley Palesa Ditsie. The organization held its first Miss GLOW competition, an annual drag show organized by Ngcobo, in Soweto in 1988.

With Hugh McLean, Ngcobo co-authored "‘Abangibhamayo bathi ngimnandi’ (Those who fuck me say I’m tasty): Gay sexuality in Reef township", an essay in the 1995 anthology Defiant Desire: Gay and Lesbian Lives in South Africa. McLean and Ngcobo interviewed 20 men about their sexuality. Their work showed how gay sexuality is "unexpectedly integrated into township culture". They defined terms such as skesana, meaning the receptive male partner in anal sex, and pantsula "(macho township guy) who sleeps with what he believes to be a hermaphrodite or with someone who pretends, and who he pretends, is female" Ngcobo recounted ways that he would make his body seem more female when having sex with a pantsula.

Some people in Ngcobo's township considered him to be a woman, including his family, who assigned him chores associated with women. One of his boyfriends thought he could give birth. Ngcobo briefly took female hormones. It appears that he identified as both non-binary and a gay man.

Ngcobo died of AIDS-related kidney failure in February 1993. He was one of the first Black gay activists to die of AIDS-related illness in South Africa. Many people attended his funeral in Phiri Hall in Soweto. He was a choir member in the African Apostolic Church, where his father served as an elder and lay preacher. GLOW members attended the funeral and covered his coffin with the organization's banner during the church service. According to scholar Mandisa Mbali, this may have been the first AIDS-related political funeral in South Africa.

== See also ==
- LGBTQ rights in South Africa
