= Pride celebrations in South Africa =

South African LGBT advocacy action

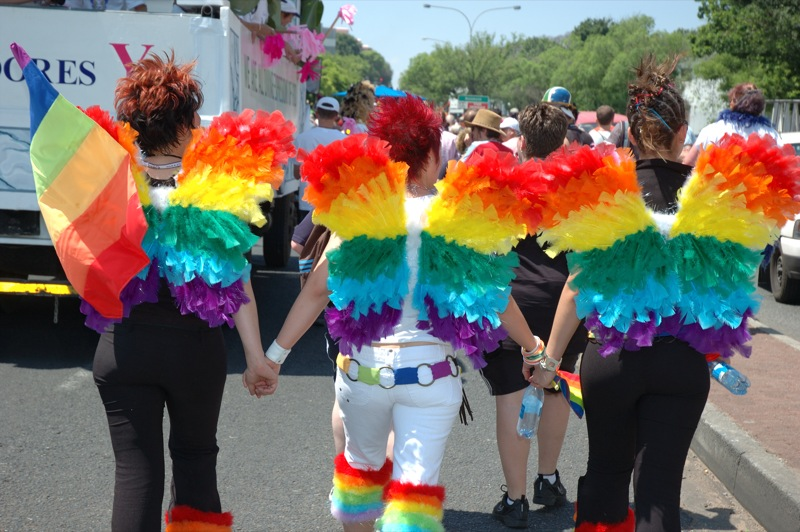
Women marching in Joburg Pride parade in 2006

There have been pride parades in South Africa celebrating LGBT pride since 1990. South African pride parades were historically used for political advocacy protesting against legal discrimination against LGBT people, and for the celebration of equality before the law after the apartheid era. They are increasingly used for political advocacy against LGBT hate crimes, such as the so-called corrective rape of lesbians in townships, and to remember victims thereof.

== Johannesburg ==
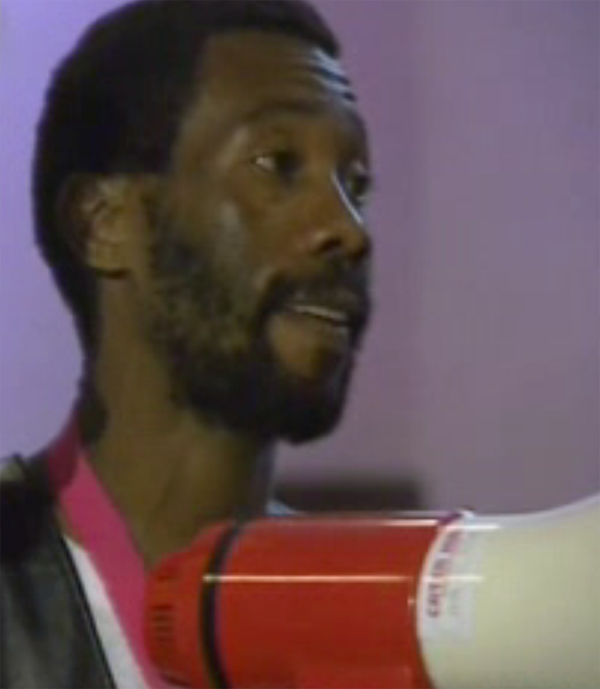
Simon Nkoli speaking at the first pride parade in 1990

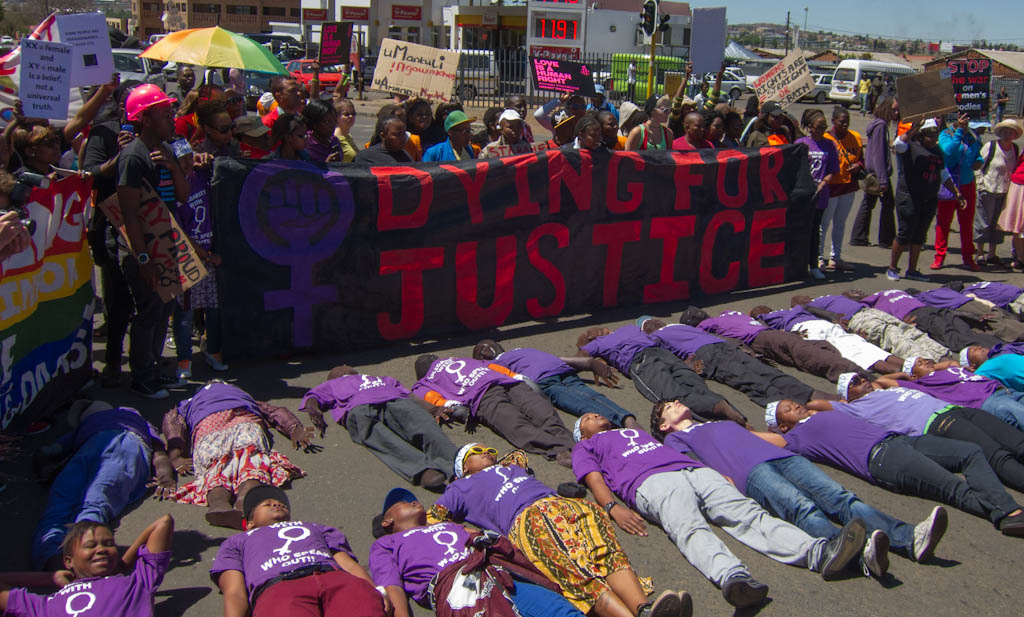
Soweto Pride 2012 participants protest against violence against lesbians with a "Dying for Justice" banner and T-shirts which read "Solidarity with women who speak out".

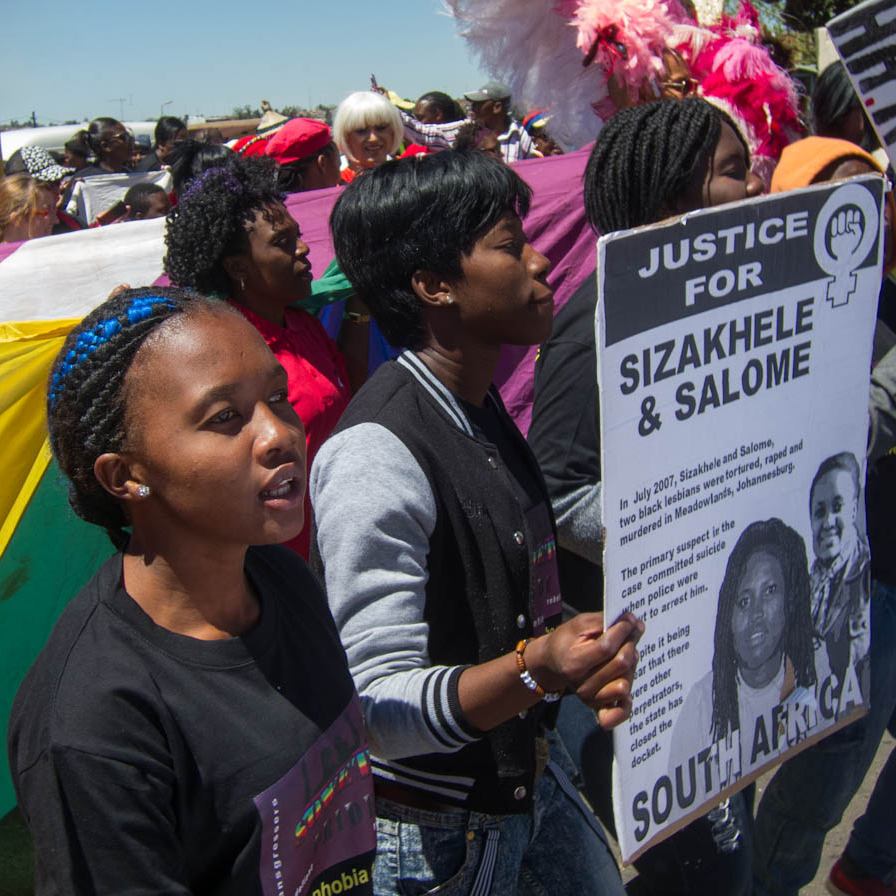
Soweto Pride 2012 participants remember two lesbians who were raped and murdered.

The Gay and Lesbian Organisation of the Witwatersrand (GLOW) was founded by gay anti-apartheid activist Simon Nkoli in 1988. The first South African pride parade was held towards the end of the apartheid era in Johannesburg on 13 October 1990, the first such event on the African continent. The first event attended by 800 people was initiated and organised by GLOW, and the crowd was addressed by Nkoli, Donné Rundle, Beverly Ditsie, Edwin Cameron and gay Dutch Reformed Church minister Hendrik Pretorius. In his speech, Nkoli said:

I'm fighting for the abolition of apartheid. And I fight for the right of freedom of sexual orientation. These are inextricably linked with each other. I cannot be free as a black man if I am not free as a gay man.

— Simon Nkoli (First pride parade, Johannesburg, 13 October 1990)

Section Nine of the country's 1996 Constitution provides for equality and freedom from discrimination on the grounds of sexual orientation among other factors. Over time, the celebration factor came to overshadow the protest factor despite ongoing social issues. The 2012 parade was marred by a clash between activist participants and members of the Joburg Pride organising body, and the organising body disbanded in April 2013 due to internal conflict about whether the event should continue to be used for political advocacy. Two new committees were formed around May 2013. One of them was called "Johannesburg Pride" and would carry on the history of the oldest and largest LGBTQIA Pride in South Africa & (Africa), The other committee would organise a "Johannesburg People's Pride", which is "envisioned as an inclusive and explicitly political movement for social justice". As of June 2019, Johannesburg Pride is the largest Pride event in Africa. (Note: As of June 2019, New York City's NYC Pride March is North America's biggest Pride parade. For Stonewall 50 – WorldPride NYC 2019 up to five million took part over the final weekend, with an estimated four million in attendance at the parade. São Paulo, Brazil's event, Parada do Orgulho GLBT de São Paulo, is South America's largest, and is listed by Guinness World Records as the world's largest Pride parade starting in 2006 with 2.5 million people. They broke the Guinness record in 2009 with four million attendees. They have kept the title from 2006 to at least 2016. They had five million attend in 2017. As of 2019 it has three to five million each year. As of June 2019, Spain's Madrid Pride, Orgullo Gay de Madrid (MADO), is Europe's biggest, it had 3.5 million attendees when it hosted WorldPride in 2017. As of June 2019 the largest LGBTQ events include: in Asia it is Taiwan Pride in China's Taipei; in the Middle East it is Tel Aviv Pride in Israel; in Oceania, it is Australia's Sydney Mardi Gras Parade; in Africa it is South Africa's Johannesburg Pride.) Johannesburg pride has recently faced controversy due to the commercialisation of Pride. After publicly stating that Amazon would be a sponsor of pride 2025, various queer communities decided to boycott JHB pride, as Amazon is currently funding genocide. This was met by a response from Kaye Ally (the self-claimed “founder” of JHB pride) where she denied being sponsored by Amazon. As part of her official response Mrs. Ally included videos of hate speech and insinuated that the groups choosing to boycott JHB pride was the source of the video. This was false information spread with the intent of causing division among the queer community.

In response to the way this backlash was addressed, a group of queer protesters holding “no pride in genocide” and “free Palestine” posters lead the 2025 JHB pride march. The protestors held a moment of silence for all those who are currently oppressed, specifically focusing on the genocides that are occurring globally as well as for LGBTQ+ members who have been lost due to hatred. The group voiced their concerns regarding rainbow- and pink-washing of genocide and proclaimed that this should not be done in the name of all queer people. After the moment of silence the group decided not to continue the march, instead holding their posters and chanting as the march continued. Chants included: “free Palestine”, “free Sudan” , “free Uganda” and “free Congo”.

== Cape Town ==
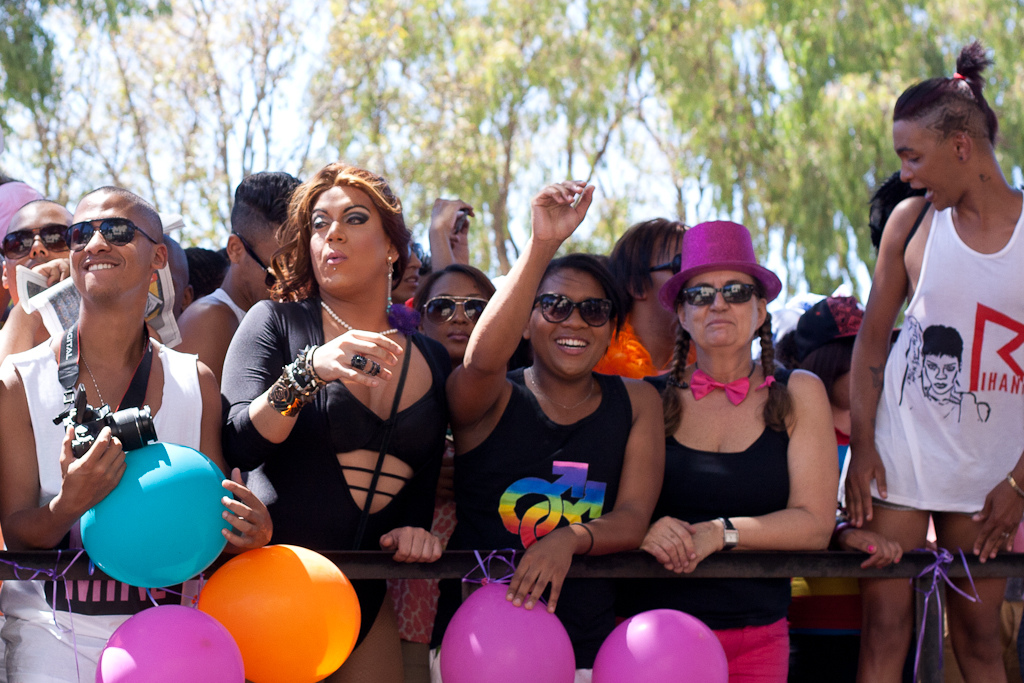
Cape Town Pride 2014

Annual pride parades have been held in Cape Town subject to interruptions since 1993, and as part of the Cape Town Pride event since 2001.

The Mother City Queer Project (MCQP) costume party has also been held annually in Cape Town (nicknamed the Mother City) since 1994.

== Other areas ==
- Eastern Cape:

Nelson Mandela Bay Pride has taken place annually in Port Elizabeth since 2011.

- Free State:

Free State Pride has been held in Bloemfontein, one of South Africa's three national capitals, since 2012.

- Gauteng:

Other pride parades held in the Johannesburg area include Soweto Pride which has taken place annually since 2005 in Meadowlands, Soweto, and Ekurhuleni Pride which has taken place annually since 2009 in the East Rand township of KwaThema. On 24 April 2011, LGBT rights activist and Ekurhuleni Pride Organising Committee member Noxolo Nogwaza was raped and murdered in KwaThema, in what was described as a hate crime by Human Rights Watch and Amnesty International. Three years earlier, lesbian Banyana Banyana footballer Eudy Simelane was raped and murdered in the same township. In 2016, Ekurhuleni Pride took place in the township of Vosloorus. Since then, the event has been held in Centurion and KwaThema.

Pretoria Pride has been held annually in Pretoria, South Africa's executive capital, since 2013.

- KwaZulu-Natal:

Durban Pride has been held every year in Durban, the largest city in the province, since 2011.

The Pink Mynah Festival is held in Pietermaritzburg, the provincial capital, in October. The event includes a beauty pageant, a fashion show, a pride parade and a picnic.

- Limpopo:

Limpopo Pride has been held in Polokwane since 2012. In 2015, various government officials, including the mayors of Polokwane and the Capricorn District Municipality as well as councillors and members of the police service, marched in the parade.

- Mpumalanga:

On 9 August 2014, a pride parade took place in Nelspruit. This marked the first time a pride parade was held in the province of Mpumalanga. One month later, on 6 September 2014, the town of Ermelo organised its first pride parade.

- North West:

The first pride parade in the province was held in November 2007 in Mahikeng, the provincial capital.

Pride parades have taken place annually in Klerksdorp since 2010.

On 1 October 2016, a pride parade was held in the township of Kanana.

- Western Cape:

The Pink Loerie Mardi Gras has been held in Knysna since 2001.

The Khumbulani Pride ("Remember Pride"), which aims to honour the lives of LGBT people lost in hate violence in the Western Cape, has taken place in different townships in the province every year since 2013. In 2013, it was held in Gugulethu and remembered hate crime victims such as 19-year-old Zoliswa Nkonyana who was stabbed and stoned to death in Khayelitsha in 2006 for living openly as a lesbian. In 2014 and 2015, it took place in the townships of Samora Michel and Khayelitsha, respectively. In 2016, the event was held in the township of Langa. Since then, the event has been held in Strand and Delft.

== See also ==
- LGBT rights in South Africa
- List of LGBT events in South Africa
- Gay pride flag of South Africa
