= Phiri, Soweto =

Phiri
- Location within Gauteng Location within South Africa
- Coordinates: 26.270°S 27.855°E
- Country: South Africa
- Province: Gauteng
- Municipality: City of Johannesburg
- Main Place: Soweto

Area
  - Total: 0.92 km^{2} (0.36 sq mi)

Population (2011)
  - Total: 15,875
  - Density: 17,000/km^{2} (45,000/sq mi)

Racial makeup (2011)
  - Black African: 99.5%
  - Coloured: 0.2%
  - Indian/Asian: 0.1%
  - White: 0.1%
  - Other: 0.1%

First languages (2011)
  - Zulu: 37.2%
  - Sotho: 33.6%
  - Tswana: 7.7%
  - English: 6.2%
  - Other: 15.3%
- Time zone: UTC+2 (SAST)
- Postal code (street): 1818

Phiri is a township in the urban area of Soweto in South Africa. The township was founded in 1956, as part of apartheid segregation started by the state that year. Phiri, along with several other areas, was created to house Sotho and Tswana-speakers. By 1964, Phiri had 11,332 residents and 2,190 homes.

Phiri is the Sotho word for hyena.

It is one of the poorest areas of Soweto. In Mazibuko v City of Johannesburg, 5 residents of Phiri sued the City of Johannesburg for installing pre-paid water meters and limiting the amount of water they could receive for free. The court decided in favor of the city in 2009.

The town is the birthplace of footballer Siphiwe Tshabalala and activist Simon Nkoli.
