= Soweto Pride =

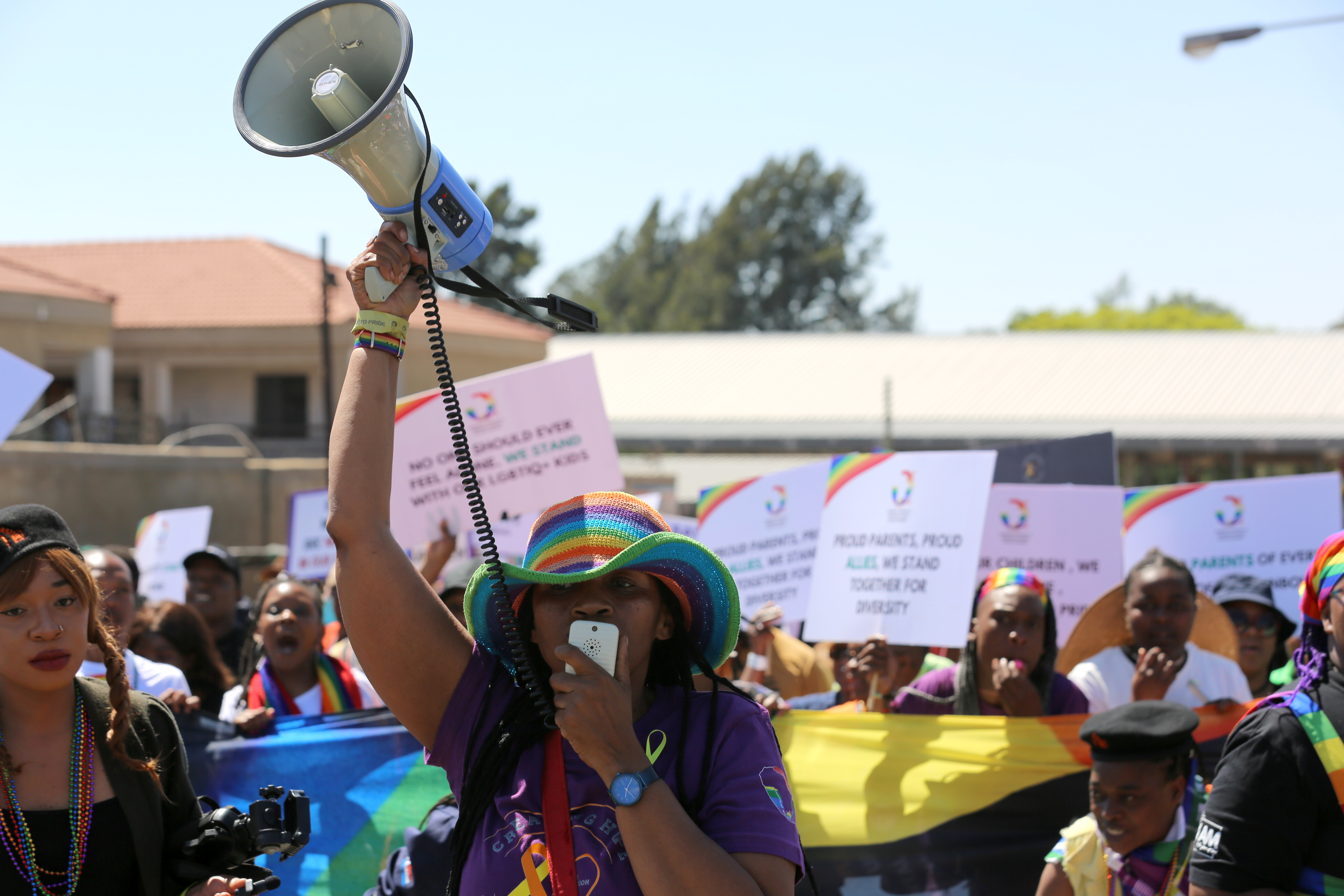
A person wearing a rainbow hat at Soweto Pride 2023 parade holding up a Megaphone and speaks into it.

Soweto Pride is an annual pride parade held in Soweto, a historical black township in Johannesburg, South Africa. The inaugural Soweto Pride was held in 2004 and it happens annually, on the last Saturday of September.

The aim of Soweto Pride is to create a space for primarily black lesbian, queer, and trans women, as well as non-binary people, to participate in pride events, engage with the Soweto community, and unite their voices on issues that affect them.

== History and community background ==
South Africa's apartheid history and the remnants of the legacy of racism still manifest in the mainstream pride parades in South Africa's major cities.

The rights of LGBTQIA+ persons in South Africa have been codified in the post-apartheid 1996 Constitution, which explicitly provides for the protection of people on the basis of their sexual orientation. This made South Africa the first country in the world to protect individuals from discrimination based on sexual orientation constitutionally. Same-sex marriage has been legal since 2006.

However, black lesbian, queer and trans women in South Africa continue to face heightened violence, discrimination, marginalization and exclusion. Soweto Pride was started as a way to create an alternative space for historically excluded black LGBTQIA+ South Africans and make visible their existences, stories and experiences in an affirming and safe environment.

Soweto is a township with a predominantly black, working and middle-class population, and internationally known for the apartheid suppression of the Soweto uprising (1976). As demonstrated through political moments like the Soweto Uprising, the community has a long history of radical and alternative community organizing. This community background is central to the event, which aims to politically challenge white gay hegemony and gentrification in pride parades in Johannesburg, but also confront homophobia in townships.

From its inception Soweto Pride centered black lesbian women. In its further development over the years, the event has engaged the broader LGBTQI+ community, Soweto local civic society organisations, and the broader community. Currently Soweto Pride involves a network of allies, families and friends that joined the event in solidarity.

== Organising and program ==
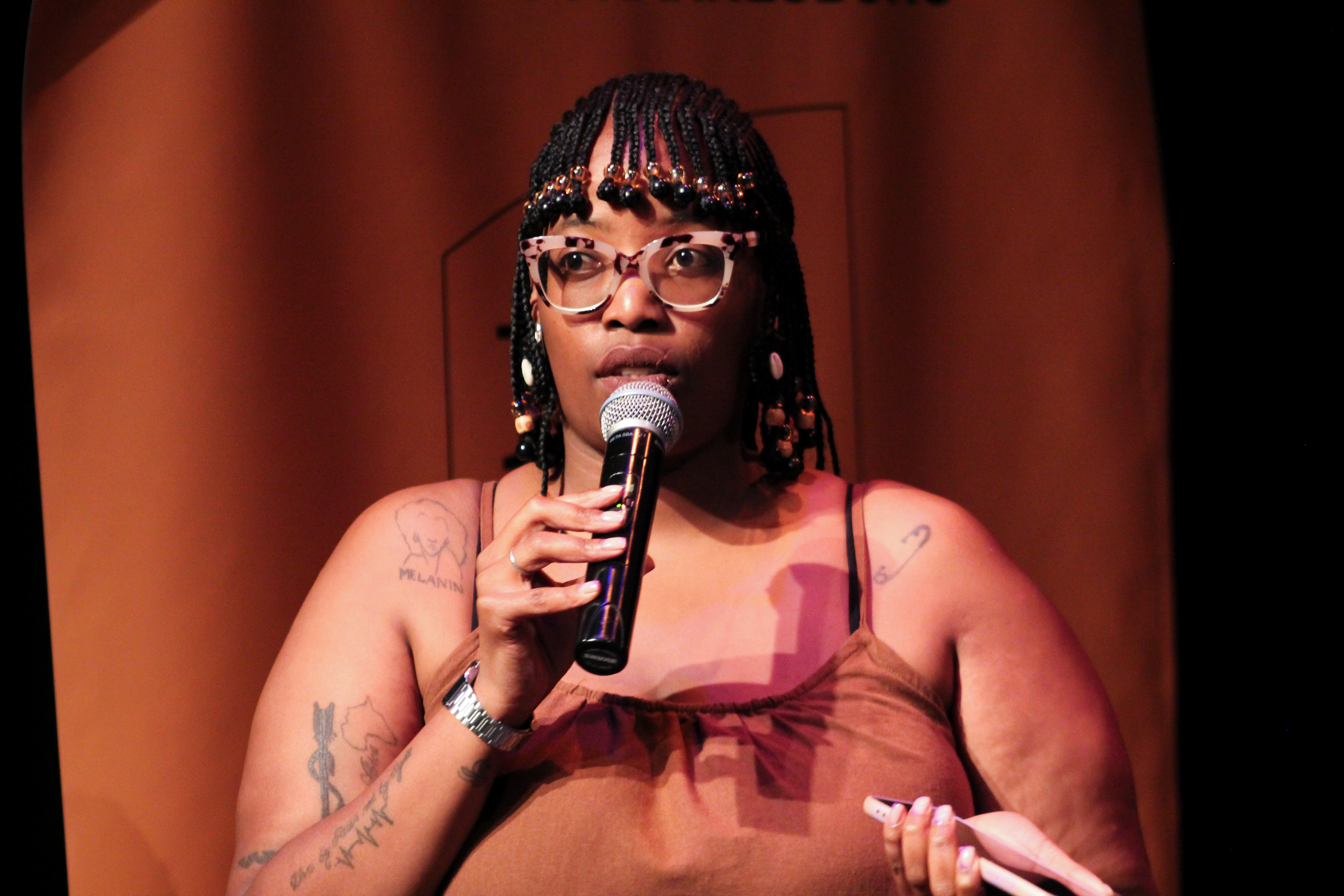
Jade Madingwane, one of the conveners of Soweto Pride speaking at film screening ceremony, as part of the pride celebrations.

Soweto Pride is organised since 2004 by the Forum for the Empowerment of Women (FEW), a black, queer, feminist non-governmental organization. It has been continuously celebrated since then, under a specific theme every year.

It starts on 24 September, in the Heritage Day celebration, and continues with a program of several activities, like exhibitions, concerts, panels and film screenings. The pride march takes place on the last Saturday of September.

== Impact and social reception ==
Soweto Pride has grown by leaps and bounds since it began in 2004 both in the number and identities of the people who attend, visibility of the issues and impact on the community. The people who have joined in the march in the most recent years 2022 and 2023 include black LGBTIQA+ people, their friends and families as well as other races who show up in solidarity with them and the Soweto community. One of the organizers of Soweto Pride, and FEW co-founder Jade Madingwane said that "there are lesbians that have money and then there’s us. The “us” would be the black lesbians who are doing political work more than the white lesbians who are just corporate’ and are part of a wealthy, ‘apolitical’ elite." This highlights the importance of organizing an alternative Pride event, rooted in the traditions of political pride events such as the Stonewall riots.

Official support has evolved, from initial resistance and a lack of recognition to acknowledgment and endorsement in recent years for Soweto Pride. This state support and recognition can be exemplified with the presence of Minister of Justice and Correctional Services in the National Assembly, Ronald Lamola gracing the 2023 Soweto pride and emphasizing that queer rights will always be human rights. Also several members of the City of Johannesburg have show up and support the event with the city mayors over the years joining the event including launching it in 2021.
