= Simon Nkoli =

South African activist (1957–1998)

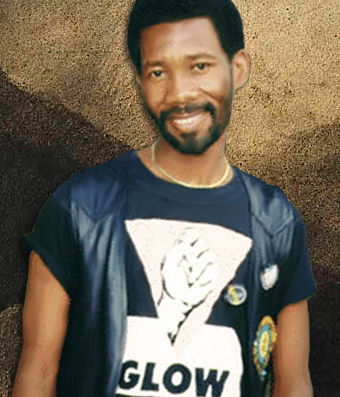
- Born: 26 November 1957 (Note: Some sources say 1959. Some sources say that he was 15 during the 1976 Soweto Uprising, which would mean he was born in 1960.); Soweto, Union of South Africa
- Died: 30 November 1998 (aged 41); Johannesburg, South Africa
- Cause of death: AIDS-related illness
- Burial place: Sebokeng, Gauteng, South Africa
- Occupations: activist, HIV/AIDS educator
- Organisation(s): United Democratic Front, African National Congress, Gay and Lesbian Organisation of the Witwatersrand, Township AIDS Project, National Coalition for Gay and Lesbian Equality
- Known for: Anti-apartheid, gay rights, and AIDS activism

Simon Tseko Nkoli (Note: Sometimes spelled Nkodi, including by Nkoli. Sometimes his name is written Tseko Simon Nkoli.) (26 November 1957 – 30 November 1998) was a South African anti-apartheid, gay rights, and AIDS activist. His anti-apartheid activism as an openly gay man influenced the African National Congress (ANC) to publicly support gay rights and to prohibit discrimination based on sexual orientation in the South African constitution. He organised South Africa's first pride march and was one of the first Black South Africans to disclose that he was living with HIV/AIDS. In his activism, he utilised visibility as a tactic and spoke about the relationship between multiple forms of discrimination. His death from AIDS-related illness influenced fellow activists to establish the Treatment Action Campaign which successfully lobbied the government to expand access to HIV treatment.

Born in Soweto, Nkoli lived with his grandparents in Orange Free State for several years and later moved in with his mother in Sebokeng. Nkoli first became involved in anti-apartheid activism as a high school student during the 1976 Soweto uprising, later becoming active in the Congress of South African Students (COSAS), the United Democratic Front (UDF), and the Vaal Civic Association. Because of his activism, he was repeatedly detained by the police, sometimes for extended periods of time. During the Vaal uprising, he was arrested and imprisoned with 21 other anti-apartheid leaders in 1984. Their charges, which included treason, terrorism, and murder, carried a potential death sentence. During their years-long Delmas Treason Trial, Nkoli was diagnosed with HIV/AIDS and came out as gay to his co-defendants. His case gained international attention and a support campaign, especially among the LGBTQ community. The Gay Association of South Africa (GASA), the predominantly white organisation Nkoli had joined before his arrest, did not offer any support to Nkoli during the trial, provoking criticism from foreign LGBTQ organisations.

After his acquittal in 1988, he co-founded the Gay and Lesbian Organisation of the Witwatersrand (GLOW), a multi-racial organisation that hosted political rallies and social events. At South Africa's first pride march, he made a speech stating that he was fighting against both racism and homophobia and could not fight one without also fighting the other. With the National Coalition for Gay and Lesbian Equality (NCGLE), he lobbied successfully for anti-sodomy laws to be overturned and for anti-gay discrimination to be prohibited in the South African constitution. Nkoli co-founded the Township AIDS Project to provide education about HIV prevention to Black people, especially gay men in the townships. As a health educator, he took a sex positive, harm reduction approach. Like many South Africans, Nkoli struggled to consistently access effective HIV/AIDS treatment, and he vocally criticised the government's response to the epidemic.

== Early life and family ==
Nkoli was born on 26 November 1957 in Phiri, Soweto, a Black township in the Johannesburg area. His family spoke Sotho, and he was the oldest of four children. When he was 9 years old, Nkoli had to conceal his parents from the police in a cabinet because they lived in an area forbidden to them by the apartheid-era Group Areas Act. He later recounted this experience in "Wardrobes" in the anthology Defiant Desire: Gay and Lesbian Lives in South Africa and compared his experiences of racism to his experiences of homophobia:

the closet I have come out of is similar to the wardrobe my relieved parents stepped out of when I unlocked them after the police left. If you are black in South Africa, the inhuman laws of apartheid closet you. If you are gay in South Africa, the homophobic customs and laws of this society closet you. If you are black and gay in South Africa, well, then it really is all the same closet, the same wardrobe. Inside is darkness and oppression. Outside is freedom.

After Nkoli's parents separated, he lived with his grandparents on a farm and attended primary school in Orange Free State for several years. He later moved in with his mother and step-father in Sebokeng, a township in the Vaal Triangle area. Nkoli's family was working class. His mother, Elizabeth, worked in housekeeping and retail while his step-father, Elias, cooked for a hotel. He attended several schools including Lebohang Junior Secondary School and St. Bosco Boys High School.

Elizabeth was upset when Nkoli came out as gay. Hoping to change his sexual orientation, she took him to multiple sangoma healers, a Christian clergyman, and a psychologist. The psychologist encouraged Nkoli to accept his sexual orientation. Nkoli later called himself "lucky" that, instead of disowning him, his mother "tried to help me, in the ways that she knew how". Eventually, Elizabeth accepted Nkoli's sexual orientation, and they maintained a relationship throughout his life. She died in 2023, 25 years after Nkoli's death.

== Early activism ==
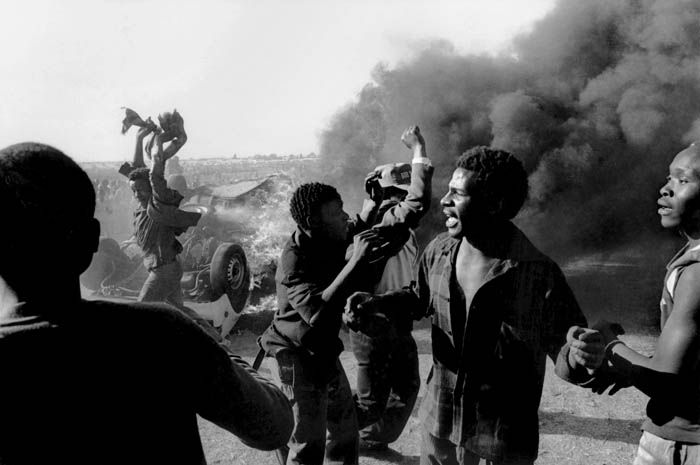
Anti-apartheid protest in South Africa in the 1980s

Nkoli first became involved in activism in high school, organising students and spearheading a campaign opposing Afrikaans as his school's language of instruction during the 1976 Soweto uprising. During the uprising, he was arrested for the first time. Nkoli was active in several groups including Young Christian Students, Young Christian Workers, and Vaal Youth Crusade.

While attending secretarial college in Johannesburg in 1980, Nkoli joined the Congress of South African Students (COSAS), an anti-apartheid group. He became secretary for its Vaal Triangle branch while his close friend Gcina Malindi served as chair. At the time, the Vaal Triangle branch primarily organised around student concerns and rent increases. After Nkoli came out as gay to his colleagues in COSAS, the group debated whether he should give up his position as secretary, with some arguing that homosexuality is "un-African". Ultimately, 80% of the group voted for him to continue as secretary.

Affiliated with both the United Democratic Front (UDF) and the then-banned African National Congress (ANC), Nkoli gave speeches and participated in marches, boycotts, and sit-ins. He was frequently detained by the police for his activism, sometimes for months at a time. On several occasions, his mother was harassed by police who came to her home looking for him. Additionally, Nkoli worked at the South African Institute of Race Relations and assisted political prisoners via the Detainees Support Committee.

In 1983, Nkoli joined the Gay Association of South Africa (GASA). A mostly white organisation which considered itself to be apolitical, GASA occasionally released statements denouncing homophobia and did not publicly condemn apartheid. Nkoli opposed GASA's apolitical stance and was unable to attend many of their events because they were held in white-only locations. In an effort to create a more Black-inclusive space within GASA, Nkoli recruited new members via the City Press. They met on Saturdays—initially at the GASA office but later at members' homes in Soweto after white members complained that they were disruptive. Nkoli felt that GASA tokenised their Black members, to misrepresent the group as non-racist to the international gay community. In May 1984, Nkoli and the new members formed the Saturday Group, a GASA-affiliated organisation that aimed to be a place for gay people of all races. According to Nkoli, the Saturday Group primarily provided counselling to gay Black people but also organised parties and had white members. Nkoli estimated that it had 124 members when he was arrested in September 1984, after which it disbanded.

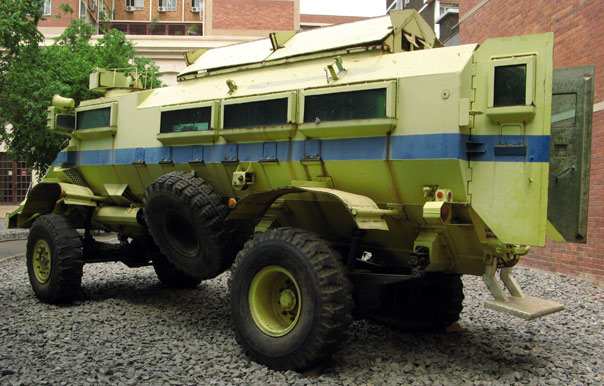
Casspir police vehicle

The Vaal Civic Association (VCA) was formed in 1983 to organise around socio-economic issues in the Vaal Triangle area, including housing, transportation, and labour rights. It was affiliated with the UDF. Nkoli, who was active in the VCA, engaged in tenant organising and gave speeches in support of rent strikes. On 3 September 1984, the VCA organised a general strike and march. Although the organisers had intended for the protest to be nonviolent, it escalated into widespread rioting after the police attempted to halt the march. According to Nkoli: "The police as usual intervened. They wanted the march to disperse. People became angry. Police started shooting at our people, setting dogs on them. There were police casspirs all over the place... By 11 a.m. lots of people had been shot dead." The unrest, known as the Vaal uprising, spread to other areas and continued into 1986.

== Delmas treason trial ==
On 23 September 1984, Nkoli attended the funeral of a student activist who had been killed in the Vaal uprising. At the burial, the police attacked the mourners, beating them with sjamboks and firing tear gas. Nearly 600 people were arrested for attending an "illegal gathering". The known activists, including Nkoli and Malindi, were separated from the other detainees by the Security Branch and severely beaten again. For at least nine months, Nkoli was held without charge, mostly in solitary confinement. The police interrogated Nkoli about his political views and sexuality, particularly about his relationships with white men. They told him that the ANC would never accept him because he was a moffie, a slur for a gay man. He later recounted that the police would "bring in things like a baton and tell me to go fuck myself with it. They also said they'd put me in prison with others and get me raped."

In June 1985, Nkoli and 21 other political leaders were charged with treason, murder, terrorism, and furthering the aims of the ANC, a banned organisation. Largely related to the Vaal uprising, the charges carried a potential sentence of death, and the defendants were denied bail. Their trial became known as the Delmas Treason Trial because of its initial location in the small town of Delmas. It was later moved to the Palace of Justice in Pretoria. The defendants included Malindi as well as high-ranking anti-apartheid leaders Terror Lekota, Popo Molefe, and Moss Chikane. Most of the defendants, like Nkoli, were affiliated with the UDF. Their legal team included George Bizos, Zak Yacoob, and Caroline Heaton-Nicholls.

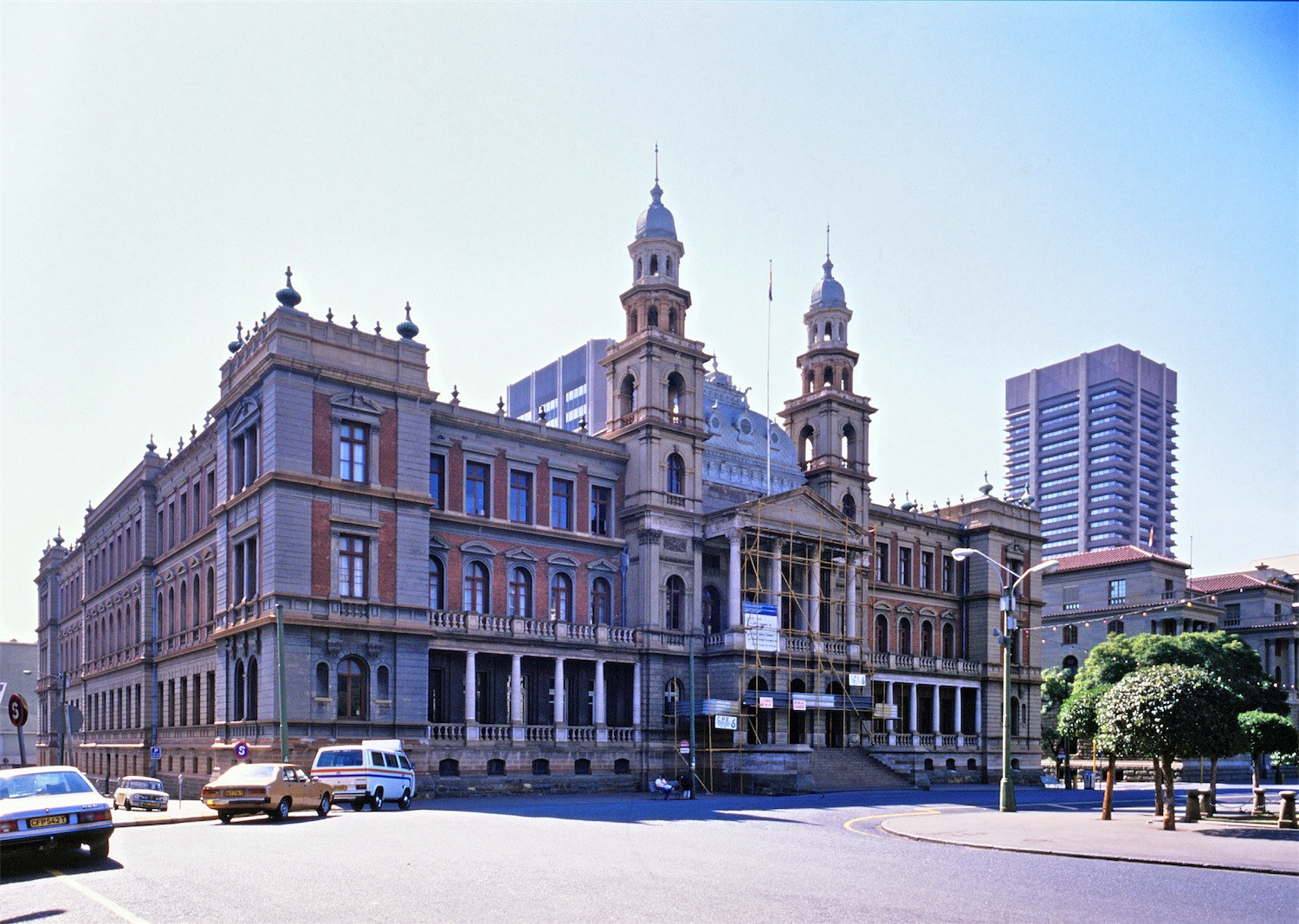
The Palace of Justice in Pretoria (1988), where the latter part of the Delmas Treason Trial was held

Towards the end of 1985, Nkoli and his co-defendants were moved to Modderbee Prison. While discussing a love letter between two male prisoners, some of Nkoli's co-defendants made homophobic comments. Nkoli responded angrily, saying: "You’re actually talking about homosexual men and I am one." His disclosure sparked several weeks of debate among the defendants. Fearing that Nkoli's sexual orientation would damage their public support, some argued that he should be tried separately. Others, including Malindi, supported him. Nkoli argued that homophobia and racism were equally objectionable. Their legal team advised against separate trials and asked the defendants to be nicer to Nkoli. In the end, Nkoli's co-defendants generally became more accepting of his sexual orientation, especially Lekota and Chikane, and they were all tried together.

As news of the trial spread, Nkoli gained supporters in Europe and North America, inspiring anti-apartheid activism, especially in the gay community. A group of Canadians, including Tim McCaskell, founded the Simon Nkoli Anti-Apartheid Committee (SNAAC) in Toronto. The City of London Anti-Apartheid Group campaigned in support of Nkoli during their Non-Stop Picket of the South African Embassy. Nkoli received correspondence from his international supporters, including more than 150 Christmas cards in 1986. He later stated that his global support campaign "helped the ANC to see that a human rights struggle without a gay rights dimension was unacceptable".

GASA declined to support him or advocate for his acquittal and did not make an official statement about his trial until 1986. Exit, a GASA-affiliated newspaper, noted that their lack of support for Nkoli was because he had not been arrested for "gay activities". Because of GASA's behaviour towards Nkoli, the Scottish Homosexual Rights Group (SHRG) and other members of the international gay community advocated for their exclusion from the International Lesbian and Gay Association (ILGA). At ILGA's annual meeting in 1986, GASA representative Kevan Botha made a speech defending his organisation by pointing to Nkoli's murder charge and stating that GASA was apolitical. He also spoke about GASA's "multiracial work". Previously, Nkoli had advocated against ousting GASA from ILGA, but after Botha's speech he openly criticised the organisation. At their 1987 meeting, ILGA suspended GASA's membership, and GASA disbanded soon after.

Court proceedings began in October 1985 and lasted over 420 days, making it one of the longest trials in South African history. Nkoli testified in June 1987. The prosecutors questioned Nkoli about whether he had attended a certain event, and Nkoli responded that he had been at a GASA meeting at the time. He was released on bail the same month. Restricted from working, he was supported financially by SNAAC. The court decided the case in November 1988: Nkoli and ten of his co-defendants were acquitted, while the other eleven were found guilty. The guilty verdicts were overturned the following year.

== Later activism ==
=== GLOW ===
While in prison for the Delmas Treason Trial, Nkoli wrote a letter about his vision for a gay organisation that would be progressive and politically involved. After his release on bail, Nkoli began working with other gay activists to start a new group, founding the Gay and Lesbian Organisation of Witwatersrand (GLOW) in 1988. He met the younger Beverley Palesa Ditsie at an early GLOW meeting and became her friend and mentor. Ditsie served as co-chair with Nkoli and has been credited as co-founding the organisation with Linda Ngcobo.

GLOW, a predominantly Black organisation, included white members. In contrast to GASA, GLOW was politically minded and involved in both the gay rights and anti-apartheid movements. GLOW hosted committees, political rallies, disco nights, newsletters, and a drag competition called Miss GLOW. By the early 1990s, GLOW had multiple branches throughout the Johannesburg area and 1,000 members.

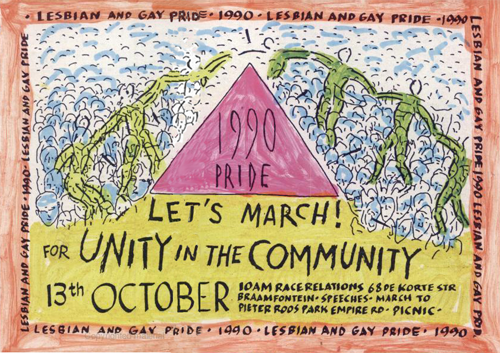
Poster for South Africa's first pride march in October 1990

Negotiations for the end of apartheid began in 1990, and restrictions on protesting were withdrawn. In October, GLOW organised South Africa's first pride march in Johannesburg. According to Edwin Cameron, Nkoli planned the event as both a protest for gay rights and a celebration of gay identity. In Nkoli's speech before the march he said:

I am black and I am gay. I cannot separate the two parts into secondary and primary struggles. In South Africa I am oppressed because I am a black man, and I am oppressed because I am gay. So, when I fight for my freedom, I must fight against both oppressors...With this march gays and lesbians are entering the struggle for a democratic South Africa where everybody has equal rights and everyone is protected by the law: black and white, men and women, gay and straight.

About 800 people marched, while holding hands and chanting slogans. The mood was celebratory. Speeches continued after the march, with Nkoli telling attendees to kiss the person next to them, a potentially criminal act at the time.

External media
- First Johannesburg Pride March, October 1990 on YouTube from GALA Queer Archive

Some white people did not participate due to the march's association with the anti-apartheid movement. In subsequent years, a mostly white Pride Committee began organising the march. GLOW and Nkoli criticised the new organisers as disregarding the concerns of Black members of the community. For example, Nkoli disapproved of afterparty entrance fees which most Black people could not afford. He thought that the parade could not be considered "truly African".

Ngcobo died of AIDS-related causes in 1993. At Ngcobo's memorial services, tensions were present between the homophobic members of his church and the openly gay activists of GLOW. Nkoli gave a eulogy in front of a large GLOW banner, speaking about Ngcobo's activism for gay rights and leading the congregation in call and response.

According to Ditsie, she repeatedly tried to convince GLOW to address lesbian issues, such as corrective rape, but was unsuccessful. Ditsie left GLOW after she was invited to speak at the 1995 UN's World Conference on Women and Nkoli questioned whether participating in the conference would be relevant to the gay rights movement. They were estranged for a few years until Nkoli invited her to a 10th anniversary celebration for GLOW.

=== TAP and HIV/AIDS education ===
Nkoli tested positive for HIV in prison in 1985, two years after the first documented AIDS-related deaths in South Africa. After prison, he began working to educate others about the virus. At the time, HIV was widely considered a "white disease". Existing community efforts to address AIDS mostly served white people, and, according to Nkoli, educational materials in Black South African languages did not exist. In 1989, Nkoli and Peter Busse co-founded the Township AIDS Project (TAP), one of the first organisations to focus on HIV prevention for Black people, especially gay men and those who lived in the townships.

In 1989, Nkoli travelled to more than 25 cities throughout Europe and North America raising money for TAP and speaking about living under apartheid as a Black gay man. His trip included the ILGA conference in Vienna, the Lesbian and Gay Community Services Center in New York City, and a conference at MIT called "From Stonewall to Sharpeville". The tour was coordinated in part by SNAAC and an American group called the National Association of Black and White Men Together.

TAP opened their first office in Soweto the following year. Members of GLOW, including Nkoli and Ditsie, were actively involved in TAP's work. Their efforts were hindered by South African law which, for example, meant they could not show videos about safer sex or use dildos to demonstrate how to use a condom. TAP did not receive funding from the government, but they received donations from foreign groups, including LLH Norway.

Nkoli viewed the "Abstinence, be faithful, use a condom" approach to HIV prevention as ineffective and unnecessarily strict; he instead promoted sex-positive, harm reduction strategies. He used educational materials that normalised safer sex and often showed interracial relationships. In one TAP poster, Nkoli embraces a white man below the phrase: "If you really love him/ Think safer sex". Nkoli publicly announced his HIV diagnosis in 1990, despite his anxiety about doing so, and became one of the first openly HIV-positive Black South Africans. He believed that being visible as someone with HIV would help him educate his community about the virus. According to former TAP director Enea Motaung, Nkoli stated: "for people to know about the disease, I think I must disclose [my status]". Nkoli also founded a support group called the Positive African Men Project.

=== NCGLE and the Constitution ===
Nkoli was instrumental in ensuring that gay rights were enshrined in the South African constitution. His visibility as an openly gay anti-apartheid activist, as well as the relationships he built with other activists during and after the Delmas Treason Trial, increased the acceptance of gay people among anti-apartheid leaders and the larger movement. Additionally, Nkoli lobbied ANC leaders. Lekota stated: "How could we say that men and women like Simon, who had put their shoulders to the wheel to end apartheid, should now be discriminated against?"

In a 1990 meeting with gay activists, ANC lawyer Albie Sachs spoke about Nkoli's contributions to gay rights, stating that "within the ANC it is easier to make a case for lesbian and gay rights when you know it is comrades who are being affected”. Nkoli's 1990 "Open Letter to Nelson Mandela" in the Village Voice, describes the experiences of gay and lesbian people in the townships and references Mandela's stated commitment to "the rights of all people".

In 1994, the interim constitution went into effect and included an "equality clause" prohibiting discrimination based on sexual orientation. To ensure that the equality clause would be included in the final version of the Constitution, a coalition of more than 50 organisations called the National Coalition for Gay and Lesbian Equality (NCGLE) was mobilised by Nkoli, Zackie Achmat, and others. Nkoli lobbied Zak Yacoob and Arthur Chaskalson, two of his Delmas Treason Trial lawyers who were involved in finalising the Constitution. Nkoli, Phumi Mtetwa, and Ian McKellan met with the newly elected President Nelson Mandela as part of an NCGLE delegation in 1995. During the meeting, Mandela reaffirmed the ANC's commitment to gay rights.

The NCGLE's lobbying campaign was successful, and in 1996, South Africa became the first country in the world to explicitly prohibit discrimination against gay people in its constitution. Nkoli and the NCGLE also campaigned against South Africa's anti-sodomy laws, which were repealed in May 1998, several months before his death.

== Death ==
In the last four years of Nkoli's life, he was regularly ill. Effective HIV treatment became available in 1996, but, like many South Africans, Nkoli faced issues with accessing and affording it. In a February 1998 letter to McCaskell, Nkoli wrote about pausing his treatment because of liver damage and depending on a foreign donor to pay for his medication. He vocally criticised the government's response to the HIV/AIDS epidemic and wanted to go on hunger strike. In a 1998 interview, Nkoli advocated for a "fighting campaign" addressing the Department of Health on behalf of people living with AIDS, saying "people are dying anyway without action. Why not die with action?" Nkoli went into a coma and died from AIDS-related illness on 30 November 1998 at Johannesburg General Hospital.

A memorial service was held in Johannesburg at St. Mary's Cathedral on 4 December. Lekota spoke about how Nkoli positively influenced his views of gay people. Achmat urged the audience to take action on behalf of people with AIDS, saying "cry, rage, mobilise. Don't only mourn." On 10 December, Achmat and a small group gathered at St. George's Cathedral to announce the establishment of the Treatment Action Campaign (TAC) to lobby the government to ensure access to HIV medications for all South Africans. On 12 December, Nkoli's funeral was held at the Mphatlalatsane Community Hall in Sebokeng. His coffin was draped in a rainbow flag, red ribbons, and flowers. Molefe, Malindi, Busse, Mtetwa, and others spoke. Nkoli was buried in Sebokeng. In an obituary, Achmat called Nkoli a "gay martyr".

As the ILGA board member for the African region, Nkoli had advocated for the annual conference to be held in South Africa and was a member of the 1999 conference planning committee. The 1999 conference was held in Johannesburg in the year after his death and closed with the 10th annual edition of the pride march. The march was attended by thousands of participants and included a ceremony to name a street corner in Hillbrow after Nkoli.

== Personal life and personality ==
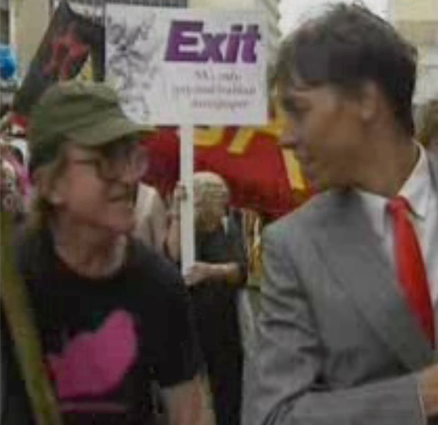
Nkoli's partner Roy Shepherd (L) at South Africa's first pride march in October 1990

At the time of the Delmas Treason Trial, Nkoli was in a relationship with Roy Shepherd. Nkoli met Shepherd, a former Anglican minister, at the Gay Christian Community, a non-denominational Christian meeting group based in Johannesburg. During Nkoli's imprisonment, the two exchanged letters, and their relationship was a source of emotional support for Nkoli. A collection of their letters was published as part of the GALA Queer Archive under the title Till the Time of Trial: The Prison Letters of Simon Nkoli. In the later years of his life, he was in a relationship with Roderick Sharp.

Nkoli liked running and reading. His interest in fashion is evident in his prison letters to Shepherd, in which he describes the clothes he wears and wants. In one letter, he asks Shepherd for a sky-blue Christian Dior or Carducci suit. One obituary said that he wore "a camouflage mini-skirt, jackboots and beret" to gay bars. Others have noted that he liked wearing leather. According to Ditsie, Nkoli had a habit of walking around naked and was "the [freest] human I have ever come across in my whole life". Nkoli has been described as charismatic, creative, and "always laughing, always making jokes". Joy was an important aspect of his activism; for example, the 1990 pride march was both a political protest and a celebration of queer identity. McCaskell said he was "a slight, shy, and fey young man with a ready laugh that concealed an iron determination." Scholar Maya Bhardwaj wrote that Nkoli is known for "not only his militance but also his relentless optimism".

== Legacy ==
=== Influence ===
Nkoli is a gay icon in South Africa and has been called the "gay Mandela". His coming out challenged notions of gayness as not African and of anti-apartheid activists as exclusively heterosexual. His contributions to the anti-apartheid movement as an openly gay man motivated the ANC's leadership to support gay rights. With Nkoli's influence, the gay rights movement in South Africa shifted from being apolitical and white to being anti-apartheid and multi-racial. Through his activism with GLOW and NCGLE, Nkoli contributed to the repeal of anti-gay laws and the inclusion of the equality clause in the Constitution which explicitly protects gay rights. As of 2015, the Johannesburg pride march he founded is an annual event with thousands of participants. However, violence and discrimination against LGBTQ people has persisted, especially for Black members of the community. Additionally, Nkoli's role in the gay rights movement is often highlighted without recognising the contributions of other organisers who worked with him, such as lesbian activists Ditsie and Mtetwa. Nkoli is sometimes credited with founding the first Black gay organisation in South Africa, but that distinction belongs to Alfred Machela who started the Rand Gay Organisation in 1987.

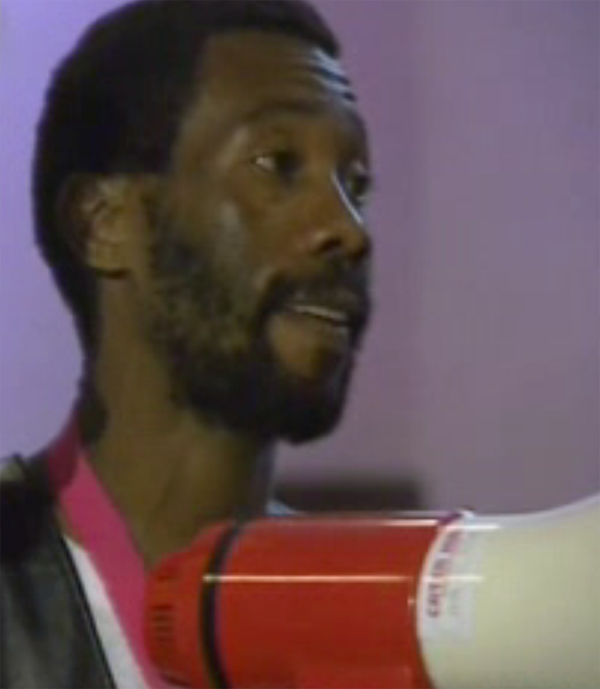
Simon Nkoli at South Africa's first pride march in October 1990

Visibility was an important part of Nkoli's politics and activism, whether by coming out during the Delmas Treason Trial, organising the country's first gay pride march, wearing t-shirts with gay slogans and imagery, or publicly disclosing his HIV diagnosis. Nkoli experienced racism from the gay rights movement and homophobia from the anti-apartheid movement, but he continued to participate in both movements. He emphasised the connections between these movements, as demonstrated by his speech at South Africa's first pride march: "I'm fighting for the abolition of apartheid, and I fight for the right of freedom of sexual orientation. These are inextricably linked with each other. I cannot be free as a black man if I am not free as a gay man."

As one of the first openly HIV-positive African men, Nkoli challenged notions of HIV as an illness affecting only gay white men. He has been credited with influencing other AIDS activists to disclose their status. Nkoli's death contributed to the birth of the Treatment Action Campaign (TAC). He died after facing issues accessing effective HIV/AIDS treatment. Achmat, who also struggled to pay for his own medications, spoke at Nkoli's funeral calling for an organised campaign for treatment access. Soon afterwards, Achmat co-founded TAC. TAC successfully lobbied the government to expand access to HIV treatment.

=== Representation in media ===
Nkoli has been the subject of several films. Canadian filmmaker John Greyson created A Moffie Called Simon (1986) while a member of SNAAC. The short film covers Nkoli's imprisonment and the activism of gay Canadians in solidarity with him. It includes news footage and Nkoli's prison letters with Shepherd and McCaskell. Nkoli and three other deceased South African AIDS activists are featured in Fig Trees (2009), Greyson's hybrid documentary-opera about the AIDS activism of Achmat and McCaskell. Melanie Chait's Out in Africa (1989), South Africa's first film about the gay rights movement, is about Nkoli and another gay anti-apartheid activist named Ivan Toms. Ditsie's Simon & I (2002) is a documentary about her friendship and activism with Nkoli. It includes interviews with people who knew him and footage from GLOW events, including the first pride march.

Gay Xhosa musician Majola released a song in 2017 honouring Nkoli on his album Boet/Sissy. Athi-Patra Ruga created a sculpture called Proposed Model for Tseko Simon Nkoli Memorial which was displayed at Zeitz Museum of Contemporary Art Africa. Conceived by Ruga as a "monument", the golden sculpture depicts a person lying down and covered in jewels and artificial flowers.

Robert Colman's play, Your Loving Simon, focuses on Nkoli's imprisonment during the Delmas Treason Trial and the hundreds of letters he wrote during that time. The play's title is the phrase Nkoli sometimes used to close his letters to Shepherd. First performed in 2003 at Johannesburg's Market Theatre, it features two actors—one in the role of Nkoli and the other as his fictional co-defendant.

The Market Theatre hosted the premiere of another play, Nkoli: The Vogue Opera, in November 2023. Composed by Phillip Miller and S’bo Gyre and directed by Rikki Beadle-Blair, the play was developed in consultation with people who had known Nkoli including his mother, Ditsie, and Heaton-Nicholls. The show is constructed as a vogue dance competition, with every category representing a different scene from Nkoli's life.

=== Honours ===
During Nkoli's post-acquittal speaking tour in 1989, several US cities declared Simon Nkoli Days, including San Francisco, Atlanta, and Manhattan. The following year, Nkoli spoke at the opening ceremony for Gay Games III in Vancouver, Canada. Along with Morris Kight, Nkoli served as Grand Marshal of the 1994 San Diego Pride. In October 1995, Nkoli and Mtetwa were given a Stonewall Equality Award for their gay rights activism. Posthumously, Nkoli was given the Felipa de Souza Award by the International Gay and Lesbian Human Rights Commission.

In the 2010s, the Simon Nkoli Centre for Men's Health provided HIV services at the Chris Hani Baragwanath Hospital in Soweto. On World AIDS Day 2017, Stellenbosch University renamed the building housing their Equality and Disability offices after Nkoli. Two years later, the university's museum held an exhibit about Nkoli entitled: "Black Queer Visibility: Finding Simon". The exhibit was co-hosted by the Simon Nkoli Collective which also sponsors a memorial lecture in Nkoli's name. The annual Feather Awards bestows a Simon Nkoli Award to recognise individuals for their contributions to the LGBTQ community. Winners have included Cameron, David Tlale, Thandiswa Mazwai, and Gloria Bosman. A monument to the defendants in the Delmas Treason Trial was erected at the Delmas Magistrates' Court in 2012.

== Writing ==
- "An Open Letter to Nelson Mandela," Village Voice 35, no. 26 (26 June 1990): 29-30.
- "Wardrobes: Coming out as a black gay activist in South Africa". In Cameron, Edwin; Gevisser, Mark (eds.). Defiant Desire: Gay and Lesbian Lives in South Africa. New York: Routledge, 1995.
- de Waal, Shaun; Martin, Karen (eds.). Till the time of Trial: The prison letters of Simon Nkoli. GALA Queer Archive, 2007.

== See also ==
- Internal resistance to apartheid
- LGBTQ rights in South Africa

== Notes and references ==
=== Works cited ===
- Achmat, Zachie (1998). "The legacy of Simon Nkoli: South African freedom fighter 1957-1998". Gay Community News. 24 (2): 18–21. ProQuest 199329911.
- Barnard-Naudé, Jaco; de Vos, Pierre (2022). "War by Other means: The law and politics of sexual minority freedom in post-apartheid South Africa". Queer Lawfare in Africa (PDF). Pretoria, South Africa: Pretoria University Law Press. p. 27. ISBN 978-1-7764116-8-9.
- Batra, Kanika (2 January 2016). "Worlding Sexualities under Apartheid: From Gay Liberation to a Queer Afropolitanism". Postcolonial Studies. 19 (1): 37–52. doi:10.1080/13688790.2016.1222857. ISSN 1368-8790.
- Bhardwaj, Maya (4 May 2023). "Queertopia's New World Order: Simon Nkoli's Legacy in Queer Black Nightlife Spaces in Johannesburg". Gender Questions. 11 (1). doi:10.25159/2412-8457/11787. ISSN 2412-8457. Archived from the original on 15 April 2025.
- Botes, Jonathan (June 2023). ""We Are Claiming Space, We Are Visible!": The Gay and Lesbian Organisation of the Witwatersrand as a Space of Solidarity, 1980s–1990s". Gender Questions. 11 (1): 1–17. doi:10.25159/2412-8457/12153.
- Botha, Martin P. (15 November 2013). "The Representation of Gays and Lesbians in South African Cinema 1985–2013". Kinema: A Journal for Film and Audiovisual Media. doi:10.15353/kinema.vi.1285. ISSN 2562-5764.
- Brown, Gavin (2024). "Coming out in solidarity: the Non-Stop Picket of the South African Embassy as a space of support and experimentation for queer youth". In Conner, Jerusha (ed.). Handbook on youth activism. Northampton, Massachusetts: Edward Elgar. pp. 183–195. ISBN 9781803923222.
- Carolin, Andy (2021). "Sexual rights and the anti-apartheid movement". Post-Apartheid Same-Sex Sexualities: Restless Identities in Literary and Visual Culture. New York: Routledge. ISBN 9781003030577.
- Chestnut, Mark (24 September 1989). "Out of South Africa". OutWeek – via Yumpu.com.
- Cock, Jacklyn (2002). "Engendering gay and lesbian rights: the equality clause in the south african constitution". Women's Studies International Forum. 26 (1): 35–45. doi:10.1016/S0277-5395(02)00353-9.
- Croucher, Sheila (2016). "South Africa: Opportunities Seized in the Post-Apartheid Era". In Tremblay, Manon; Paternotte, David; Johnson, Carol (eds.). The Lesbian and Gay Movement and the State. New York: Routledge. ISBN 978-1-4094-1067-6.
- Davis, Ken (25 July 2005). Aldrich, Robert; Wotherspoon, Garry (eds.). Who's Who in Contemporary Gay and Lesbian History Vol.2: From World War II to the Present Day. Routledge. ISBN 978-1-134-58313-3.
- de Waal, Shaun; Martin, Karen (2007). "Simon Nkoli's prison letters to Roy Shepherd". Till the time of Trial: The prison letters of Simon Nkoli (PDF). GALA Queer Archive.
- Deb, Basuli (2015). "Inheriting Terror: South African Women, Post-Apartheid Fictions, and Queer Politics". Transnational Feminist Perspectives on Terror in Literature and Culture. Routledge. ISBN 978-1-317-63211-5.
- Devereaux Evans, Tessa (1 May 2024). "Conflict and Coalition: Securing LGBT Rights in the Face of Hostility". Comparative Political Studies. 57 (6): 1035–1067. doi:10.1177/00104140231193012. ISSN 0010-4140.
- Donham, Donald L. (1998). "Freeing South Africa: The "Modernization" of Male-Male Sexuality in Soweto". Cultural Anthropology. 13 (1). ISSN 0886-7356.
- Ellapen, Jordache A. (2021). "Siyakaka Feminism: African Anality and the Politics of Deviance in FAKA's Performance Art Praxis". Feminist Studies. 47 (1). doi:10.1353/fem.2021.0002. ISSN 2153-3873.
- Fowkes, James (2016). Building the Constitution: The Practice of Constitutional Interpretation in Post-Apartheid South Africa. Cambridge Studies in Constitutional Law. Cambridge: Cambridge University Press. ISBN 978-1-107-12409-7.
- Frühstück, Sabine (2014). "Sexuality and the Nation-State". A Global History of Sexuality: The Modern Era. Chichester, UK: John Wiley & Sons. ISBN 978-1405120494.
- Fung, Richard (2013). "John Greyson's Queer Internationalism". In Longfellow, Brenda (ed.). The Perils of Pedagogy: The Works of John Greyson. McGill-Queen's University Press. ISBN 978-0-7735-4143-6. JSTOR j.ctt24hnc5.
- Gevisser, Mark (1995). "A different fight for freedom: A history of South African lesbian and gay organisation from the 1950s to 1990s". Defiant Desire. Routledge.
- Gittings, Chris E. (2013). "Parsing the Transnational in John Greyson's Queer Cinema: Proteus, Fig Trees, Covered, and Hey Elton". In Longfellow, Brenda (ed.). The Perils of Pedagogy: The Works of John Greyson. T McGill-Queen's University Press. pp. 124–125. ISBN 978-0-7735-4143-6. JSTOR j.ctt24hnc5.
- Grebe, Eduard (December 2011). "The Treatment Action Campaign's Struggle for AIDS Treatment in South Africa: Coalition-building Through Networks". Journal of Southern African Studies. 37 (4). doi:10.1080/03057070.2011.608271. ISSN 0305-7070.
- Gunkel, Henriette (2010). "Is Pink really White in South Africa? Reflections on Discourses of Homosexuality in the Post/Apartheid State". The Cultural Politics of Female Sexuality in South Africa. London: Routledge. ISBN 0-203-85603-1.
- Hallas, Roger (2013). "Queer Anachronism and National Memory in Proteus". In Longfellow, Brenda (ed.). The Perils of Pedagogy: The Works of John Greyson. McGill-Queen's University Press. pp. 101–112. p. 463. ISBN 978-0-7735-4143-6. JSTOR j.ctt24hnc5.
- Hayes, Loie (1997). "Simon Nkoli". In Bronski, Michael; Brelin, Christa; Tyrkus, Michael J. (eds.). Outstanding Lives: Profiles of Lesbians and Gay Men. Detroit: Visible Ink Press. ISBN 9781578590087 – via EBSCO.
- Hodes, Rebecca (28 March 2018), "HIV/AIDS in South Africa", Oxford Research Encyclopedia of African History, Oxford University Press, doi:10.1093/acrefore/9780190277734.013.299, ISBN 978-0-19-027773-4
- Imma, Z'étoile (2017). "Black, Queer, and Precarious Visibilities: Simon Nkoli's Activist Image in South Africa's Exit Newspaper". Callaloo. 40 (3): 61–74. doi:10.1353/cal.2017.0120. ISSN 1080-6512.
- Lekota, Patrick Mosiuoa (Terror) (2005). "Address at Simon Nkoli's memorial service, St Mary's Cathedral, Johannesburg, December 1998". In Hoad, Neville Wallace; Martin, Karen; Reid, Graeme (eds.). Sex and Politics in South Africa. Cape Town: Double Storey. ISBN 9781770130159.
- Longfellow, Brenda (2013). "Ten Propositions on Operatic Subversions and the "Charge of the Real" in John Greyson's Fig Trees". The Perils of Pedagogy: The Works of John Greyson. McGill-Queen's University Press. ISBN 978-0-7735-4143-6. JSTOR j.ctt24hnc5.
- Luirink, Bart (2006). "An early expression of how promising things were going to be for change in South Africa". In de Waal, Shaun; Manion, Anthony (eds.). Pride: Protest and Celebration. Jacana Media. p. 32. ISBN 978-1-77009-261-7.
- Majikijela, Lwando (2025). "Simon and I and the prison love letters of Tseko Simon Nkoli as mode of queer vulnerability and resistance". Safundi. doi:10.1080/17533171.2025.2476228. ISSN 1753-3171.
- Martin, Yasmina (October 2015). "The GLOW Collection" (PDF). GALA – Queer Archive.
- ——— (2 July 2020). "'Now I Am Not Afraid': Simon Nkoli, Queer Utopias and Transnational Solidarity". Journal of Southern African Studies. 46 (4): 1–14. Bibcode:2020JSAfS..46..673M. doi:10.1080/03057070.2020.1780022.
- Mbali, Mandisa (29 October 2003). "'Without the luxury of time': AIDS, Representation and the Birth of Rights-based AIDS Activism in the 1980s" (PDF). University of KwaZulu-Natal History and African Studies Seminar. Archived (PDF) from the original on 1 March 2025.
- ——— (2013). South African AIDS Activism and Global health Politics. Palgrave Macmillan. ISBN 9781137312167.
- McCaskell, Tim (2018). Queer Progress: From Homophobia to Homonationalism. Toronto: Between the Lines. ISBN 978-1-77113-279-4.
- McCormick, Tracey Lee (2013). "Queering discourses of coming out in South Africa". Stellenbosch Papers in Linguistics Plus. 42: 127–148. doi:10.5842/42-0-144.
- Mchunu, Khaya (4 May 2023). "The Queer Activism of Simon Nkoli's Clothed and Styled Body". Gender Questions. 11 (1). doi:10.25159/2412-8457/11822. ISSN 2412-8457 – via Sabinet.
- Mchunu, Khaya; Memela, Busisiwe (2022). "Existence Is Resistance: A Reflection on Beverly "Bev" Ditsie's Fashion Performativity". Biography. 45 (3): 249–270. doi:10.1353/bio.2022.0043. ISSN 1529-1456.
- Mkhzie, Nkonzo (2023). ""Kumele bazi ukuthi nathi singa Bantu": Queer African Youth Speaking Back to Harmful Practices in Township Contexts". Gender Questions. 11 (1). doi:10.25159/2412-8457/11924.
- Mntungwa, Melusi; Seti-Sonamzi, Vuyolwethu (2023). "Simon Nkoli and the Legacies of Visibility, Resistance and Solidarity". Gender Questions. 11 (1). doi:10.25159/2412-8457/13538.
- Mohlahledi, Peter (2006). "Sometimes you say the world doesn't accept you, and sometimes it's different!". In De Waal, Shaun; Manion, Anthony (eds.). Pride: Protest and Celebration. Gay and Lesbian Archives of South Africa. Johannesburg, South Africa: Jacana Media. ISBN 9781770092617.
- Mojela, Noko (2023). "The Power of Visibility: A Visual Semiotics Analysis of the 1990 Pride Celebration in South Africa". Gender Questions. 11 (1). doi:10.25159/2412-8457/11917.
- Moyle, Didi (2015). Speaking Truth to Power: The Story of the AIDS Law Project. Johannesburg: Jacana Media. ISBN 978-1-928232-08-7.
- Müller, Brian Michael (2019). "Under Priscilla's eyes: state violence against South Africa's queer community during and after apartheid". Image & Text (33). doi:10.17159/2617-3255/2018/n33a11. ISSN 1021-1497.
- Munro, Brenna M. (2012). "Gay Prison Revisions". South Africa and the Dream of Love to Come: Queer Sexuality and the Struggle for Freedom. U of Minnesota Press. ISBN 978-0-8166-7768-9.
- Murray, Stepen O. (1998). "Sexual Politics in Contemporary Southern Africa". Boy-Wives and Female Husbands: Studies in African Homosexualities. New York, NY: Palgrave. ISBN 0-312-23829-0.
- Nerio, Ron; Halley, Jean (7 June 2022). The Roads to Hillbrow: Making Life in South Africa's Community of Migrants. Fordham University Press. ISBN 978-0-8232-9942-3.
- Nkoli, Simon (1995). "Wardrobes: Coming out as a black gay activist in South Africa". In Cameron, Edwin; Gevisser, Mark (eds.). Defiant Desire: Gay and Lesbian Lives in South Africa. New York: Routledge. doi:10.4324/9781315021782. ISBN 9781315021782.
- Nkoli, Simon (2007). de Waal, Shaun; Martin, Karen (eds.). Till the time of Trial: The prison letters of Simon Nkoli (PDF). GALA – Queer Archive.
- Noonan, Patrick (2003). They're Burning the Churches: The Final Dramatic Events that Scuttled Apartheid. Jacana Media. ISBN 978-1-919931-46-3.
- Oswin, Natalie (March 2007). "Producing Homonormativity in Neoliberal South Africa: Recognition, Redistribution, and the Equality Project". Signs: Journal of Women in Culture and Society. 32 (3). doi:10.1086/510337. ISSN 0097-9740.
- Powers, Theodore (2016). "Knowledge practices, waves and verticality: Tracing HIV/AIDS activism from late apartheid to the present in South Africa". Critique of Anthropology. 37: 27–46. doi:10.1177/0308275X16671788.
- ——— (21 February 2020). Sustaining Life. University of Pennsylvania Press. pp. 53–81. doi:10.9783/9780812296853-005. ISBN 978-0-8122-9685-3.
- Ratele, Kopano; Malherbe, Nick; Cornell, Josephine; Suffla, Shahnaaz (2023). "Masculinities, political organizations and political organizing: Queering anti-apartheid struggle". Routledge Handbook on Men, Masculinities and Organisations (PDF). Routledge.
- Rueedi, Franziska (2021). The Vaal Uprising of 1984 & the Struggle for Freedom in South Africa. Rochester, NY: James Currey. ISBN 978-1-78744-949-7.
- Rydström, Jens (2005). "Solidarity—With Whom? The International Gay and Lesbian Rights Movement and Apartheid". In Hoad, Neville Wallace; Martin, Karen; Reid, Graeme (eds.). Sex and Politics in South Africa. Cape Town: Double Storey. pp. 34–49. ISBN 9781770130159.
- Serrano, José (2014). "La doble salida del closet de Simon Nkoli: 'heterosexismo' y luchas anti-apartheid". Ciudad Paz-Ando. 7 (1): 86–105. doi:10.14483/udistrital.jour.cpaz.2014.1.a05.
- Sharp, Roderick (2006). "Excerpts from speech given by Roderick Sharp at the dedication of the Simon Nkoli Corner, Pride 1999". In De Waal, Shaun; Manion, Anthony (eds.). Pride: Protest and Celebration. Gay and Lesbian Archives of South Africa. Johannesburg, South Africa: Jacana Media. ISBN 9781770092617.
- Spruill, Jennifer (2004). "Ad/Dressing the Nation: Drag and Authenticity in Post-Apartheid South Africa". In Underwood, Lisa (ed.). The Drag Queen Anthology: The Absolutely Fabulous but Flawlessly Customary World of Female Impersonators. New York: Routledge. pp. 103–104. ISBN 978-1-136-56935-7.
- Trengove-Jones, Tim (2006). "Sunday Times, 3 October 1999". In de Waal, Shaun; Manion, Anthony (eds.). Pride: Protest and Celebration. Jacana Media. p. 120. ISBN 978-1-77009-261-7.
- Tsampiras, Carla (April 2014). "Two tales about illness, ideologies, and intimate identities: sexuality politics and AIDS in South Africa, 1980-95". Medical History. 58 (2): 230–256. doi:10.1017/mdh.2014.7. ISSN 2048-8343. PMC 4006140. PMID 24775431.
- Tucker, Andrew; de Swardt, Glenn; McIntyre, James (2015). "How do community-based HIV prevention programmes for men who have sex with men 'travel'? Lessons from the "Ukwazana/Zwakalani" journey in South Africa". Culture, Health & Sexuality. 17 (7/8): 977–989. doi:10.1080/13691058.2015.1018948. ISSN 1369-1058. JSTOR 24741766. PMID 25752360.
- Vargo, Marc E (2011). "An Arrest for Homicide: Simon Nkoli and the Delmas Treason Trial". Scandal: Infamous Gay Controversies of the Twentieth Century. New York: Routledge. ISBN 978-1-56023-411-1.
- Wofford, Jennifer (24 September 1989). "From Sharpeville to Stonewall". Gay community news – via Northeastern University Library Digital Repository.
