= Gay and Lesbian Organisation of the Witwatersrand =

South African NGO

The Gay and Lesbian Organization of Witwatersrand (GLOW) was a non-governmental organization in South Africa that focused on gay and lesbian community issues.

== Origins ==
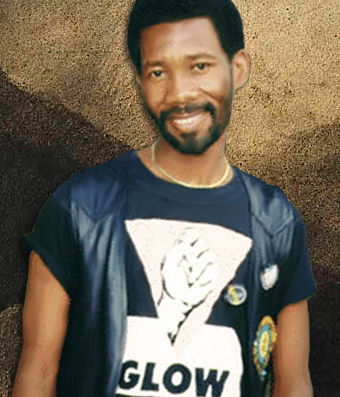
GLOW co-founder Simon Nkoli

On 9 April 1988, black lesbian and gay activists united to form the township-based GLOW in Johannesburg. GLOW's membership primarily consisted of Black Africans, which was uncharacteristic of other gay, lesbian, and bisexual (GLB) groups in South Africa at the time. In particular, they were mostly black, urban, working-class youth from the townships Soweto and KwaThema.

GLOW was formed to fill the void of political anti-apartheid GLB organizing in South Africa and in response to the implicit racism of prominent national organizations like the Gay Association of South Africa (GASA). In Sex and Politics in South Africa, Neville Hoad explains, "GLOW insisted that liberation from homophobia could not be separated from the broader struggle for liberation in South Africa. Simon Tseko Nkoli, Beverley Palesa Ditsie, Peter Busse, and Linda Ngcobo were the founding members of the organization.

Nkoli was the first elected leader of the organization. Nkoli, who also was a well-known activist with the African National Congress (ANC), lead the organization's initiatives to ensure gay and lesbian representation throughout the 1989 thrust for democracy and liberation.On 23 November 2017, the offices of the Equality and Disability units at Stellenbosch University were named for GLOW founder Simon Tseko Nkoli. In 1999, the tenth anniversary of the Pride Parade started by GLOW was held in honor of Simon Tseko Nkoli who died of AIDs the year before. There were 20,000 people in attendance.

GLOW grew to have chapters in Hillbrow, KwaThema, Berea, Soweto, and Yeoville.

In their manifesto, GLOW aligned themselves with the work of the African National Congress (ANC), ushering in a new political process in a way that GLB groups in South Africa had previously refused to do. At the same time, GLOW members also refused to allow GLB issues to take a backseat to democracy and anti-apartheid processes. They championed "Gay rights are human rights". Although members of GLOW collaborated with the ANC, the organization was never officially affiliated with it or any other political party. This autonomy enabled them to challenge and hold all parties accountable for proposing comprehensive GLB reforms and initiatives. For instance, in a 1992 newsletter, GLOW stated its manifesto, calling on all political organizations to stand in solidarity since the GLB fight for freedom could not be separated from the freedom for all South Africans.

"The manifesto calls upon 'All South Africans who are Committed to a Non-Racist, Non-Sexist, Non-Discriminatory Democratic Future' to: UNITE in the fight for the basic human rights of all south Africans, including lesbians and gay men. MOBILIZE against discrimination. ASSERT the role of lesbians and gay men in the current process of political change. CONFRONT South Africa with the presence of its lesbian and gay community. DISPEL myths nurtured by years of discrimination and stereotyping."

The GLOW newsletter was a regular and professional publication begun in 1992 by GLOW to circulate news on black gay political issues and life to membership and other gay communities across the country. Its publication has ceased.

== Activism ==
=== South Africa's first lesbian and gay pride march in Johannesburg ===
GLOW has hosted the annual Lesbian and Gay Pride March in Johannesburg since 1990, an opportunity to safely display GLB culture in public on a large scale. It was the first pride parade in South Africa. It was also the first pride march on the African continent.

Participants had the option to cover their faces with brown paper bags for fear of persecution and the parade was planned to conclude with a kiss-in. It began with 1,000 marchers on 10 October 1990 and by the next year, participation doubled to 2,000 marchers. The march takes place every October on the second Saturday and begins at the University of Witwatersrand.

Divisions across race, gender, class, and sexual orientation continue to plague GLB organizing. Most of the marchers have been white men. However, the presence of black and coloured men and women is increasing and the continued growth of the pride march to 25,000 people in 2001 and around 20,000 in 2018 is indicative of an increasingly more inclusive gay identity in South Africa. Lisa Underwood in The Drag Queen Anthology explains that "the [pride] march is unique in South Africa, in that it is simultaneously angry and carnivalesque."

=== Lesbian Forum ===
At a time when many of the GLB organizations in South Africa were predominantly male and centered on the issues of men, the Lesbian Forum of GLOW was conceived of as a safe place for women and femme-identified members. One of the major challenges of the forum was the division between participants who needed social support and those who were committed to the imperative political issues. Because there were no other spaces like this one for young black lesbians to receive support, members had no choice but to attempt to address social issues, such as mental health, suicide, and social isolation, sometimes to the neglect of expressly political concerns. The Lesbian Forum published their own newsletter separate from the GLOW newsletter and it was titled "Wet Velvet" which featured a herstory of lesbian activism in this region of South Africa.

=== Miss GLOW competitions ===
This annual drag show was organized by founding GLOW member Linda Ngcobo. It was a major event for the gay community of the townships across South Africa, attracting hundreds of people annually. The Miss GLOW Competitions, begun in the KwaThema township as the Miss KwaThema GLOW Drag Competition, were symbolic of the new openness of gay liberation in South Africa leading up to the first Pride March. The individual chapters of GLOW would hold their own competitions and the winner of each would go on to compete in the national Miss GLOW finals. The first Miss GLOW competition was held in Soweto in 1988. The Annual Miss GLOW competition was often linked to the Annual General Meetings to attract wider attendance and participation for the less popular political and organizational activity. Cross-dressing is still a mainstay in township culture and drag shows continue to be a popular event for homosexual and heterosexual members of these communities alike.

=== Soweto Township AIDS Project (TAP) ===
As the problem of HIV/AIDS continued to worsen quality of life across South Africa, members of GLOW helped to launch to Soweto Township Aids Project in 1990. Here, they were instrumental in bringing visibility to the problem as well as distributing education and resources in promotion of safe sex to stop the spread of the disease.

=== Gay rights workshops ===
GLOW hosted a workshop titled "Lesbian and Gay Rights are Human Rights" at the University of Witwatersrand in collaboration with the Organization of Lesbian and Gay Activist's (OLGA) campaign for a Charter of Lesbian and Gay Rights in South Africa. The workshop was chaired by Kim Berman and featured a presentation from lawyer Edwin Cameron on the contours of the constitution making process. This presentation assisted community members and organization members in understanding the language of the ANC constitution and how it could be utilized to support their claim to lesbian and gay rights as human rights. This workshop was a follow-up to a community questionnaire GLOW sent out to determine which rights people deemed most important to be included in the Charter.

=== Advocating for gay rights in South Africa's constitution ===
In September 1990, OLGA submitted a proposal to the ANC Constitutional Committee for a bill of rights that "protects the fundamental rights of all citizens and guarantees equal rights for all individuals, irrespective of race, colour, gender, creed or sexual orientation." It was endorsed by GLOW.

This proposal garnered international attention. British human rights campaigner and journalist Peter Tatchell reached out in support of GLOW's work. He documented their activism in UK publications and shared with them examples of how other countries have incorporated gay rights into their constitution. In 1995 Beverley Palesa Ditsie was invited to advocate for lesbian rights at the United Nations Beijing International Conference on Women.

These actions bolstered the demand for the inclusion of gay rights in the constitution and ultimately resulted in the non-negotiable inclusion of gay rights in the ANC constitution and the initiatives of various other political parties. In 1996 South Africa became the first post-colonial government in the world to incorporate "sexual orientation into the non-discrimination clause". Unfortunately, this legislation still didn't reflect the attitudes of the broader population toward GLB identified citizens.

=== Combating ANC homophobia ===
In 1991, Winnie Mandela was found guilty of kidnapping and beating four young men from Soweto in 1988. Her defense throughout the trial rested on the claim that she was "saving black youths from the homosexual advances of white Methodist minister Paul Verryn." She both explicitly and implicitly asserted that homosexuality was abnormal. These homophobic remarks were preceded by those of Ruth Mompati, who similarly stated that gay people were not oppressed. Mompati's comments assumed that only white South Africans were or could be gay, thereby implying, like Mandela, that "homosexuality was a condition alien to the black community."

Due to protesting by GLB groups of these remarks, the ANC inserted a clause banning discrimination on the basis of sexual orientation into a draft of the Bill of Rights in 1991. This clause, however, did not lead the ANC to condemn Winnie Mandela's homophobic remarks later that year.

In response to this inaction and Mandela's subsequent reinstallation within the ANC, GLOW members protested the trial and produced an "angry open letter" demanding the ANC take seriously its commitment to sexual equality. It was sent to the National Executive Committee of the ANC and published in the national press. The letter addressed the harmful homophobic displays outside of the courtroom, the conflation of homosexuality with sexual abuse, and the use of homophobia as a strategy to deflect attention away from the real issues. Following this letter, GLOW announced a campaign calling for public support of the letter from other GLB and political groups and requesting that local and international organization stand by their commitment to gay rights in South Africa's democratic future.

== Challenges and controversy ==
Sexism has been cited as an issue within GLOW. The issues of lesbian and bisexual members are relatively invisible. More concretely, when founding member and co-chair Palesa-Ditsie was called to represent GLOW as a gay rights activist at the UN, male members of the organization opposed the action, fearing that a woman at the forefront of the party would take attention away from the more pressing gay issues. Subsequently, Palesa-Ditsie feared for her life following her visibility in the pride parade. She had been targeted for corrective rape by heterosexual male members of her community and hoped to bring issues such as this to light when speaking at the UN Conference on Women in Beijing.

The division between activism and support posed a challenge to setting an agenda that satisfied all members while advancing the aims of the organization. The activism work was most accessible to and engaged by the white and middle- to upper-class members, while the majority black and working-class members were attracted to the organization for its safe spaces and opportunities to "meet friends and romantic partners." The intellectual language of activism intimidated less educated and uneducated members of the organization, while the poverty of black members was a detriment to their involvement with GLOW's political working groups.

Most of GLOW's organizational budget went toward planning the annual pride march, which made it difficult to fund and sustain more small-scale projects aimed at improving gay life in the townships. Critics of the group point out that even though the majority of GLOW members are from the townships, the gay community of the townships remains unorganized.

Although the organizing efforts of GLOW contributed to historic legislative, political, and social victories, in South Africa today homophobia persists and continues to threaten the livelihood of the GLB community. The continued success of the GLB movement has relied on the strategic linking of homophobia with apartheid and the anti-discrimination clause of the constitution to make gains in GLB rights where there isn't ample public support. A 2003 study found that homosexuals still rank as the third most hated group in South Africa and 40.9% of the population reported "disliking homosexuals very much."

Although the pride marches bring necessary media attention to the presence and issues of the Black South African community, organizers worry that there is too much emphasis placed on the spectacle of the event for onlookers and thus the issues are not taken seriously. For this reason, participants and organizers have debated the role of drag queens in the parade. Some argue that drag queens are integral to the GLB community and have a right to be included, while others argue that they draw the wrong kind of attention to what has the potential to be a serious political demonstration. Additionally, concerns about respectability from more conservative GLB groups has also been a point of debate. What began as a political demonstration in 1990 is now seen as more of a party. The 2012 pride was characterized by a clash that made activists reflect on the history of pride in South Africa and how the event has evolved over time. At the same time, today's organizers believe that in order to maximize attendance the event must be depoliticized.

== Related organizations ==
=== Gay and Lesbian Organization of Pretoria (GLO-P) ===
The Gay and Lesbian Organization of Pretoria was formed in 1993 and modeled after GLOW. What originally began as a social group, however, over time became a provider and facilitator of community resources. These resources included the Pretoria Gay and Lesbian Resource Centre, various types of counseling and information service, identity formation workshops, resource directory, gay map of Pretoria, and a gay issues research forum. GLO-P became known as OUT-GLB Wellbeing in 2001.

=== The National Coalition for Gay and Lesbian Equality (NCGLE) ===
Sensing the dissolution of GLOW in 1994, Simon Nkoli and many other former GLOW members went on to form The National Coalition for Gay and Lesbian Equality (NCGLE). NCGLE lobbied and collaborated with the ANC Constitutional Assembly to incorporate language and protections for gay rights in the new South African constitution. Through this organization, sodomy in South Africa was also officially decriminalized. NCGLE challenged the constitutionality of anti-sodomy laws post-apartheid in the South African Constitutional court and won their case. NCGLE is now an NGO known as the Gay and Lesbian Equality Project.

=== Hope and Unity Metropolitan Community Church (HUMCC) ===
The Hope and Unity Metropolitan and Community Church (HUMCC) was an outgrowth of GLOW. In 1994, it became a safe space for the GLB community to fuse their sexual identities with their religious identities.

=== Nkateko ===
In 1995, Beverley Palesa Ditsie and other members of GLOW left to form Nkateko in response to the invisibility of black lesbian issues and the dominance of white men and women in GLOW. The primary issues discussed were homelessness, 'coming out', violence, and homophobia. The organization's rapid growth without the necessary organizational structure to sustain itself resulted in the group's demise after the 1997 pride parade.
