= Beverley Palesa Ditsie =

South African activist

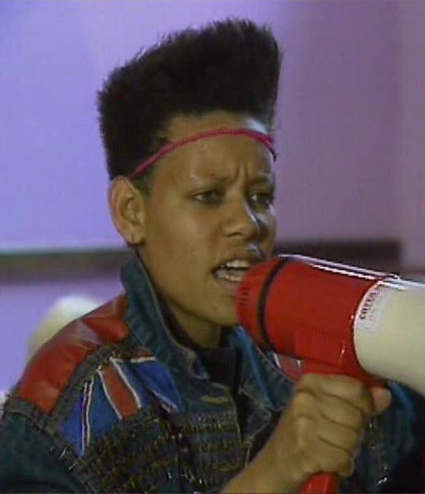
Ditsie at the first pride march in South Africa, 1990.

Beverley Palesa Ditsie (born 1971) is a South African lesbian activist, artist, and filmmaker. Ditsie is one of the founders of the gay rights organization Gay and Lesbian Organization of Witwatersrand.

In speaking about the importance of considering LGBT rights in the context of human rights at the 4th UN World Conference on Women in Beijing in 1995, she became the first openly lesbian woman to do. It was also the first time that the United Nations was addressed about LGBT issues, with Ditsie saying, "if the world conference on women is to address the concerns of all women, it must similarly recognise that discrimination based on sexual orientation is a violation of basic human rights".

== Biography ==
Beverly Ditsie was born in November 1971 and grew up in the neighborhood Orlando West, Soweto, South Africa.

Ditsie's resistance to rigid gender roles began early. She was inspired by her mother, Eaglette Ditsie, a well-known touring singer and actress who introduced her to film sets. When her mother got a starring role in a TV show, producers needed a child actor who looked like her. They thought Ditsie was a boy and cast her as her mother's on-screen son. She embraced these role, later saying she felt more herself in those moments than at any other time.

On her 16th birthday, Ditsie hosted a coming-out party that marked a turning point in her life. During the celebration, a friend told her about Simon Tseko Nkoli, an openly gay anti-apartheid activist who had recently been acquitted in the Delmas treason trial after facing the death penalty alongside 21 other political leaders.

After attending one of Simon Nkoli's meetings at Wits University, Ditsie quickly recognised the absence of LGBTQ+ issues within the anti-apartheid struggle. Nkoli became her mentor, introducing her to Black feminist thinkers such as Audre Lorde and Barbara Smith. Together with Nkoli and Linda Ngcobo, she co-founded the Gay and Lesbian Organisation of the Witwatersrand (GLOW), which played a key role in securing constitutional protection for LGBTQ+ rights in South Africa's 1996 Constitution.

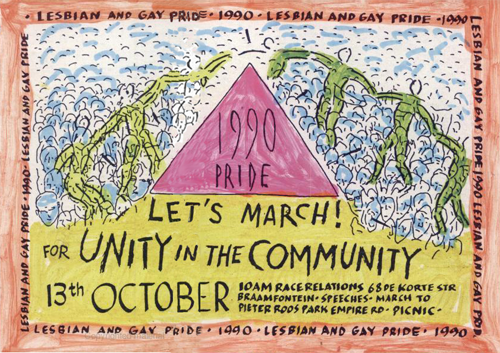
Poster for Africa's First-Ever Pride March — Johannesburg, 1990

In 1990, GLOW organised South Africa's first Pride march, the first Pride on the African continent, attracting more than 800 participants despite initial fears of violence. For Ditsie, the event was a moment of profound liberation, though it brought serious threats to her once it was televised.

Her international impact grew in 1995, when she addressed the UN World Conference on Women, delivering the first speech at the United Nations to call for LGBTQ+ rights as human rights.

Seeking to bring visibility beyond political spaces, she later joined the reality TV series Livewire – Communities, confronting homophobia publicly and engaging directly with viewers. The emotional toll of activism was significant, particularly after Nkoli's death from AIDS in 1998; Ditsie honoured him in her 2002 documentary, Simon and I.

Ditsie has remained a steadfast voice for intersectional justice, calling out global inequalities and defending trans rights. She centres queer women of color in the struggle and insists that true liberation is only possible when the most marginalized are free.

In 2019, Claremont Graduate University in California awarded her the title of Doctor of Humane Letters for her work.

Alongside her activism, she keeps one personal goal: making sure Boy George knows the impact he had on her life. In 2020, Boy George paid tribute to her in the song "Rainbow in the Dark."

On 10 September 2022, Ditsie married Nicole, who chose to take her surname.

Thirty-five years after South Africa's first Pride, Dr Beverly Ditsie called for a boycott of Joburg Pride 2025, criticising its drift towards sponsorship and spectacle at the expense of its activist roots.

Through the House of Ditsie, which she co-founded with Nicole, she supports a series of community-led events that contributes to renew discussions on the legacy and future of queer liberation in South Africa, across the African continent, and internationally.

== Activism ==
Ditsie is one of the organizers of the first Pride March in South Africa. The parade took place in Johannesburg in 1990. Ditsie and her friend, Simon Nkoli, another activist, worked together on creating the pride event after Simon had the idea from his visit to America. During the event, she spoke on live TV, becoming a "cultural icon" and also a target for people's hatred and bigotry. She states that she had to be "escorted for about two weeks after the pride march" for her safety. Ditsie is critical of current pride activities because she sees a cultural and racial divide between LGBT people in South Africa.

Ditsie spoke at the United Nations Conference on Women in 1995, and was the person to address gay and lesbian rights before a U.N. 4th World Conference on Women." She attempted to convince U.N. delegates to "adopt resolutions recognizing sexual diversity."

== Film and television career ==
Ditsie has worked as an actress and director in television since 1980, making her the first black female child star in television.

In the late 1990s, she was in the reality show Livewire - Communities, and was the only black lesbian on the show.

She has also written, directed and consulted in over 20 Documentaries, screened nationally and internationally. Her first documentary film, Simon and I (2001), won a number of Audience Awards, including the 2004 Oxfam/Vues d' Afrique best documentary, Montreal, Canada. The story of Simon and I is autobiographical, following her "personal and political journey" with Nkoli. Her film uses both interviews and archival material.

== Filmography ==
- Simon & I (2002, co-directed with Nicky Newman)
- A Family Affair (2005, directed and written)
- The Commission - From Silence to Resistance (2017, directed, produced and written)
- Lesbians Free Everyone - The Beijing Retrospective (2020, directed, produced and written)
