= Kim Berman =

South African artist

- Born: 1960 (age 64–65)
- Citizenship: South Africa
- Education: Tufts University (MFA)
- Occupation: Artist

Kim Berman (born 1960) is a South African artist.

Berman received a BFA from the University of the Witwatersrand before pursuing her MFA at Tufts University. She taught at the School of the Museum of Fine Arts, Boston from 1988 until 1992, and facilitated workshops through much of the remainder of the 1990s. Later in her career she returned to South Africa, where she has been involved in the development of collaborative printmaking projects. Currently director of the Artist Proof Studio in Newtown, Johannesburg, she has worked a senior lecturer in the fine arts department of the Technikon at the University of the Witwatersrand and at the University of Johannesburg. A 1999 suite of prints by Berman in mezzotint, drypoint, and engraving on paper, titled Playing Cards of the Truth Commission, an Incomplete Deck, is currently owned by the National Museum of African Art, as is the 1997 artists' book Emandulo Re-Creation, to which she contributed as a member of the Artist Proof Studio. A 2001 print, Break the Silence, is in the collection of the Museum of Modern Art.
