= Forest Town =

Forest Town may refer to:

- Forest Town, Gauteng, South Africa
- Forest Town, Nottinghamshire, England
- Forest Town Hall, Belgium
