= Villa Beau-Site =

Historic Art Nouveau house in Brussels, Belgium

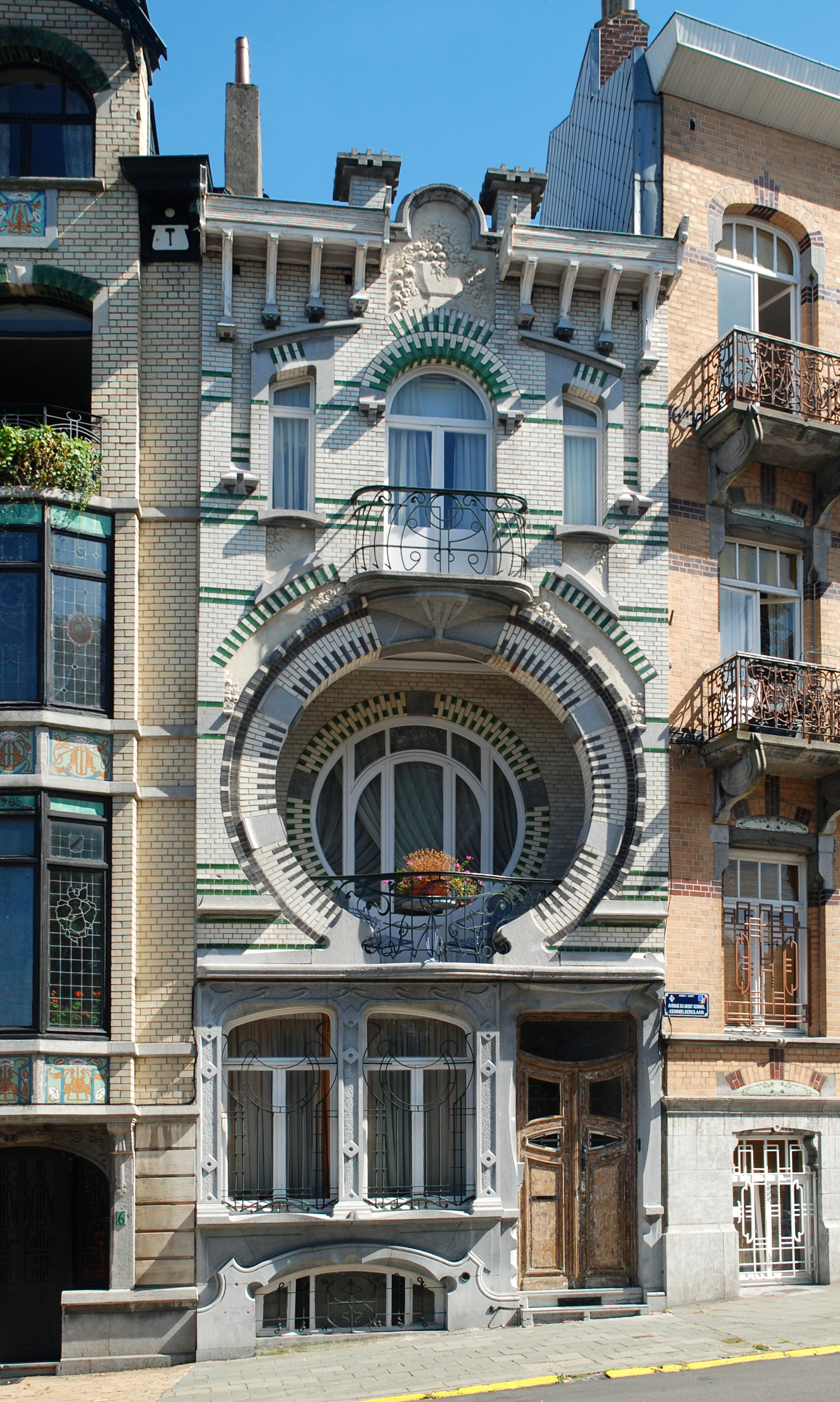
- The Villa Beau-Site (centre) with its two neighbours
- Interactive map of the Villa Beau-Site area
- Alternative names: Nelissen House

General information
- Type: Town house
- Architectural style: Art Nouveau
- Location: Avenue du Mont Kemmel / Kemmelberglaan 5, 1190 Forest, Brussels-Capital Region, Belgium
- Coordinates: 50°49′19″N 4°20′27″E
- Completed: 1905
- Client: Arthur Nelissen

Design and construction
- Designations: Protected (23/02/2006)

The Villa Beau-Site, also known as the Nelissen House (French: Maison Nelissen; Dutch: Huis Nelissen), is a historic town house in Brussels, Belgium. It was built in 1905, in Art Nouveau style, as the private residence of the Dutch-born architect Arthur Nelissen and his wife, soon after their wedding. It was classified as a protected monument in 2006. It is located at 5, avenue du Mont Kemmel/Kemmelberglaan in the municipality of Forest.

== Building ==
The building's unusually narrow façade, measuring under 5 metres (16 ft), is richly decorated. The ground floor, in sinuous Art Nouveau style, has an asymmetrical layout and is made of blue stone with original, elaborate wrought iron details. The first floor is dominated by a large horseshoe arch that perforates the façade, giving way to a small loggia. Behind the loggia, another horseshoe arch frames the window opening. The top floor contains a small wrought iron balcony, and the very top of the façade is adorned with a bas-relief depicting a vase of flowers. The façade is mainly made of brick: white bricks cover most of its surface, while green bricks and blue stone have been used to highlight the arch and other features. In 1920, decoration in the form of stylised roses was added between the first and second floors.

Inside, the building preserves its original floor plan. It forms part of a row of homogeneous town houses, built between 1904 and 1910 in eclectic styles, overlooking Forest Park.

The building bears certain similarities to the Saint-Cyr House, designed by the architect Gustave Strauven and also located in Brussels. The official list of Brussels' architectural heritage describes the building's façade as "remarkable" and the art historian Cécile Dubois has described the building as "a stunning architectural gem".

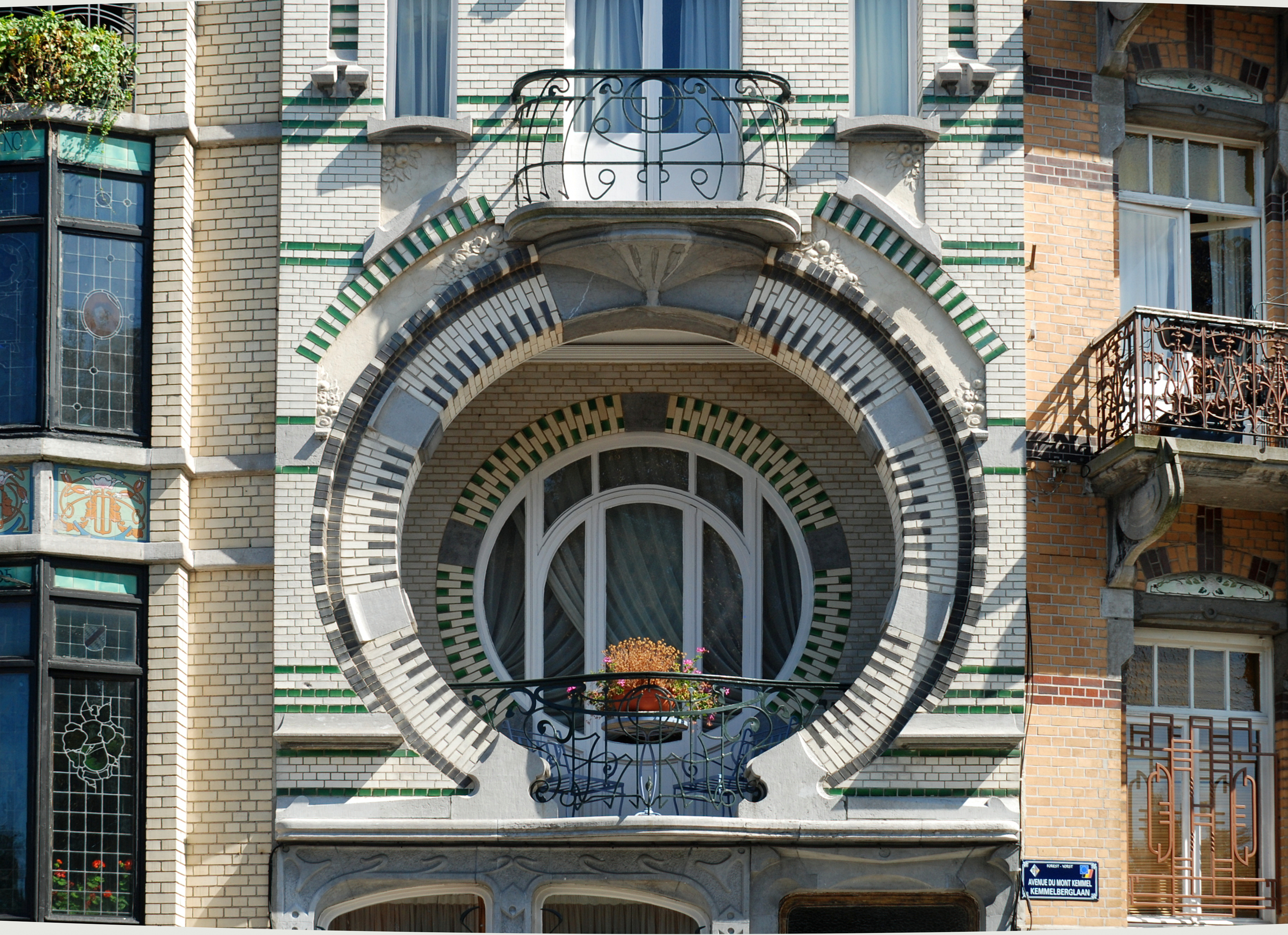
Bay window on the first floor

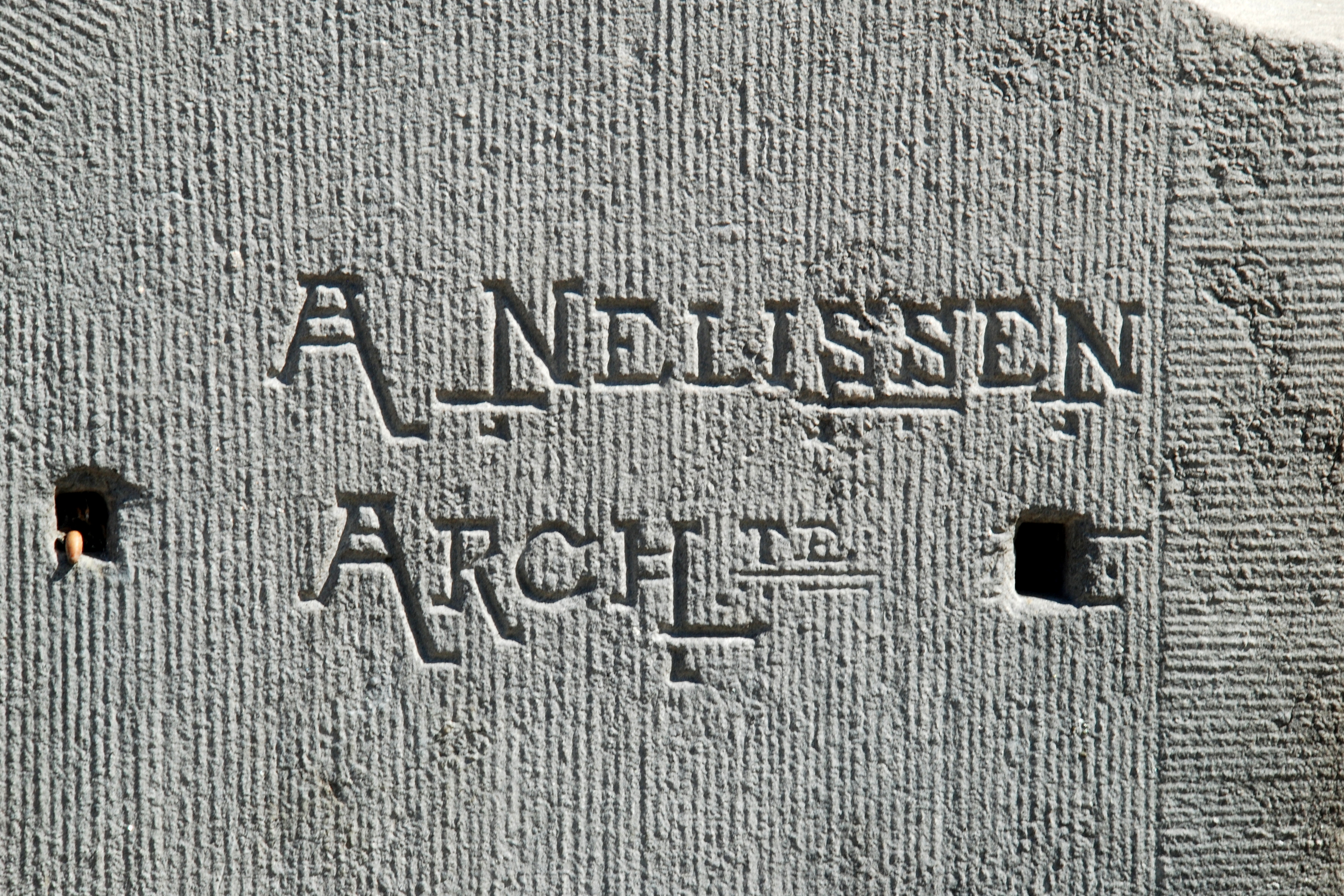
The architect's signature

== See also ==
- Art Nouveau in Brussels
- History of Brussels
- Culture of Belgium
- Belgium in the long nineteenth century
