= Joburg Contemporary Art Foundation =

- Established: 2020
- Location: 1 Durris Road; Forest Town; Johannesburg
- Coordinates: 26.1744°S 28.0330°E
- Type: Art Museum
- Curator: Clive Kellner
- Website: jcaf.org.za

The Joburg Contemporary Art Foundation (JCAF) positions itself as “an academic research institute, a platform for museum-quality exhibitions and an innovative approach to knowledge creation”. Admission to JCAF is free and by appointment only by booking on JCAF's website. This non-collecting contemporary art foundation is located in Forest Town, Johannesburg, South Africa. JCAF is situated close to Johannesburg Zoo and the Johannesburg Holocaust and Genocide Centre. It opened in 2020 and is housed in a heritage site that underwent an extensive renovation to meet the needs of the foundation. The foundation focuses on exhibiting art and artists from the Global South.

== History ==
The premises wherein the JCAF hold their museum exhibitions has a Johannesburg Heritage Foundation Blue Plaque which recognizes the building as a heritage site. The building was previously an electrical tram shed that formed part of the tram network in Johannesburg between 1906 and 1961. The former tram shed underwent a 3-year renovation to transform it into the foundation's physical home. The foundation officially opened in 2020 with a lecture by the anthropologist, Arjun Appadurai.

=== Exhibitions ===
Exhibitions are curated according to a theme, and supported by a public programme that includes lectures, talks, performances and podcasts. Each theme is accompanied by a journal that follows a structured research methodology. The JCAF Journal is available for free online.

The inaugural exhibition, Contemporary Female Identities in the Global South, was postponed due to the COVID-19 pandemic, and eventually opened to the public in September 2020. The exhibition featured renowned artists such as Bharti Kher, Wangechi Mutu, Nandipha Mntambo, Shirin Neshat and Berni Searle. It was the first of three exhibitions, curated under the theme, Female Identities in the Global South. The second exhibition, Liminal Identities in the Global South (2021), featured works by Searle, Jane Alexander, Lina Bo Bardi, Lygia Clark, Kamala Ibrahim Ishaq, Kapwani Kiwanga, Ana Mendieta, Lygia Pape and Sumayya Vally. The final exhibition, Kahlo, Sher-Gil, Stern: Modernist Identities in the Global South opened in 2022, featuring works by Frida Kahlo, Amrita Sher-Gil and Irma Stern.

JCAF's second research theme, Worldmaking (2024-2026), is explored through a trilogy of exhibitions – Ecospheres (2024), Structures (2025), and Reverse Futures (2026) – and an accompanying series of talks and publications that consider the kind of world we want to inhabit and leave behind. Worldmaking refers to the ways we collectively make the spaces around us that we inhabit through symbolic practices.
