= Michele Bruno =

South African drag queen and hairdresser

- Born: 1941
- Died: 2016 (aged 74–75)
- Occupations: Drag queen; hairdresser

Michele Bruno (1941-2016) was a South African drag queen and hairdresser. Bruno lived in Johannesburg and came to perform drag in the 1960s. He was the first Miss Gay South Africa in 1969.

== Biography ==
Bruno was born in 1941, and his parents were Italian immigrants to South Africa. By 1960, Bruno was performing as a drag queen, though his day job was working as a hairdresser in Johannesburg. Bruno used male pronouns and was considered "gender-variant."

In 1960, Bruno was involved in the first commercial drag show at the Jewish Guild Theatre. Bruno received some infamy after being arrested for "masquerading as a woman" in the 1966 Forest Town raid. Bruno's name, along with other attendees, was printed in the paper. In 1969, Bruno was named the first Miss Gay South Africa.

Bruno continued to work as a hairdresser until his death in 2016. He was one of the subjects of an exhibition at Museum Africa, "Joburg Tracks." A 1997 oral history by Bruno and an archive of materials saved by Bruno are part of the Gay and Lesbian Memory in Action (GALA) collection.
