= Forest Municipal Hall =

Municipal hall building in Forest, Belgium

- Hôtel communal de Forest (French); Gemeentehuis van Vorst (Dutch)
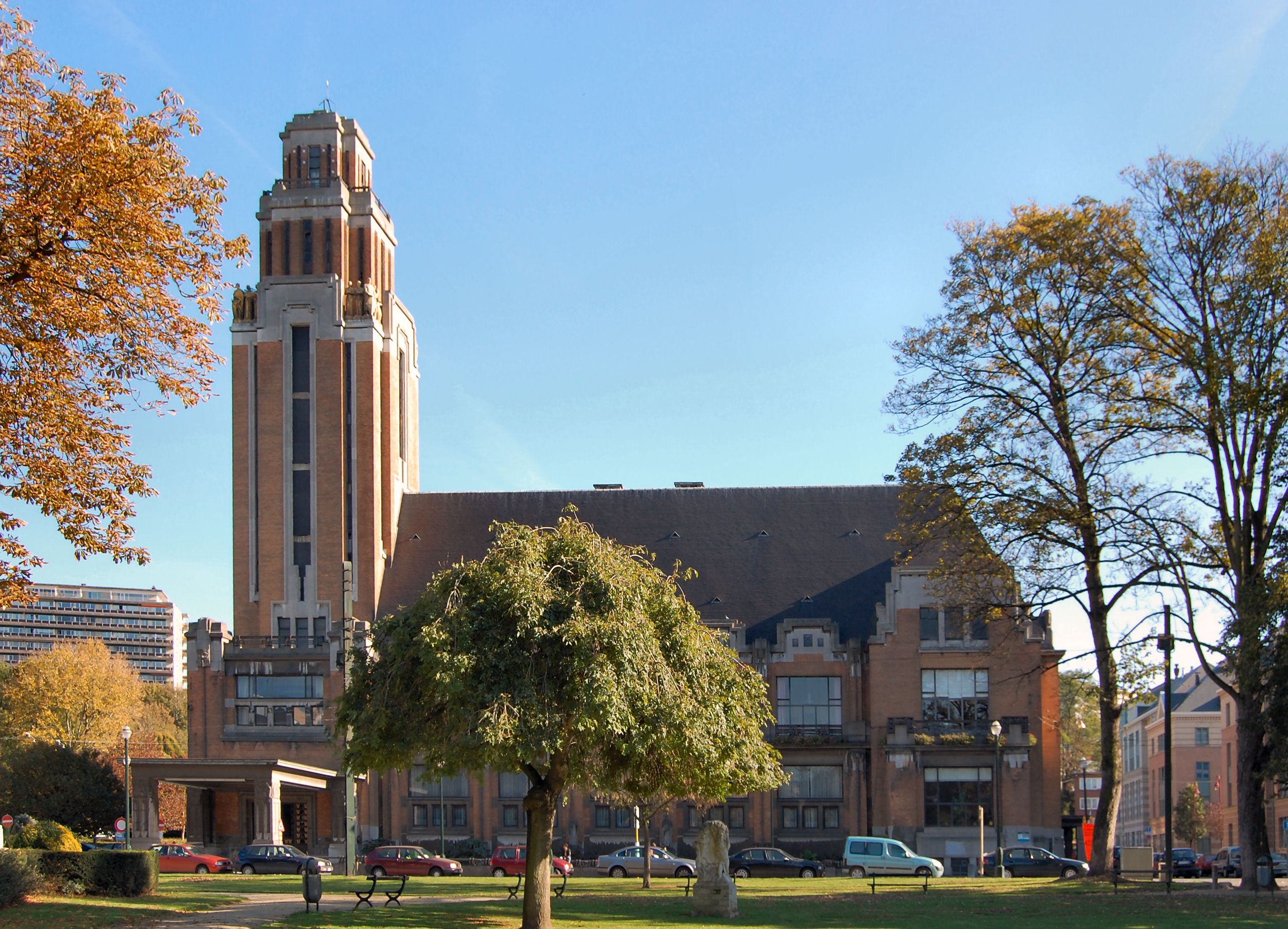
- Forest's Municipal Hall
- Interactive map of the Forest Municipal Hall area

General information
- Type: Municipal hall
- Architectural style: Art Deco
- Location: Rue du Curé / Pastoorsstraat 2, 1190 Forest, Brussels-Capital Region, Belgium
- Coordinates: 50°48′41″N 4°19′9″E
- Construction started: 1935
- Completed: 1938

Design and construction
- Architect: Jean-Baptiste Dewin

The Municipal Hall (French: Hôtel communal; Dutch: Gemeentehuis) of Forest is the municipal hall building and the seat of that municipality of Brussels, Belgium. Built between 1935 and 1938, and qualified as a prototype of Brussels' Art Deco, this building illustrates the leading role the style played in public architecture during the interwar period.

== History ==
=== Inception and construction ===
In the aftermath of World War I, the municipal authorities of Forest wanted to build a municipal hall representative of its status as a flourishing suburb of Brussels. It was originally planned to build it on the site of the current Royale Union Saint-Gilloise Stadium in the Duden Park district but, after much discussion, it was decided to erect it instead on the grounds of the previous Municipal Hall, a neoclassical building dating from 1828, and in the place of a previous parsonage from 1734.

The current Municipal Hall was designed by the architect Jean-Baptiste Dewin in 1925, and the municipal council approved the final plans in 1931. The first stone was officially laid on 19 May 1935 and the building was inaugurated on 9 July 1938. The building has important interior and exterior decorations made by such artists as Victor Rousseau, Georges Baltus, Canneel, Stoffyn and Tricot.

=== Damage and protection ===
During World War II, the Municipal Hall suffered from bombings in Forest that lead to serious damage to the façade and the entrance portal to the Chaussée de Bruxelles/Brusselsesteenweg.

On 22 October 1992, the exterior, interior and furniture of the building were classified as protected cultural monuments by the Royal Commission for Monuments and Landscapes. Forest's Municipal Hall is also listed as protected immovable heritage by the Department of Monuments and Landscapes of the Brussels-Capital Region.

== Architecture ==
The asymmetrical Municipal Hall has a sleek geometric design with a tower on the side. The façades are made of small orange bricks and are adorned with stylised statues.

=== Tower ===
The building is dominated by the tall silhouette of the tower, symbol of municipal freedoms and the independence of municipal power from the clergy. Placed asymmetrically with respect to the main building, this multi-storey tower is adorned with large copper-sheeted statues. They are gilded with gold leaf and are the work of the sculptors Jacques Marin and Marnix d'Haveloose.

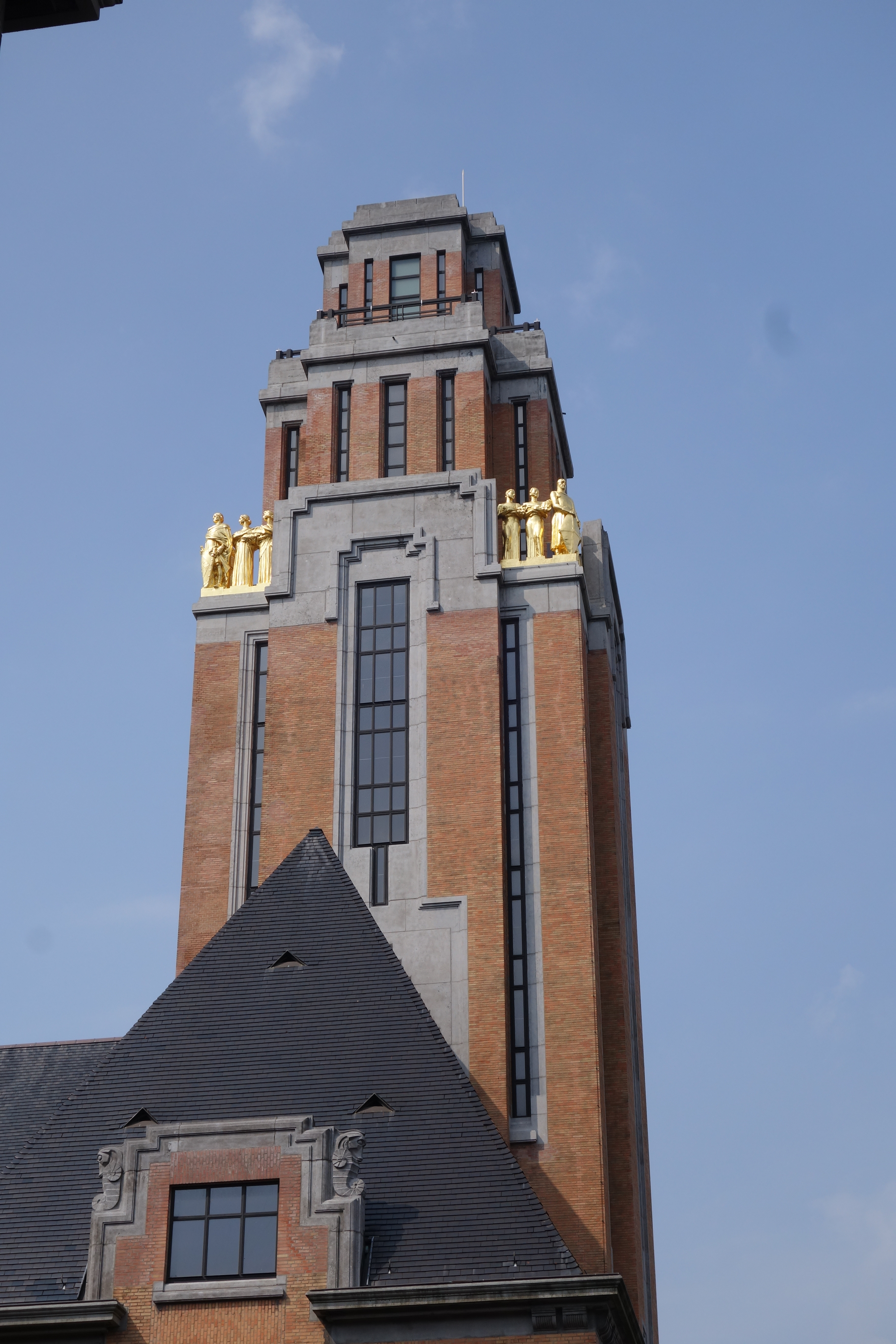
Overview of the tower

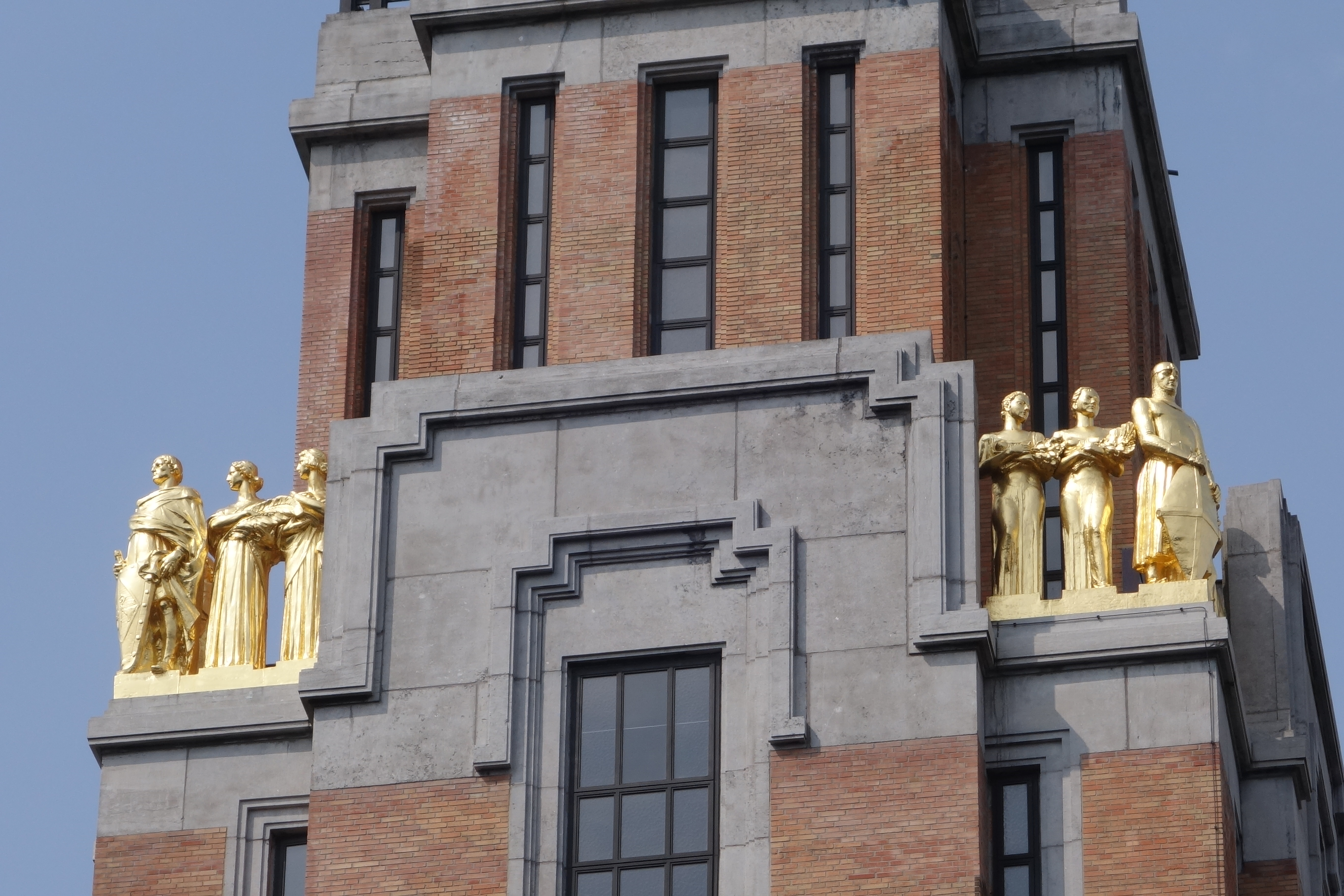
View of the tower's sculptures

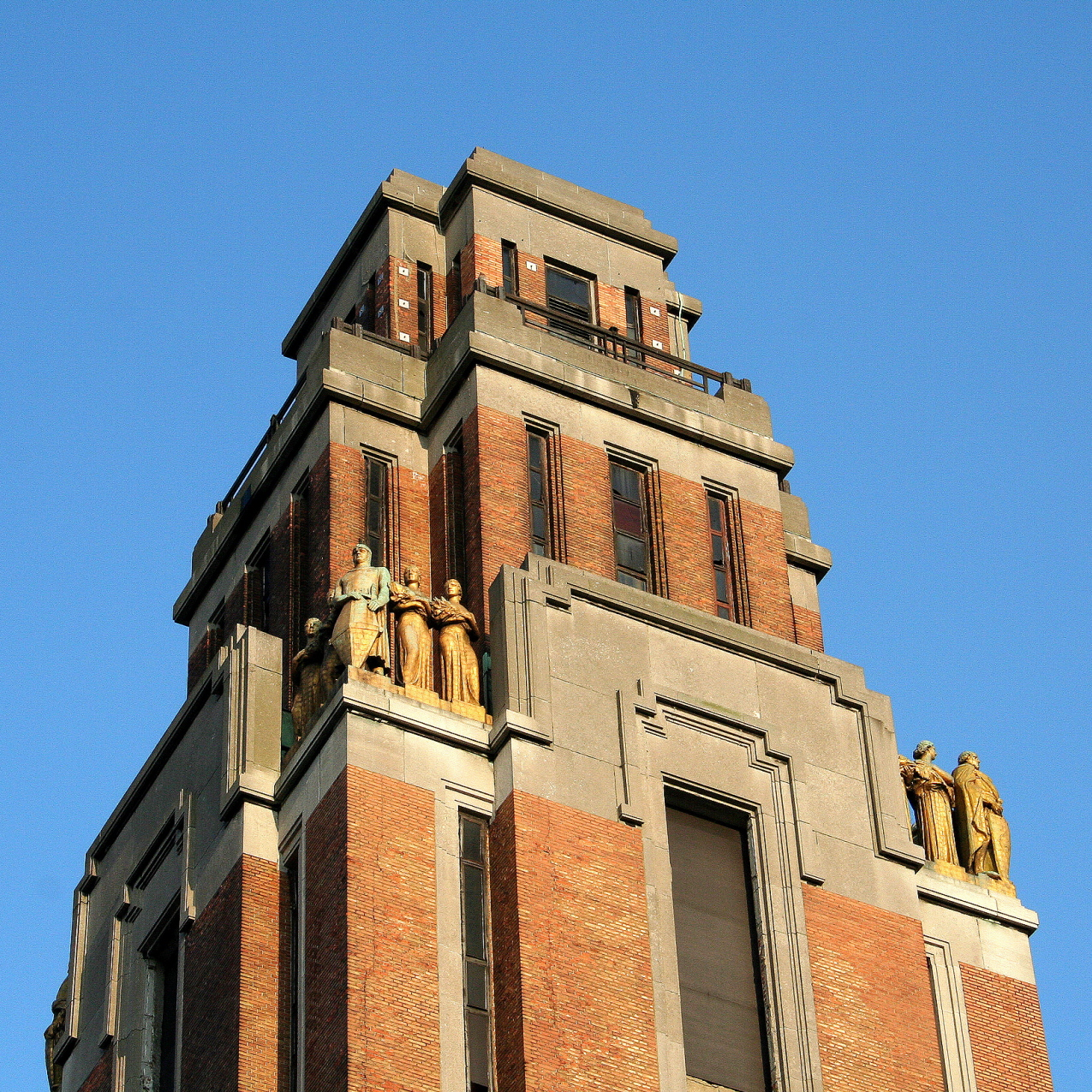
The upper part of the tower

=== Portals ===
The main portal, located on the Chaussée de Bruxelles/Brusselsesteenweg, facing the park and at the foot of the tower, is made of blue stone. It gives access to the Wedding Room, located on the ground floor, and to a monumental staircase of black, grey and white marble, which leads to the Municipal Council Room. The second portal, located on the right side of the building, on the Rue du Curé/Pastoorsstraat, is smaller and gives access to the ticket and administrative offices. The capitals of the portals' pillars are decorated with bas-reliefs that evoke family life and local trades such as brewing, laundry or shoemaking.

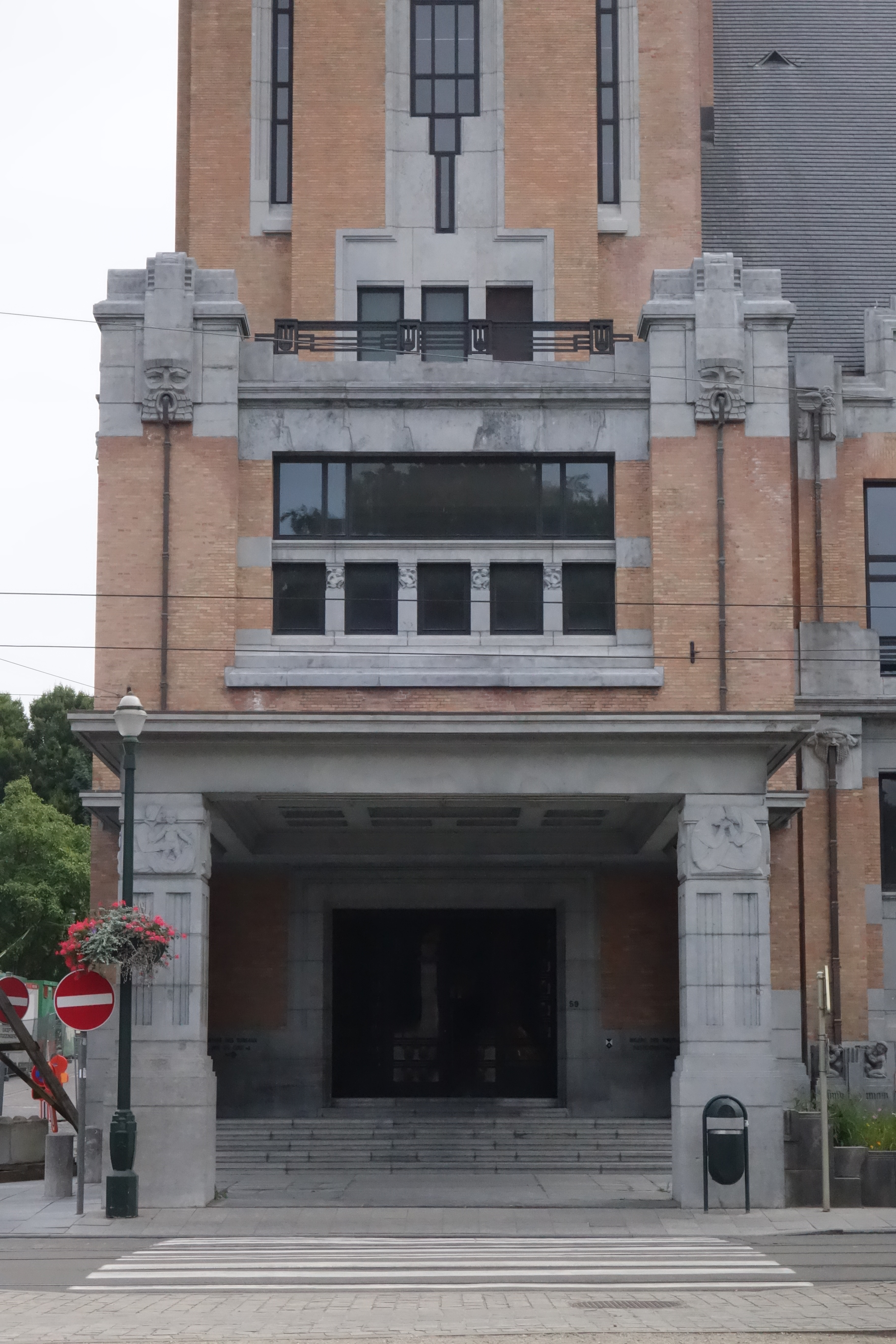
Main portal

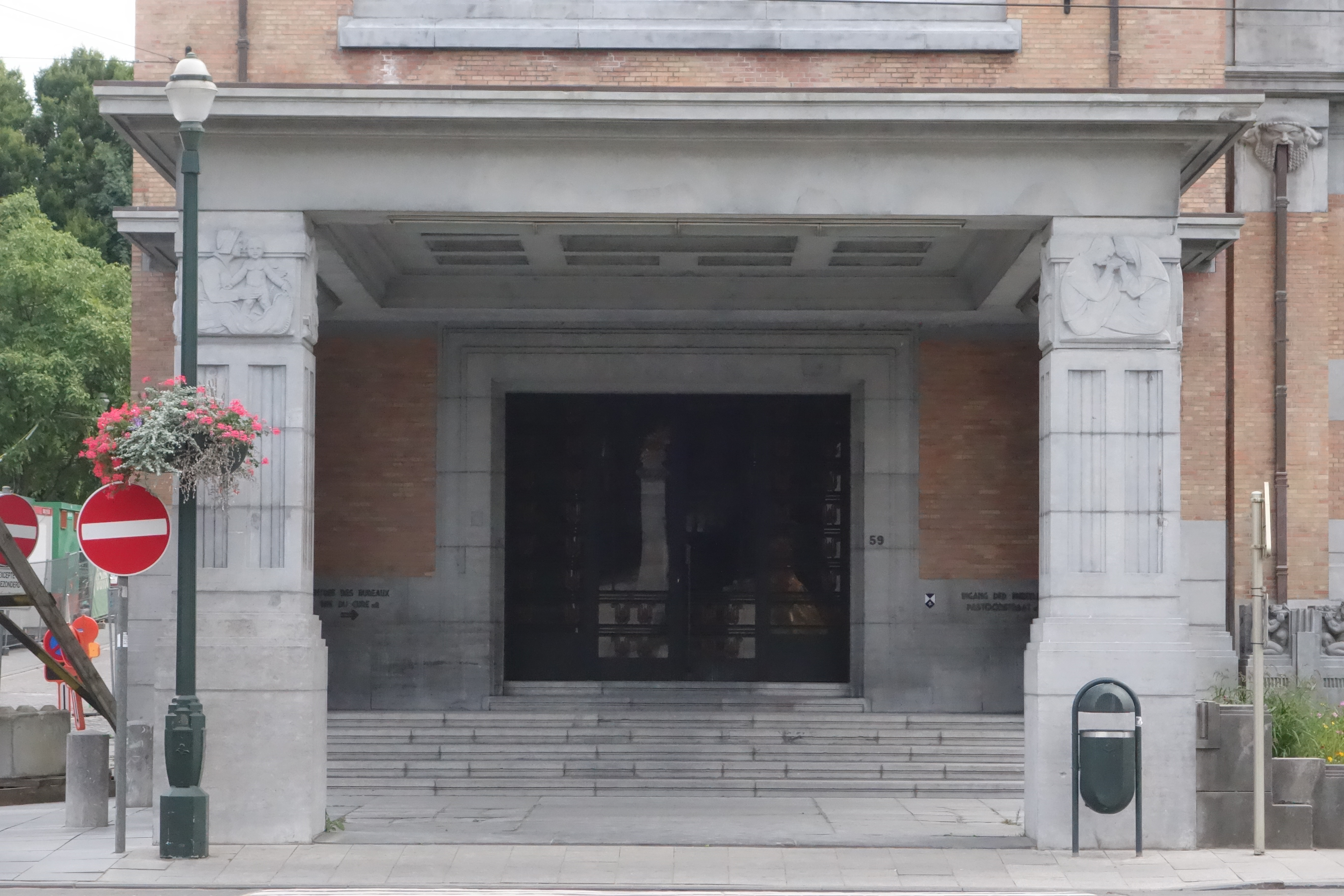
Closeup of the portal

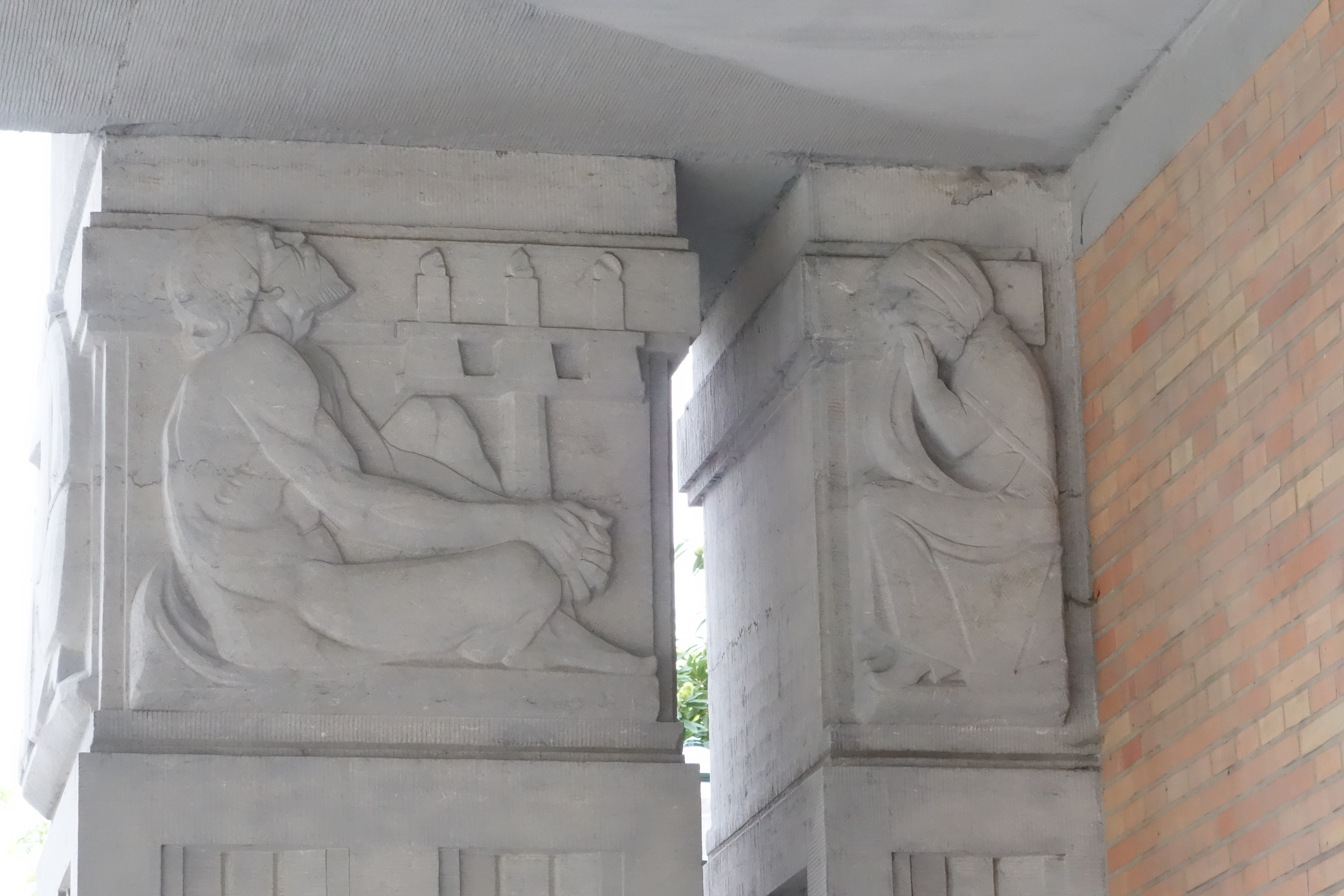
Bas-reliefs of the portal

=== Façades ===
Combining orange brick and blue stone, the façades have numerous brick pilasters whose blue stone capitals are adorned with masks from Greek tragedy or the mouths of animals (e.g. fish, felines) from which sometimes emerge drain pipes. The façades have many stepped gables, the largest of which bears representations of a pelican and a seahorse.

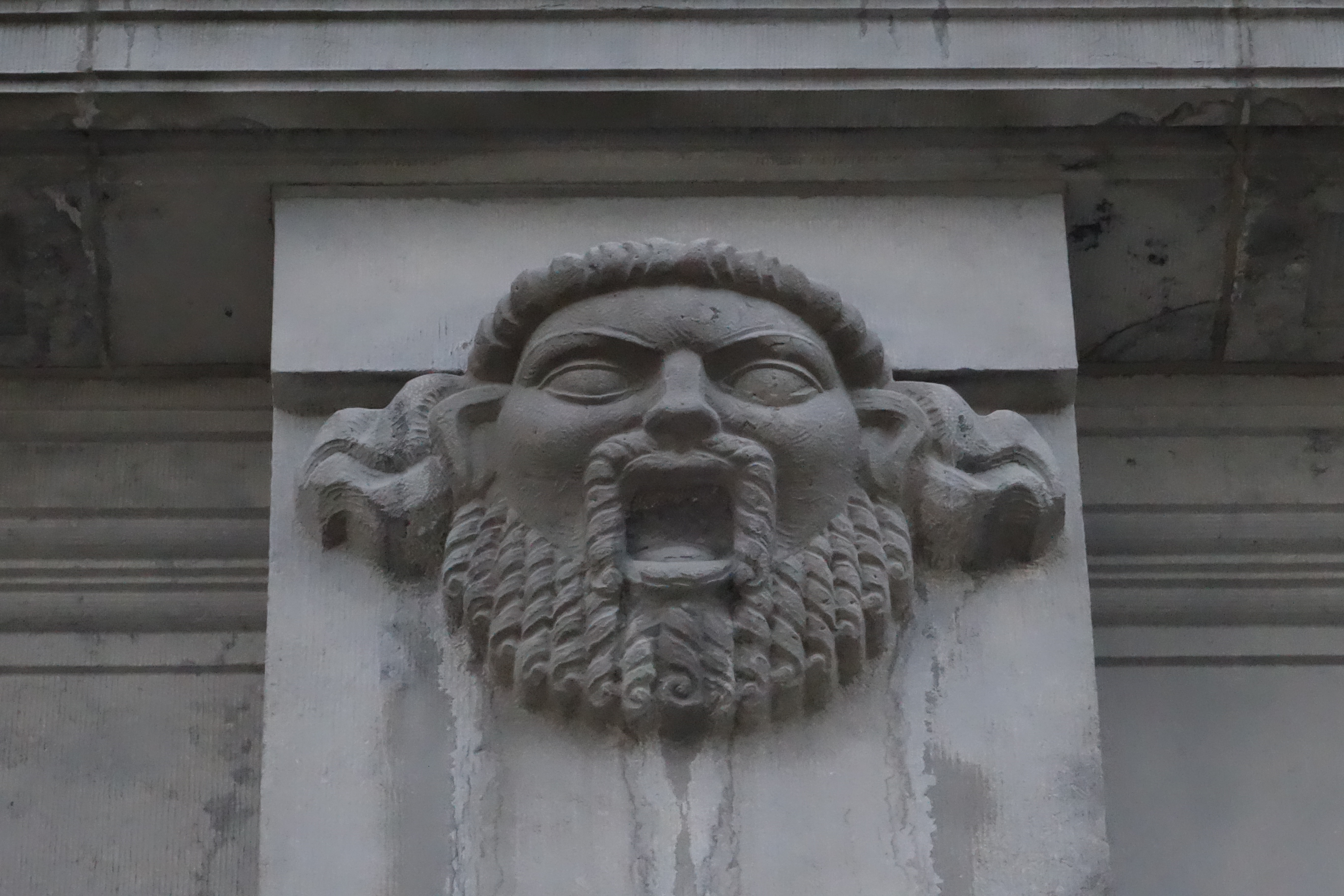
Capital with Greek tragedy mask

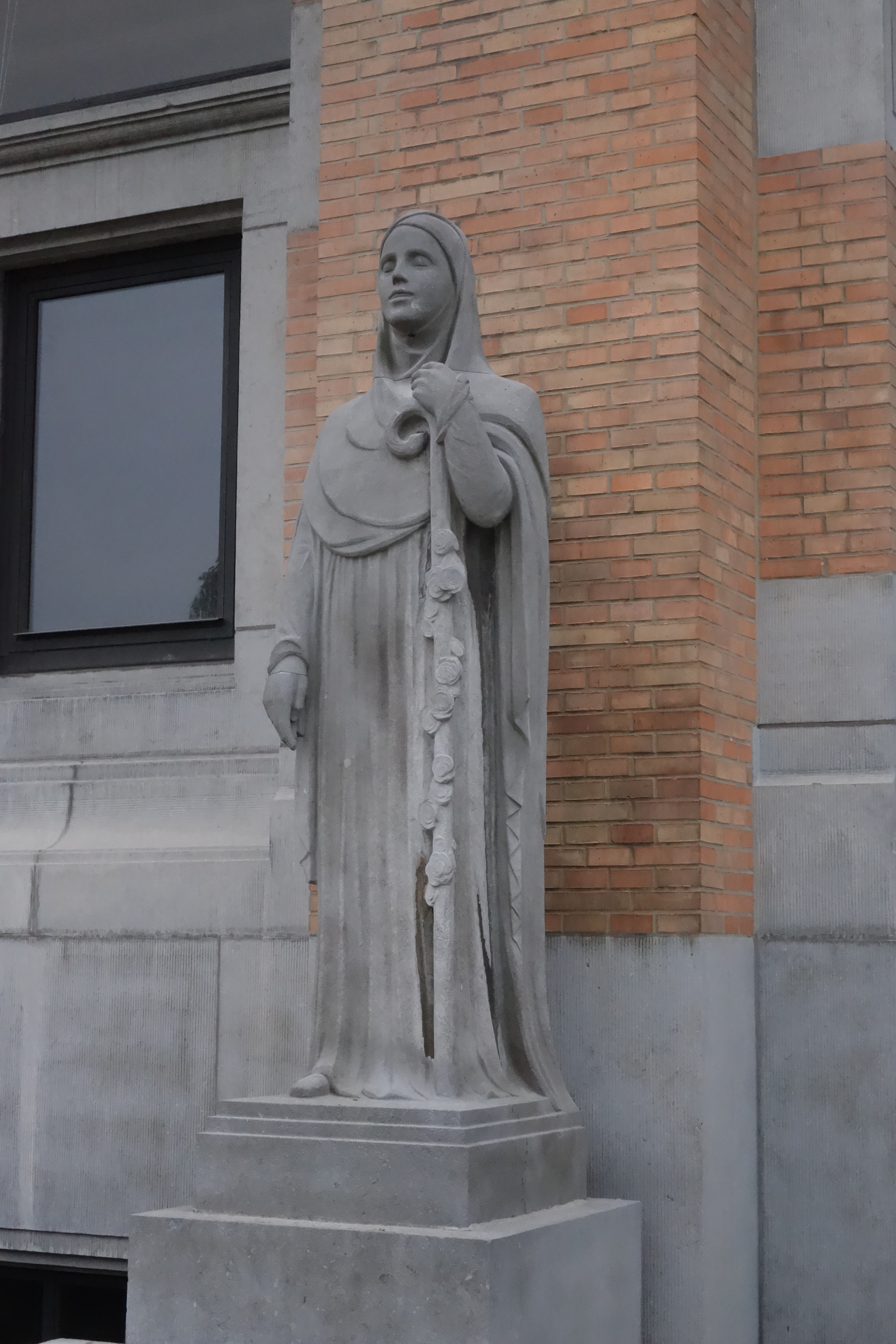
Statue

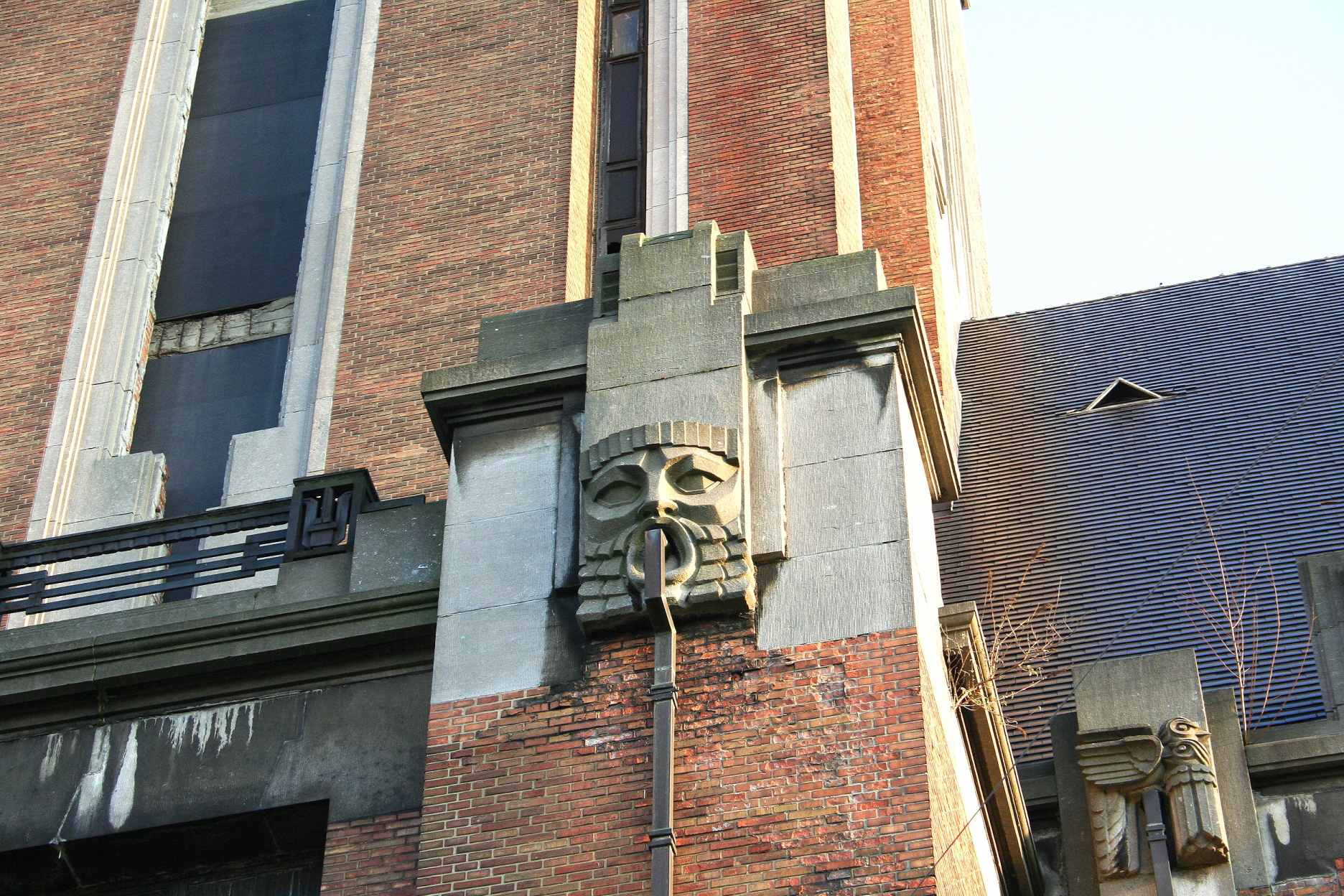
Drainpipe

== See also ==
- Anderlecht Municipal Hall
- Brussels Town Hall
- Molenbeek-Saint-Jean Municipal Hall
- Schaerbeek Municipal Hall
