= Joseph Marien Stadium =

Stadium in Brussels, Belgium

- Stade Joseph Marien (French); Joseph Marienstadion (Dutch)
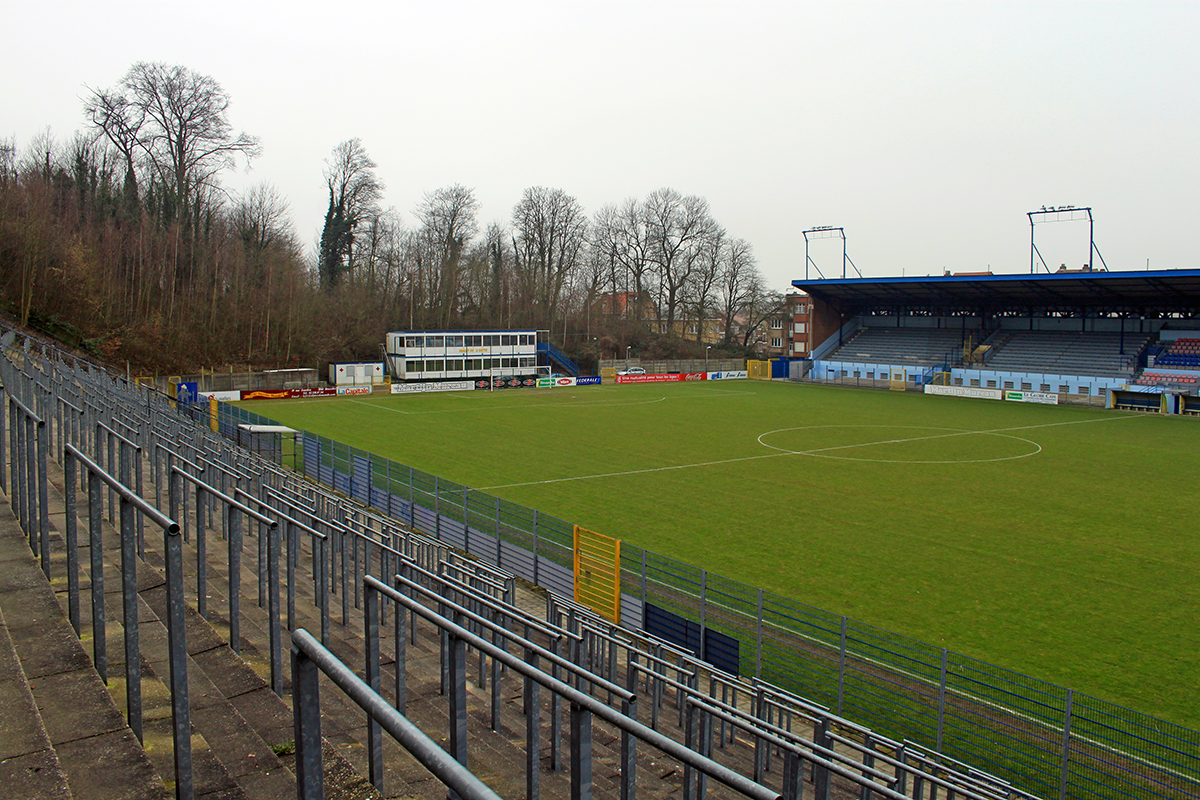
- Joseph Marien Stadium
- Interactive map of Joseph Marien Stadium
- Former names: La Butte
- Location: Chaussée de Bruxelles / Brusselsesteenweg 223, 1190 Forest, Brussels-Capital Region, Belgium
- Coordinates: 50°49′4″N 4°19′45″E
- Capacity: 9,400

Construction
- Built: 1915–1919
- Opened: 14 September 1919
- Renovated: 1926 and 2018
- Expanded: 2018
- Cost: 600,000 Belgian francs
- Architect: Albert Callewaert

Tenant
- Royale Union Saint-Gilloise (1919–present)

The Joseph Marien Stadium (French: Stade Joseph Marien; Dutch: Joseph Marienstadion) is a multi-use stadium located within Duden Park in the municipality of Forest in Brussels, Belgium. It is currently used mostly for football matches and is the home ground of Royale Union Saint-Gilloise. The stadium holds 9,400 since 2018 and was opened in 1919. Its entrance is at one end of the Rue du Stade/Stadionstraat.

== History ==
=== Early construction ===
In 1909, Royale Union Saint-Gilloise was offered a site in Duden Park in Forest, Brussels. Construction started in 1915, during World War I, and ended in 1919. On 14 September 1919, the stadium opened with a friendly game between Royale Union Saint-Gilloise and A.C. Milan.

=== 1920 Summer Olympics ===
The stadium hosted some of the football events for the 1920 Summer Olympics.

№	Date	Round	Game	Result	Attendance
1	August 28, 1920	First round	Netherlands – Luxembourg	3–0	3,000
2	August 28, 1920	First round	Denmark – Spain	0–1	3,000
3	August 29, 1920	Quarter-final	Czechoslovakia – Norway	4–0	4,000

=== 1926 renovation ===
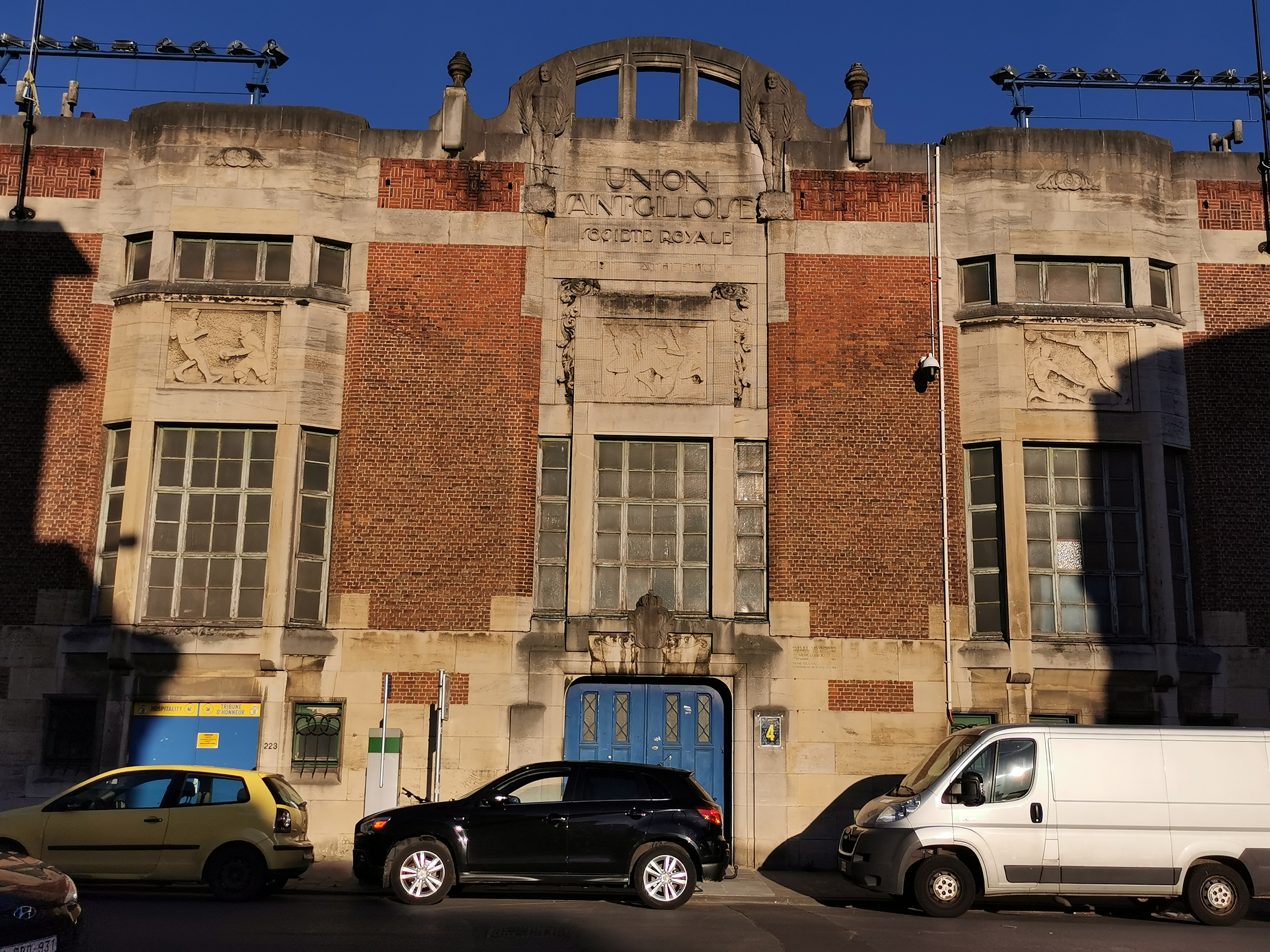
Joseph Marien Stadium façade

In 1926, the stadium was renovated after a design by architect Albert Callewaert. On this occasion, it was given an Art Deco façade that holds bas-reliefs by Oscar De Clercq.

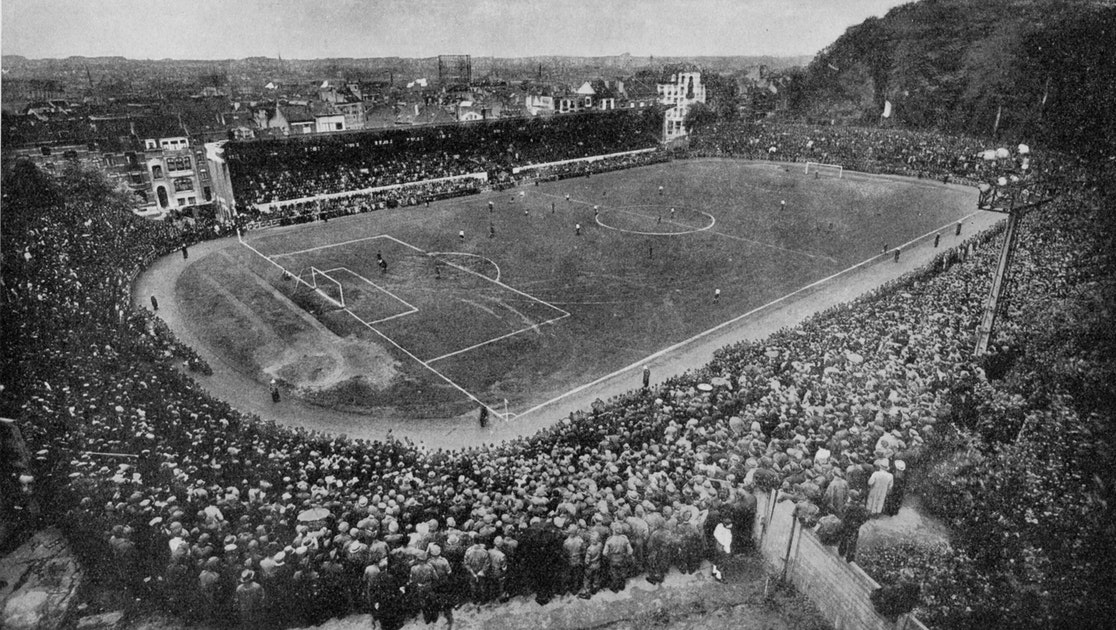
A packed stadium during a match of Union against Daring Club de Bruxelles in the 1930s
