= Forest Town raid =

1966 anti-LGBT police raid in Forest Town, Gauteng, South Africa

The Forest Town raid was a 1966 police raid that targeted LGBT people in Forest Town, Gauteng. The raid led to proposed anti-homosexuality legislation in South Africa. It also helped coalesce the queer community in South Africa.

== Background ==
The South African police had conducted periodic raids on other private queer parties and also in public places prior to the Forest Town raid. These raids, however, were smaller in scope and not publicized in the same way as the Forest Town raid.

As apartheid in South Africa grew in scope, it was also important to the government to end the actions of people who were "deemed threatening to white civilisation." Gay people were seen as "bogeymen" who threatened the country.

== Forest Town raid ==
The Forest Town party was held in January 22, 1966 in the Johannesburg suburb, Forest Town, Gauteng. The party, on Wychwood Road, was meant to be a glamorous event and included prominent gay socialites. It was a "bottle-party" with guests bringing their own alcohol. Around 350 people attended the party. Police, dressed in civilian clothes, raided the home early in the morning and infiltrated the party. They arrested 9 men for different charges, including masquerading as women, "gross indecency" and the illegal sale of liquor. One of the people arrested was drag queen Michele Bruno.

== Aftermath ==
News coverage, including an article from the Rand Daily Mail described the party as a "mass sexy orgy." The press also focused on the professional class, such as prominent doctors and lawyers, who were present at the event. The newspaper even printed names of attendees. The press helped create a fear of "deviant" lifestyles and called it a problem for the white community of South Africa.

Later, evidence collected by the police was used to influence the creation of anti-homosexuality legislation. The legislation proposed was introduced by the Minister of Justice, P.C. Pelser in March of 1967 in the House of Assembly. The new law would criminalize both male and female homosexuality and sentence offenders to prison for up to three years. This is the first time that lesbians would be subject to punishment under the law and it made homosexuality itself not just homosexual actions illegal.

The queer community became more politically organized after the raids in order to fight the proposed laws. Lesbians, feeling an existential threat, especially became more active. Queer activists created the Homosexual Law Reform Fund (Law Reform) to raise money for attorneys to challenge the proposed law. Law Reform groups were created across the country. The Law Reform movement did cause the South African legislature to drop the proposed law and instead the Select Committee created three amendments to the current law of the Immorality Act. These included raising the age of consent for homosexual sex acts to age 19, outlawed dildoes and criminalized male homosexual acts at parties.

Black LGBT individuals were also further marginalized after the raids. However, gay culture overall in South Africa found a greater sense of coherence following the fight against the anti-homosexual laws.
