= Forest Park, Brussels =

Park in Forest, Belgium

Forest Park
- Parc de Forest (French); Park van Vorst (Dutch)
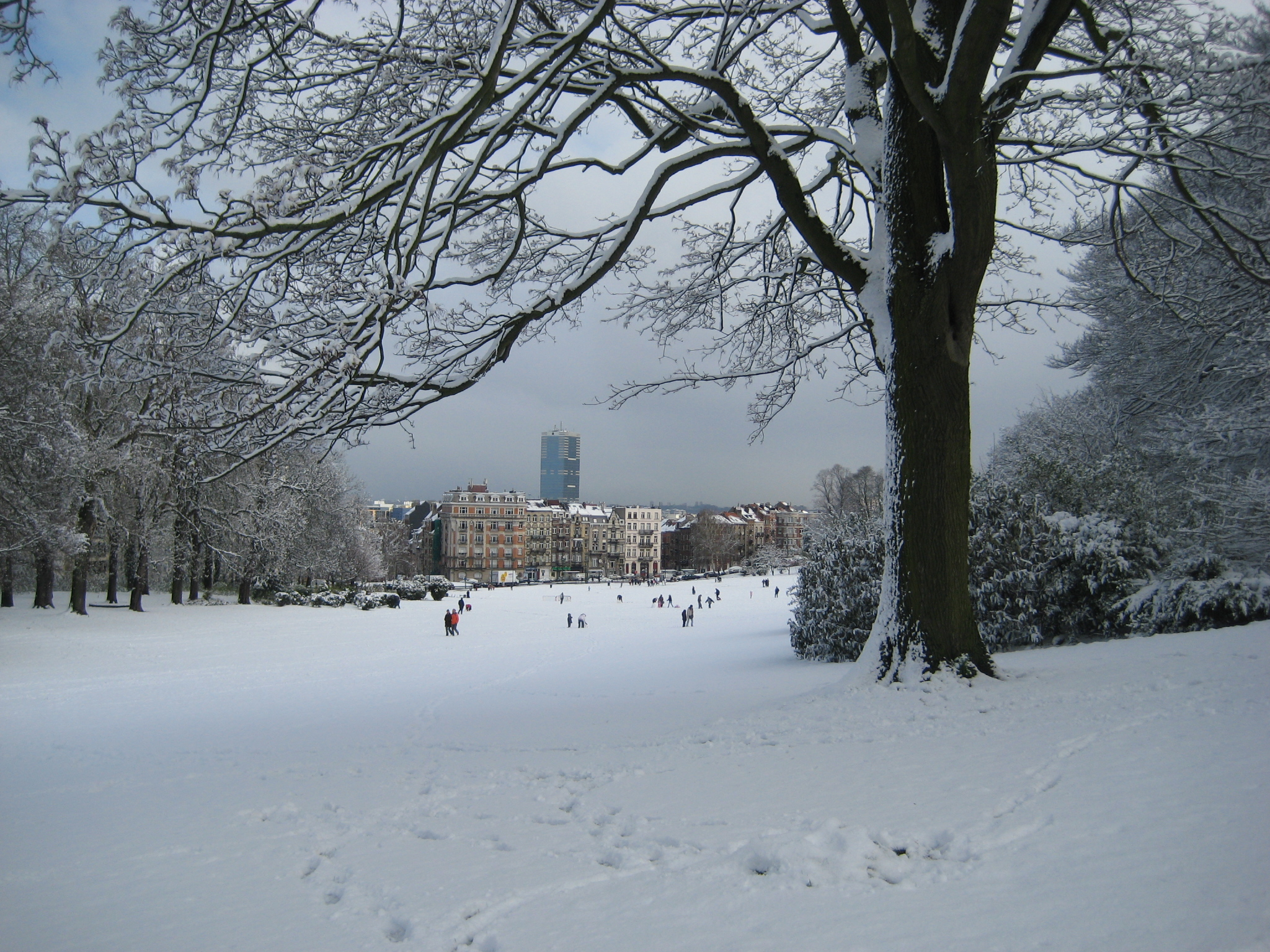
- Forest Park in the winter
- Interactive map of Forest Park
- Type: Public park
- Location: Forest, Brussels-Capital Region, Belgium
- Coordinates: 50°49′21″N 4°20′13″E
- Area: 13 ha (32 acres)
- Created: 1882
- Status: Open year-round

Forest Park (French: Parc de Forest, pronounced [paʁk də fɔʁɛ]) or Vorst Park (Dutch: Park van Vorst, pronounced [ˈpɑr(ə)k fɑɱ ˈvɔrst]) is an urban public park located in and named after the municipality of Forest in Brussels, Belgium. It was designed by the architect and urbanist Victor Besme and covers an area of 13 ha (32 acres).

Forest Park is adjacent to Duden Park to its south, which is home to the stadium of Royale Union Saint-Gilloise, the historic football club from the neighbouring municipality of Saint-Gilles, although the club is not located in the municipality, whose border with Forest is to the north of Forest Park.

== History ==
The park was created, like many in Brussels, on the initiative of King Leopold II. The execution of the plans was entrusted to the architect and urbanist Victor Besme, after whom the adjacent Avenue Besme/Besmelaan is also named. The project was funded privately through "anonymous donations" from Leopold II and figures such as Georges Montefiore-Levi, due to a lack of agreement between the neighbouring municipalities of Forest and Saint-Gilles. The park was opened to the public in 1882 under the names Parc de Saint-Gilles/Park van Sint-Gillis ("Saint-Gilles Park") or Parc du Midi/Zuidpark ("South Park"). In 1890, the king commissioned the French landscape architect Elie Lainé to modify the park's plans in order to create a vantage point towards the newly constructed Palace of Justice. In 1913, the park received its current name.

== Location and layout ==
The park is located in the north of Forest, and is surrounded by a set of streets that connect the Avenue Albert/Albertlaan to the Avenue Wielemans Ceuppens/Wielemans Ceuppenslaan, making them part of the Greater Ring. Those streets are the Avenue des Villas/Villalaan to the north, the Avenue du Mont Kemmel/Kemmelberglaan to the east, the Avenue Besme/Besmelaan to the south and the Avenue Reine Marie-Henriette/Koningin Maria-Hendrikalaan to the south-west. It is also connected to Duden Park, situated further south, by the Square Lainé/Lainésquare.

The park covers the steep slope between the upper and lower parts of Forest. It consists mainly of large lawns and an artificial mound planted with chestnut trees. The park's upper part, close to the highest point in Brussels, offers a sweeping panoramic view of the city. A dozen church steeples can be seen from the mound, which served as an observation point during the First World War.

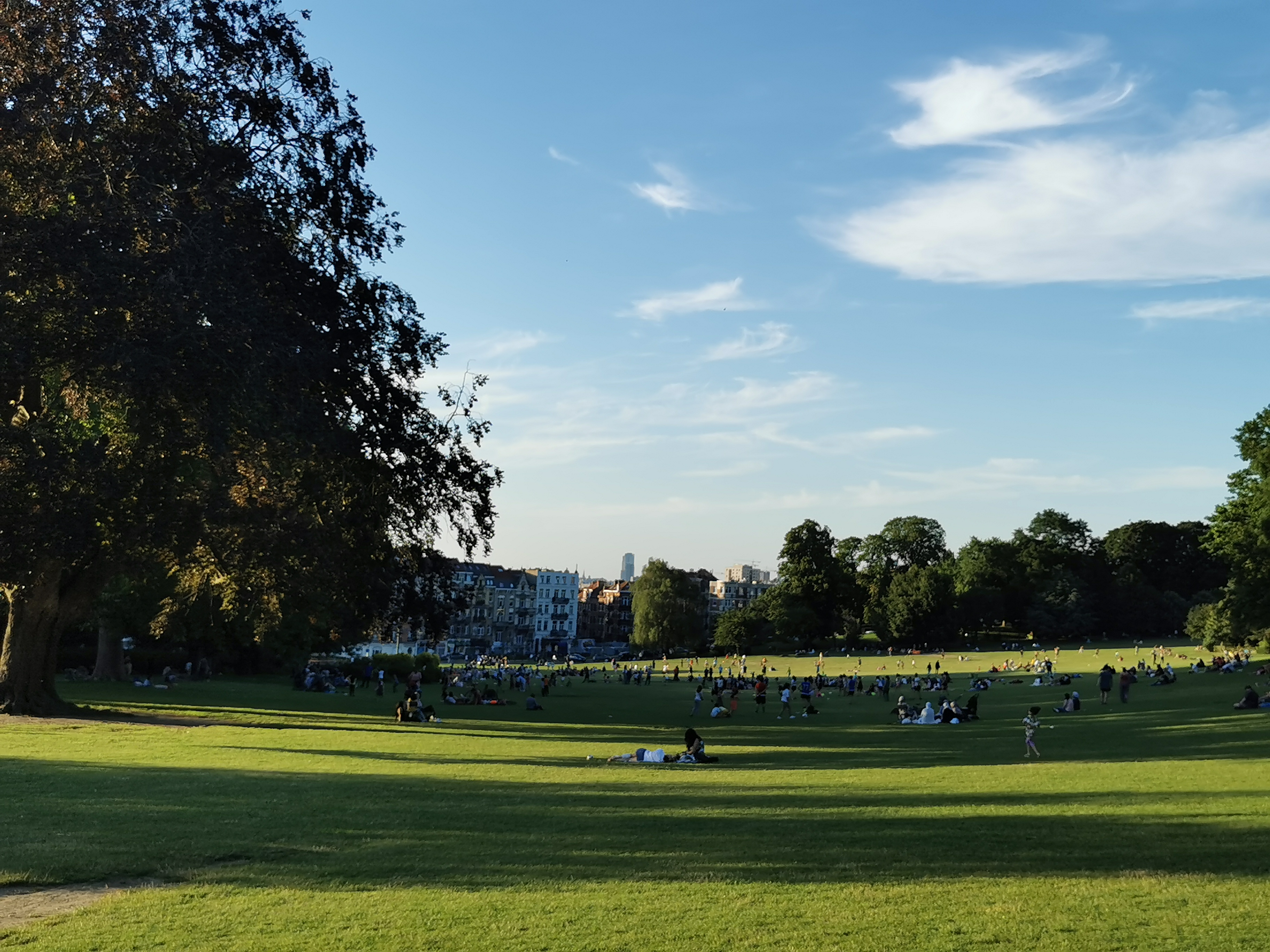
View of the large lawn

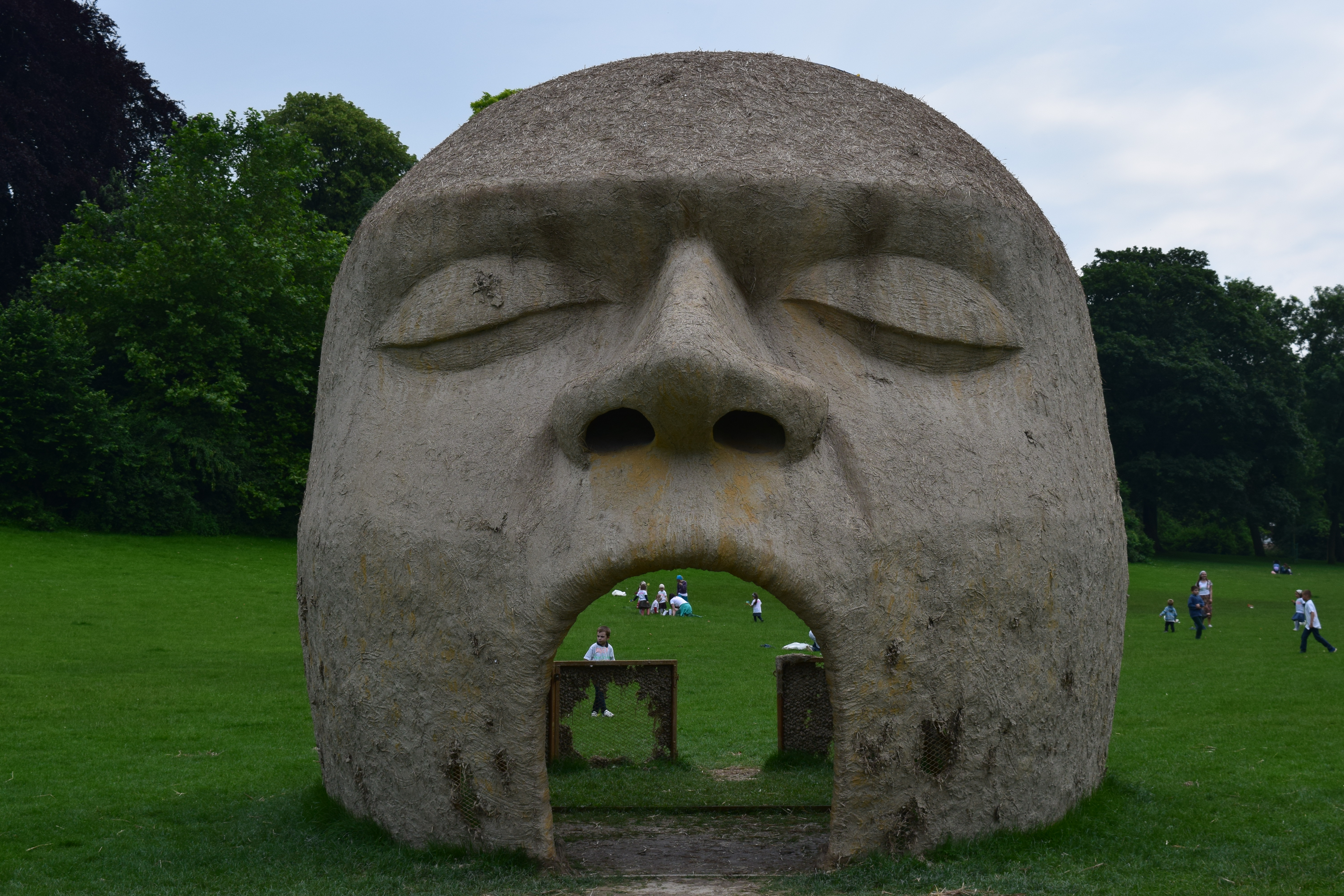
The Being by Fred Martin (2016)

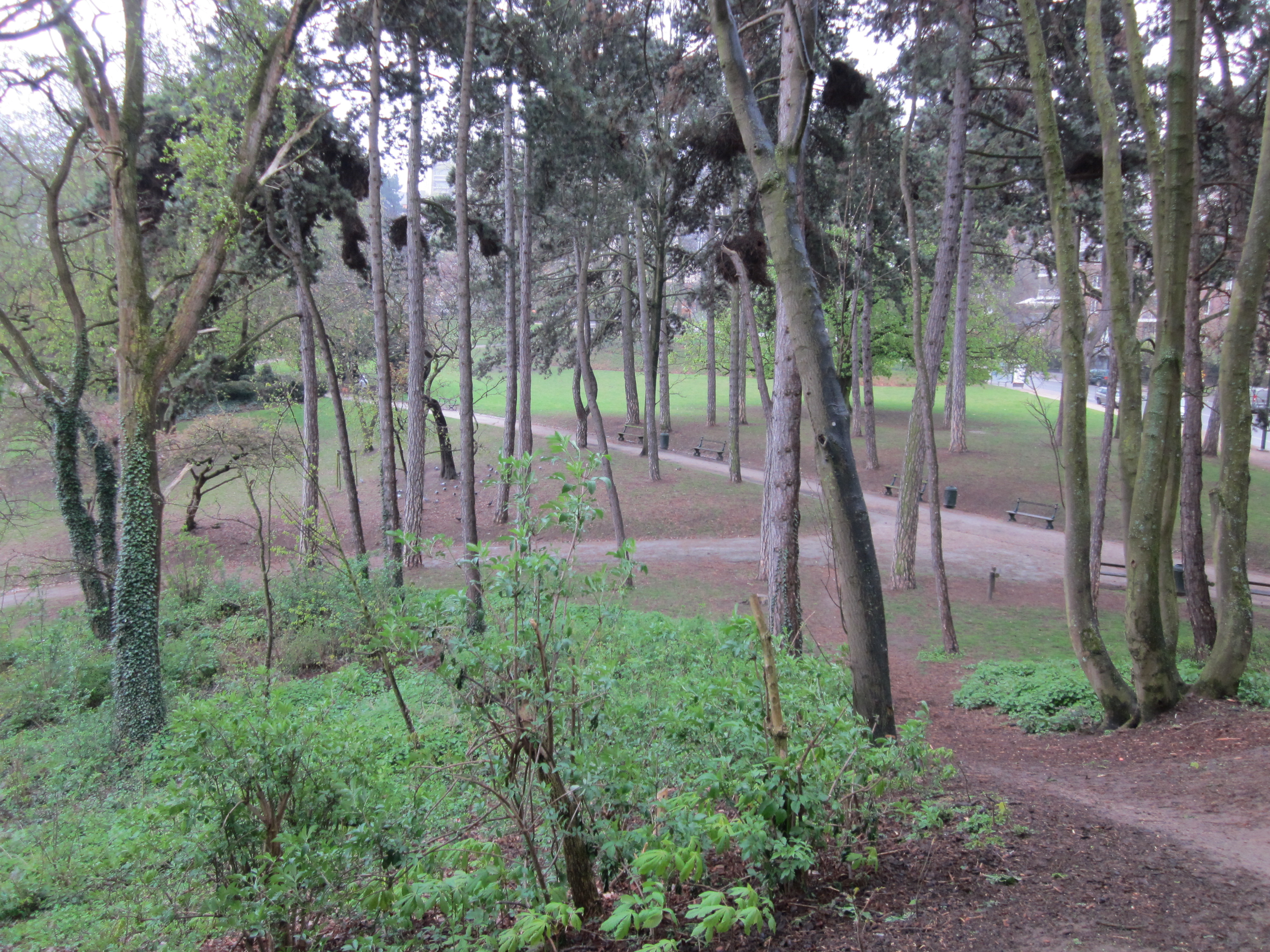
Pine trees colonised by parakeets

== See also ==
- List of parks and gardens in Brussels
- History of Brussels
- Belgium in the long nineteenth century
