= Forest, Belgium =

Municipality of the Brussels-Capital Region, Belgium

Forest: Forest (French); Vorst (Dutch)
- Municipality
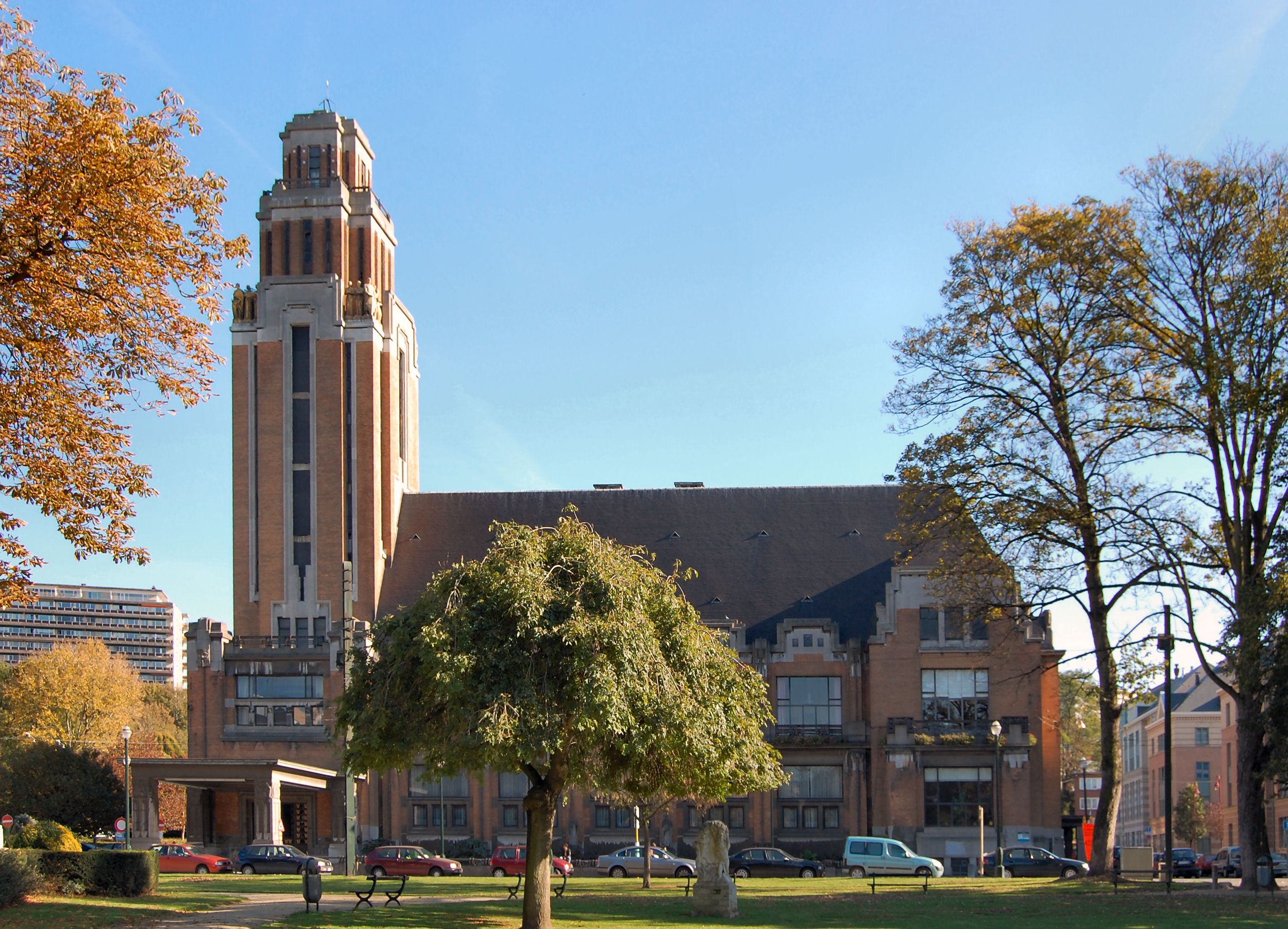
- Forest's Municipal Hall

- Flag Coat of arms

- Forest municipality in the Brussels-Capital Region
- Interactive map of Forest
- Location in Belgium
- Coordinates: 50°48′47″N 04°19′29″E
- Country: Belgium
- Community: Flemish Community; French Community
- Region: Brussels-Capital
- Arrondissement: Brussels-Capital

Government
  - Mayor: Charles Spapens (PS)
  - Governing party: PS - Vooruit / PTB / Ecolo - Groen

Area
  - Total: 6.29 km^{2} (2.43 sq mi)

Population (2020-01-01)
  - Total: 56,581
  - Density: 9,000/km^{2} (23,300/sq mi)
- Postal codes: 1190
- NIS code: 21007
- Area codes: 02
- Website: forest.brussels

Forest (French, pronounced [fɔʁɛ]) or Vorst (Dutch, pronounced [vɔrst]), is one of the 19 municipalities of the Brussels-Capital Region, Belgium. Located in the southern part of the region, it is bordered by Anderlecht, Ixelles, Uccle, and Saint-Gilles, as well as the Flemish municipality of Drogenbos. Like all municipalities in Brussels, it is officially bilingual (French–Dutch).

As of 1 January 2022, the municipality had a population of 56,616 inhabitants. The total area is 6.29 km^{2} (2.43 sq mi), which gives a population density of 8,998/km^{2} (23,300/sq mi).

The municipality is commonly known for Forest National/Vorst Nationaal concert hall. It houses an Audi factory and a railway depot that is home to the Belgian fleet of Eurostar train sets. It also formerly had a prison, Forest Prison.

== Toponymy ==
The first inhabitants named their village Vorst, which was likely based on the Old Dutch word Vorstbosch, meaning "forest" (bosch) of the "prince" (vorst). This likely found its origin in the Latin name forestem silvam, meaning "private forest". This also explains why the French translation differs from the original Dutch name; whereas the other 18 municipalities of the Brussels-Capital Region retained the Dutch phonetic name in their French translation, Vorst was translated into Forest, likely based on the Latin concept of forestem silvam.

== History ==
=== Frankish origins and medieval period ===
The first houses built in this forested area along the Geleysbeek, a tributary of the river Senne, date from the 7th century. The village's first church was dedicated to Saint Dionysius the Areopagite. The legend of Saint Alena, a young convert to Chalcedonian Christianity murdered by her father's troops for hearing mass at the church of Dionysius, also takes place in the 7th century. The chapel and cult of Saint Alena, however, date only from the 12th century. The saint's cenotaph, one of the rare examples of 12th-century sculpture in Belgium, can still be admired in the chapel today. The contiguous Church of St. Denis (Dionysius) was rebuilt in the Romanesque style at around the same time.

The abbots of Affligem, which had been the ecclesiastical owners of the parish since the bishop of Cambrai ceded it to them in 1105, decided to build a priory for women in Forest; Forest Abbey. The first abbess of the Forest priory was appointed in 1239. Also in the 13th century, the Romanesque Church of St. Denis was rebuilt in the newer Gothic style. The neighbouring abbatial church was rebuilt in the 15th century.

=== 17th century until today ===
During the period of the Austrian Netherlands, especially during the reigns of Archdukes Albert and Isabella, Forest prospered, thanks to the Abbey. On 26 March 1764, however, a devastating fire ruined some of the buildings and destroyed many of its artworks. Three decades later, in the years following the French Revolution, the religious community was disbanded, the nuns forced to flee, and the buildings sold. The municipality bought the Abbey in 1964 and proceeded to restore it to its former glory.

== Government and infrastructure ==
Forest Prison closed in 2022. Haren Prison took prisoners and many employees formerly at Forest Prison.

== Main sights ==
- The Municipal Hall of Forest, designed in Art Deco style by the architect Jean-Baptiste Dewin and inaugurated in 1938, is located near the old historic centre.
- The Church of St. Denis and the adjoining Chapel of St. Alena house unique specimens of Romanesque sculpture. The nearby Benedictine abbey is now home to a cultural centre.
- The Church of St. Augustine on the Place de l'Altitude Cent/Hoogte Honderdplein (a square named due to its altitude of one hundred metres above sea level), also in Art Deco style.
- The Villa Beau-Site, also known as the Nelissen House, a striking example of Art Nouveau in Brussels.
- The WIELS contemporary art centre, housed in the former Wielemans-Ceuppens brewery.
- Finally, the municipality maintains several green areas, including Duden Park and the aptly named Forest Park.
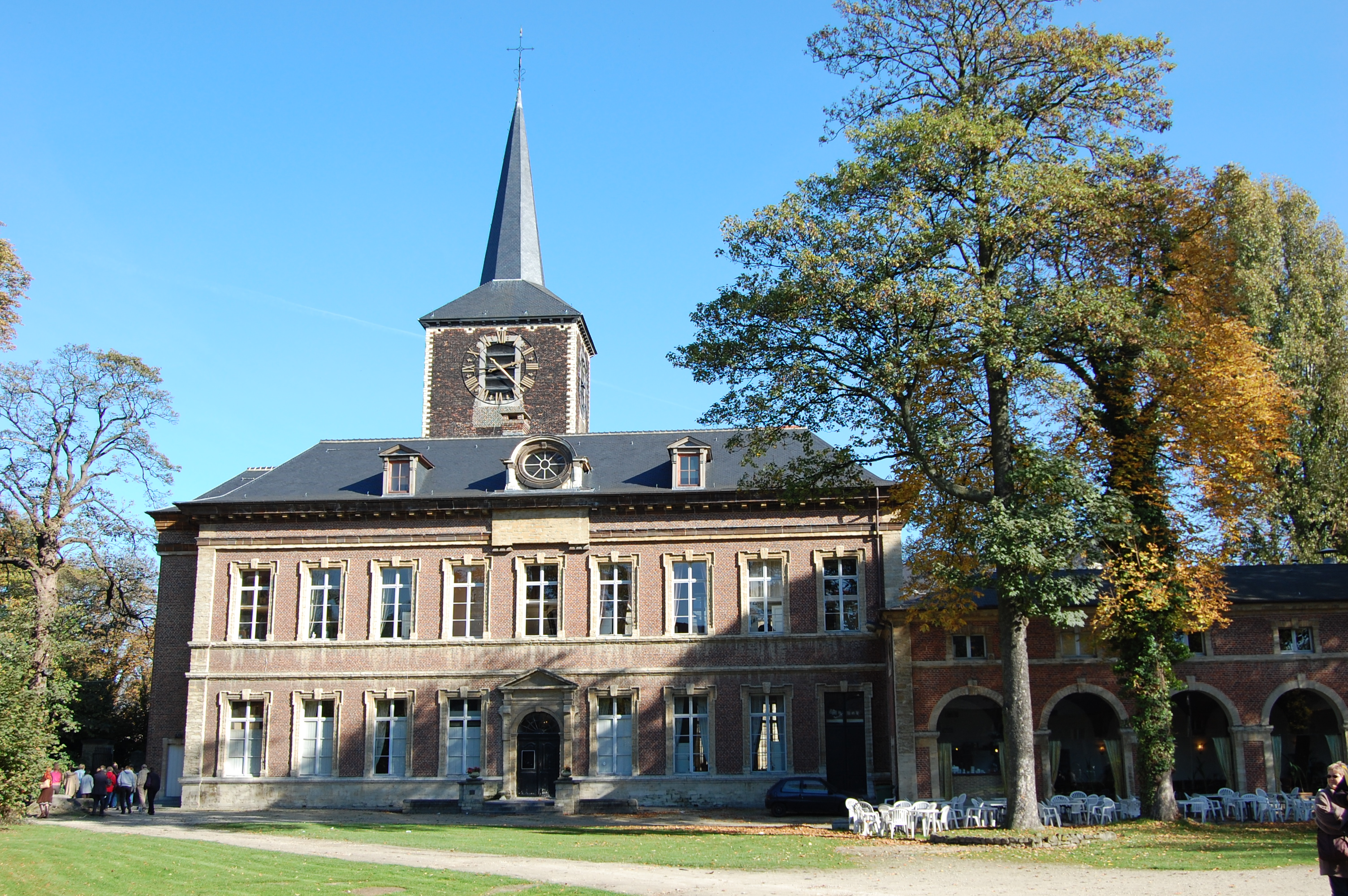
Forest Abbey

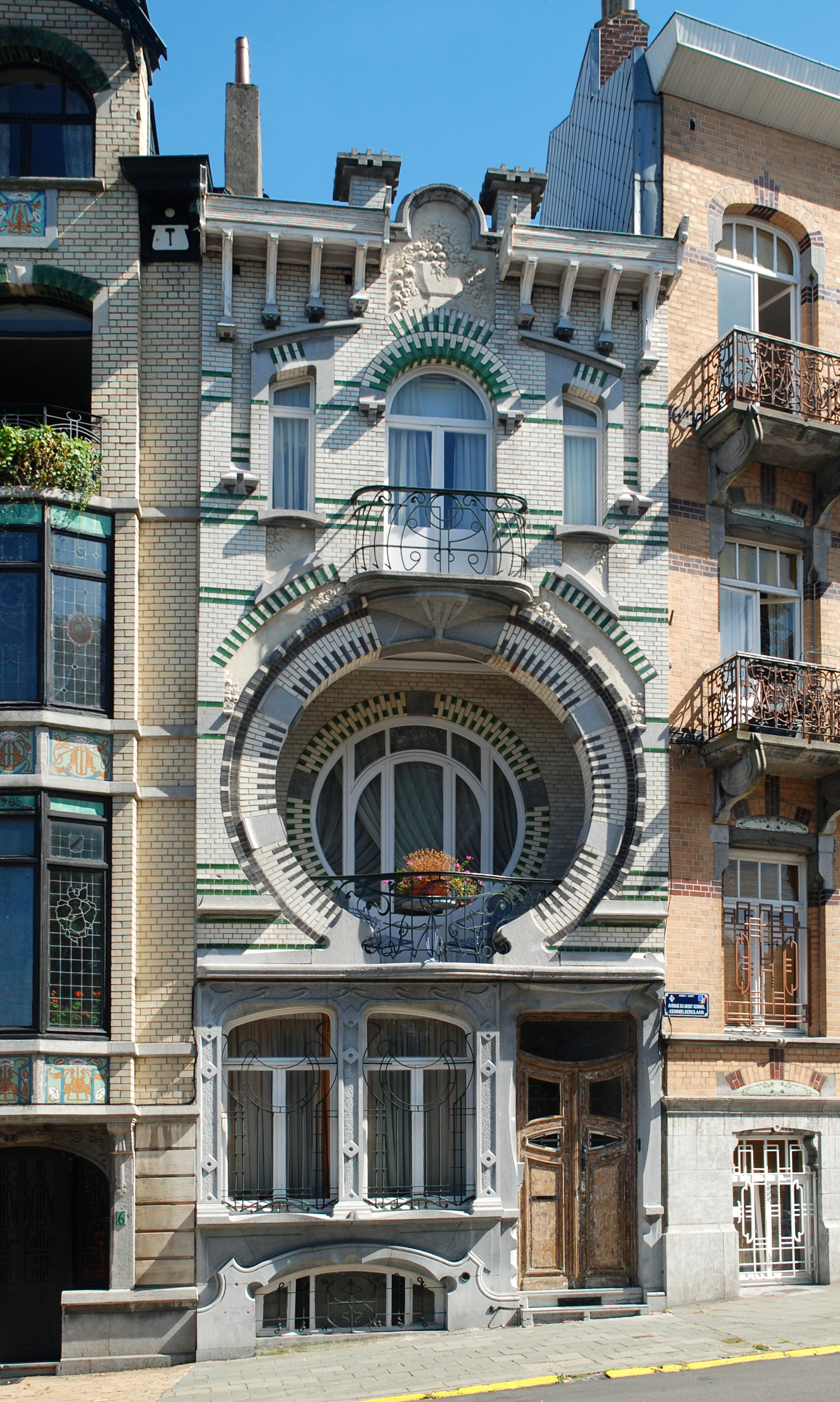
Villa Beau-Site

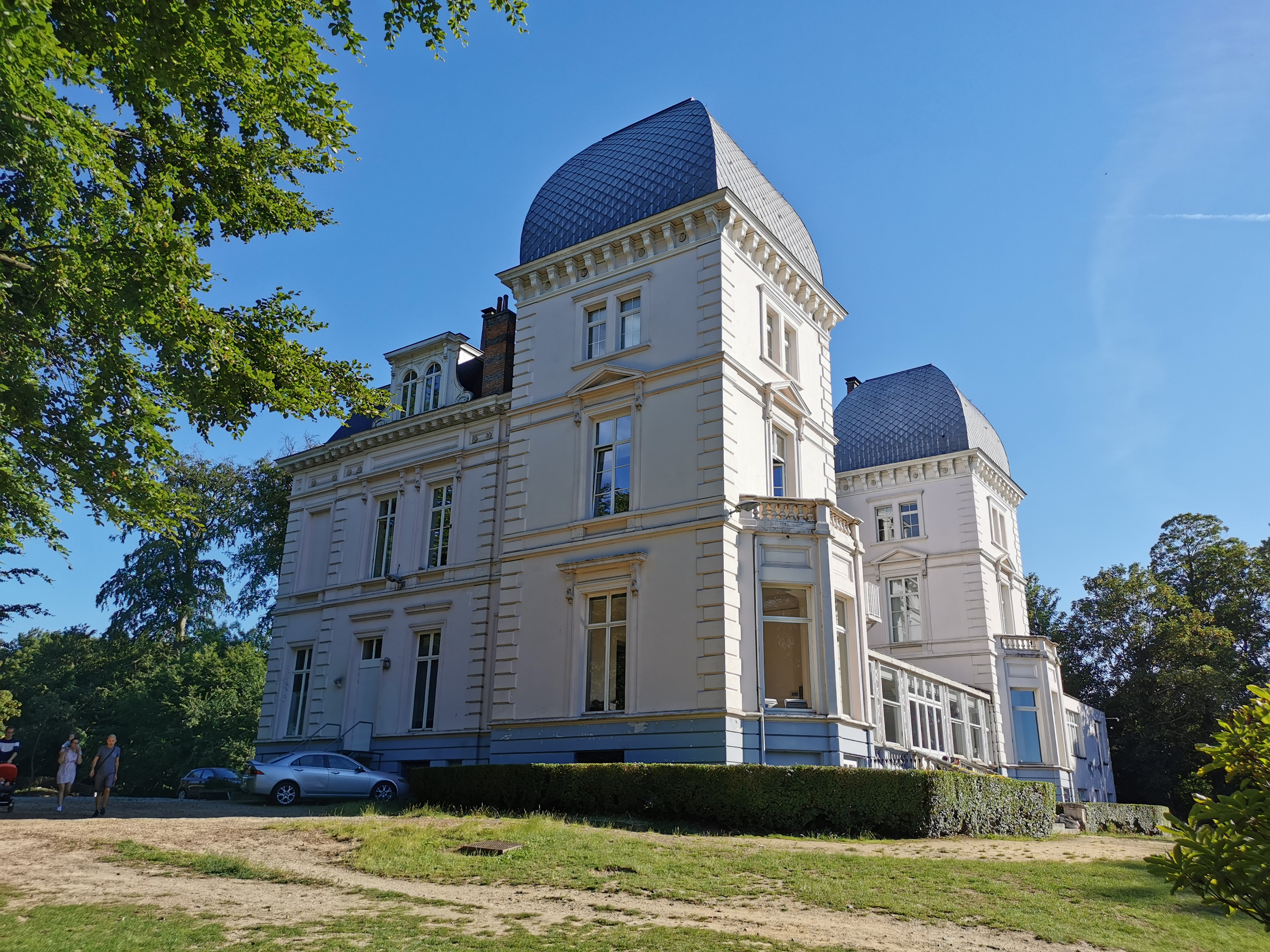
Duden Park château

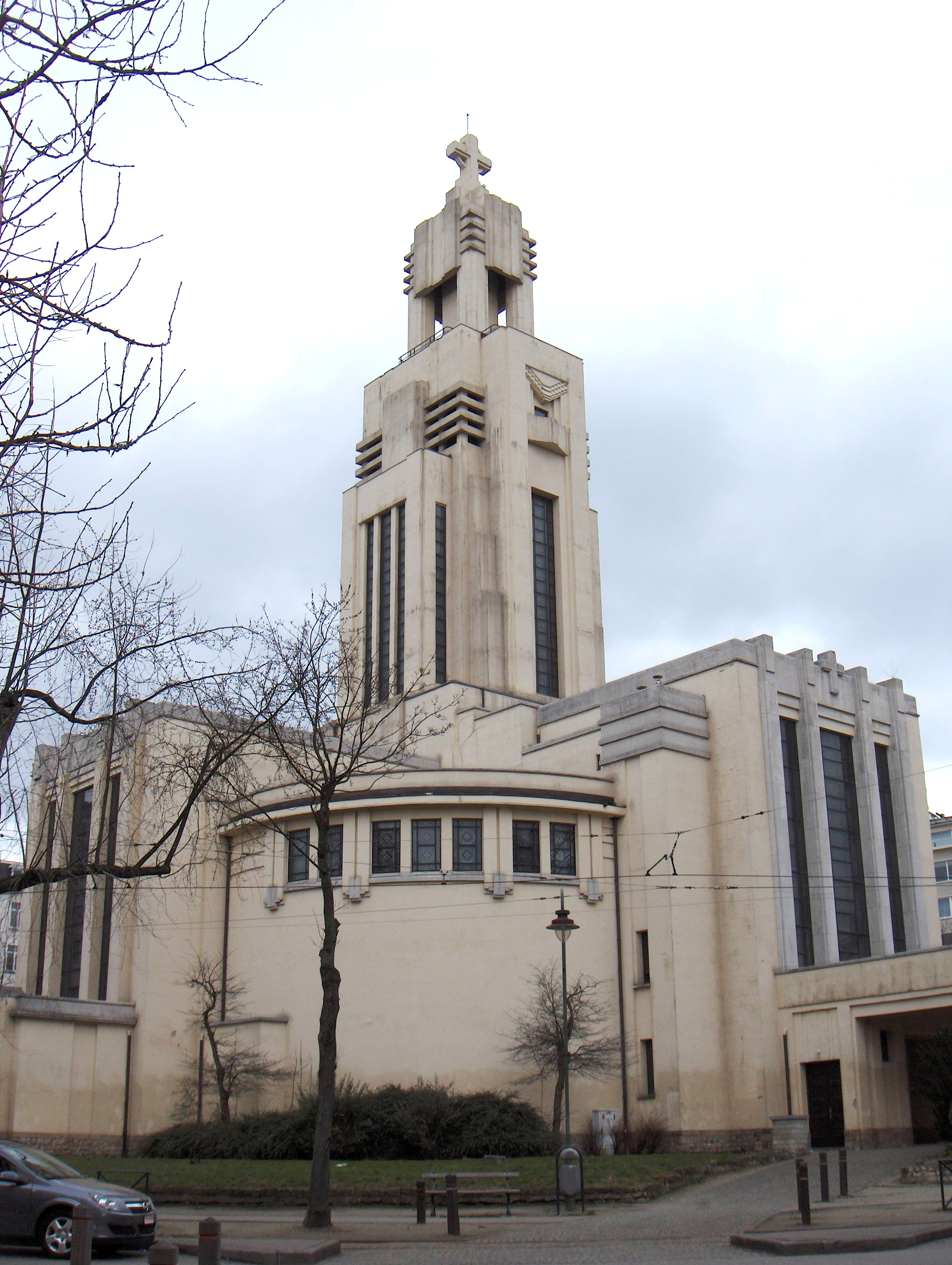
Church of St. Augustine

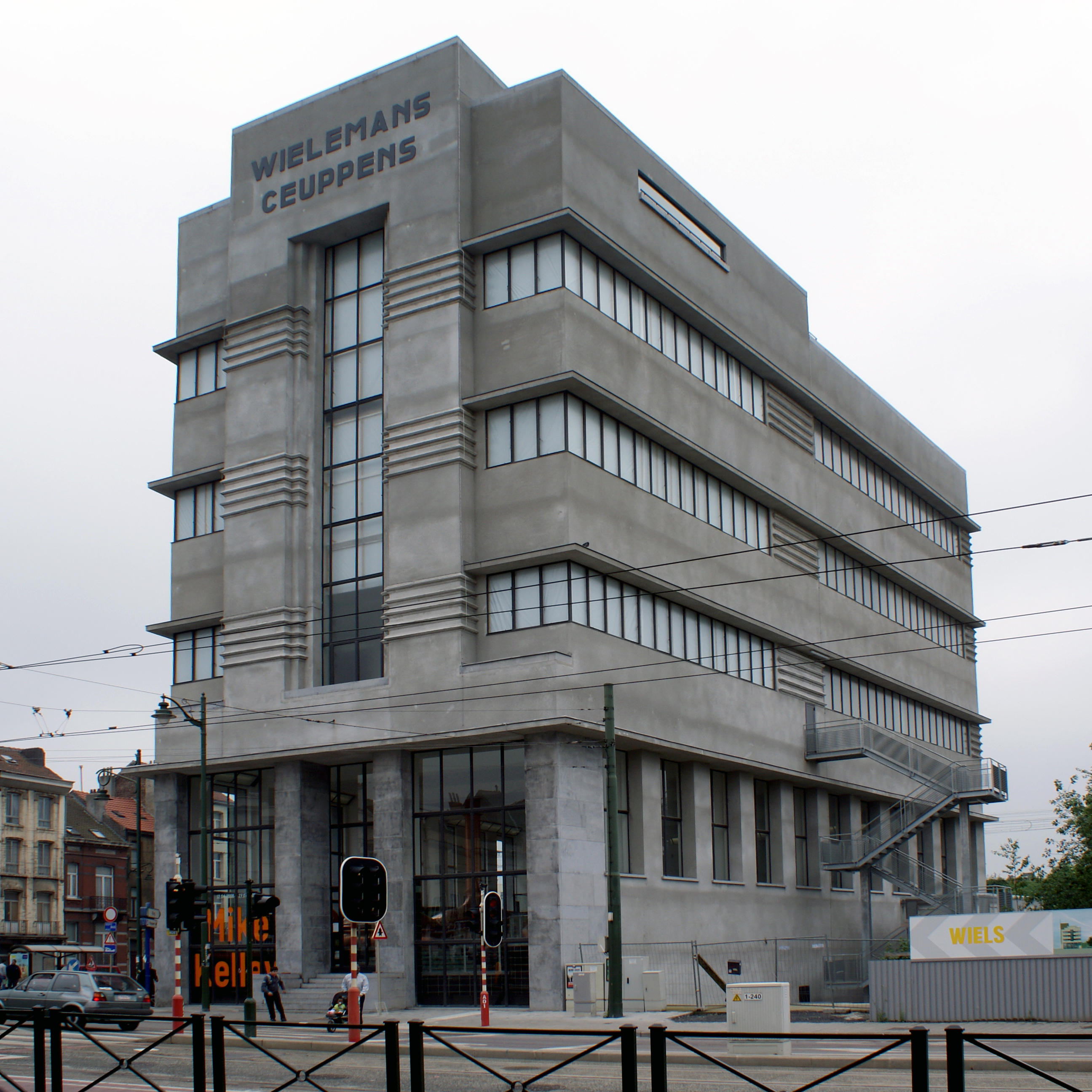
WIELS

== Events and folklore ==
- The Forest National/Vorst Nationaal concert hall is well known in the world of show business, arts and culture, as one of the prime venues for international star performances.
- On the grounds of Forest Abbey, a three-day-long "Medieval Celebration" is organised in September, where hosts and visitors alike are dressed as knights, burghers, soldiers, and a variety of other medieval attire. Typical activities include watching assorted magicians, jugglers and fire-eaters, listening to musicians perform on period instruments, appreciating old-time crafts, and tasting forgotten drinks and dishes.
- Since 1987, Forest has giant puppets of its own; Nele and Pauline, both baptised at the Abbey, and their children, Alida and Paville.

== Notable inhabitants ==
- Jean Delville (1867–1953), symbolist painter, writer, and occultist
- Raymond Goethals (1921–2004), football coach
- Stuart Merrill (1863–1915), American symbolist poet
- Louise Ochsé (1884–1944), sculptor
- Paul Vanden Boeynants (1919–2001), politician, Minister of Defence and Prime Minister
- Eugène Ysaÿe (1858–1931), virtuoso violinist, composer, and conductor

== International relations ==
=== Twin towns and sister cities ===
Forest is twinned with:

- Courbevoie, France
