= Johannesburg Holocaust and Genocide Centre =

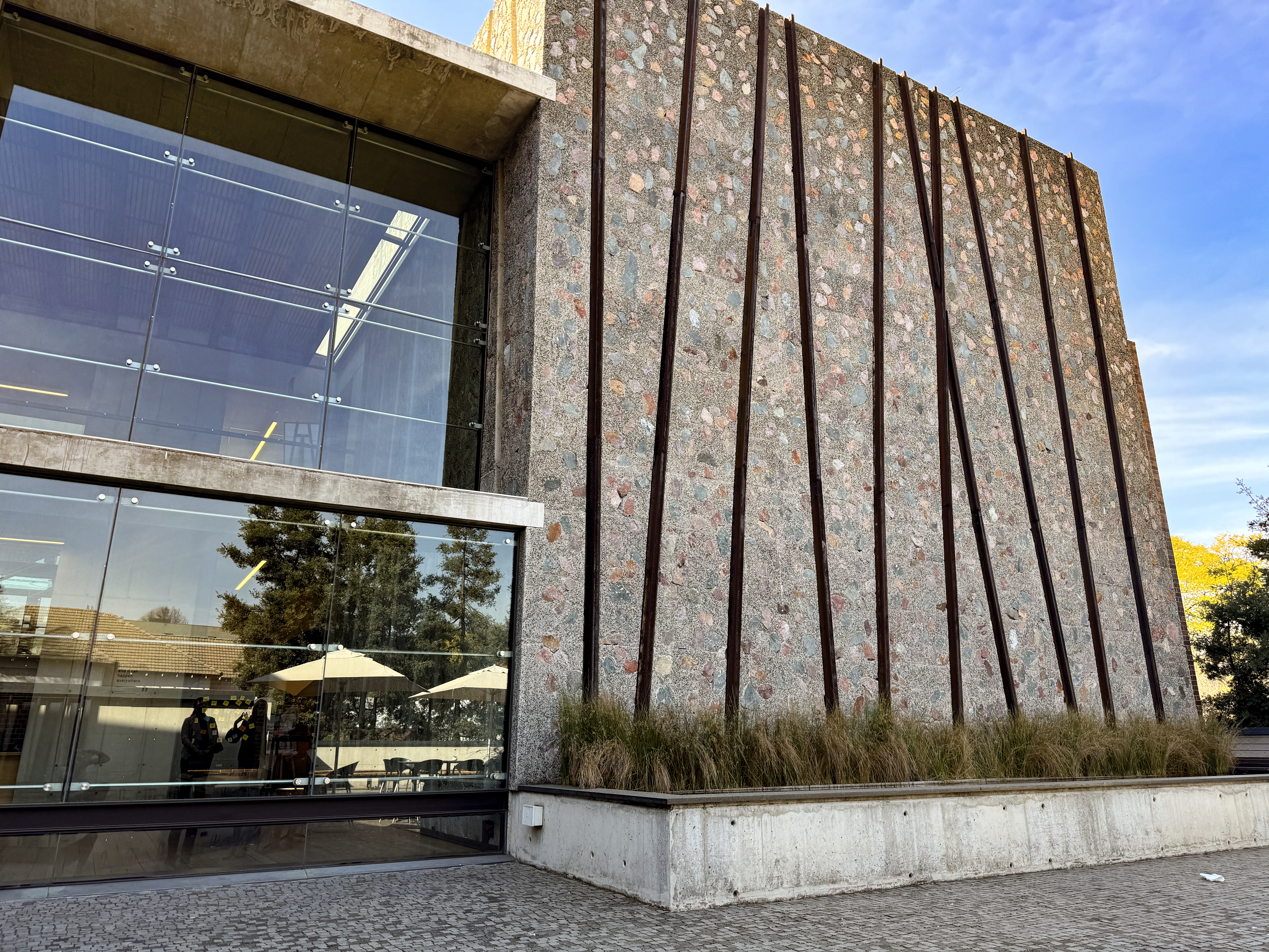
- Established: 2019
- Location: 1 Duncombe Rd; Forest Town; Johannesburg
- Coordinates: 26.1715°S 28.0332°E
- Type: Holocaust museum
- Director: Tali Nates
- Website: www.jhbholocaust.co.za

The Johannesburg Holocaust and Genocide Centre (JHGC) is a Holocaust and genocide centre situated in Forest Town in Johannesburg, South Africa. The building fronts Jan Smuts Avenue, a major road in the city. The centre opened in its permanent purpose-built site in 2019, having operated from a temporary site since 2008.

The JHGC has sister centres in Cape Town (Cape Town Holocaust Centre) and Durban (Durban Holocaust Centre), and together they form part of the association "the South African Holocaust & Genocide Foundation (SAHGF)". The SAHGF determines the educational and philosophical direction of the centre. It also conducts teacher training and is the only accredited service-provider for in-service training in Holocaust education in the country. It has trained over 5,000 teachers. The centre explores the history of genocide in the 20th century, focusing on case studies from the Holocaust and the 1994 Genocide Against the Tutsi in Rwanda (Rwandan genocide).

== History ==
The origins of the centre can be traced back to 1994. There was major public interest in an Anne Frank exhibition that opened in Johannesburg in August of that year. President Nelson Mandela and Archbishop Desmond Tutu attended the opening. The Diary of Anne Frank had also been of the books available to Robben Island prisoners. At the launch, Mandela said: "During the many years my comrades and I spent in prison, we derived inspiration from the courage and tenacity of those who challenge injustice even under the most difficult circumstances. . . . Some of us read Anne Frank's Diary on Robben Island and derived much encouragement from it."

The centre was founded by, Tali Nates, a historian and former university lecturer. She is the daughter of Moses Turner, a Holocaust survivor that was saved by Oskar Schindler. Many of her relatives were murdered at the Belzec death camp. In 2008, Nates had the idea for the centre and began operating from a temporary location and within seven years it had attracted over 35 000 students in Gauteng. The centre partnered with the City of Johannesburg to choose a location for the site. It is located on the previous site of the Bernberg Fashion Museum, started by two sisters, Anna and Theresa Bernberg, to house their fashion collections. The sisters bequeathed the property to the City on the condition that it be used as a museum or art gallery.

=== Architecture ===
The centre was designed by architect, Lewis Levin, who informed his plans by having discussions with survivors of the Holocaust and the 1994 Genocide Against the Tutsi in Rwanda. Railway lines surround the building, drawing images of the Holocaust victims that were deported by train to concentration camps. The lines are not straight and are reflected in the water of the pond and end in the sky, intended to show the endlessness of genocide.The yellowwood and Silver Birch trees also symbolise forests, as Jews and others were also murdered in forests and otherwise picturesque European landscapes. Likewise, the 1994 Genocide Against the Tutsi in Rwanda took place amid lush, natural landscapes. The hard, abrasive materials are also left exposed to highlight the harsh realities of these genocides. The burned red and blackened bricks are laid in ‘English Bond’ style, brickwork that can also be found in the ruins of the gas chambers and barracks of Auschwitz-Birkenau. The cobblestones on the ground represent the cobbled streets of many European cities. The large, rectangular granite slabs evoke tombstones and are symbolise the nameless victims and their unmarked graves. A memorial wall contains the names of child victims from the Holocaust and the 1994 Genocide Against the Tutsi in Rwanda.

=== Permanent exhibition ===
The permanent exhibition explores the history of the Holocaust and genocide in the 20th century through a thematic lens. Visitors explore history and moral choices through the personal voices of various role players – victims, perpetrators, resisters, rescuers, bystanders and others. The exhibition urges visitors to reflect on lessons from these histories and apply them to their own lives. It uses multidirectional memory to highlight the two main case studies: the Holocaust and the 1994 Genocide against the Tutsi in Rwanda. The exhibition of the Holocaust includes interviews with seven Holocaust survivors that emigrated to South Africa and Pretoria resident, Jaap van Proosdij, who saved dozens of Jews.

=== Awards ===
The Johannesburg Holocaust & Genocide Centre, and its Founder and Executive Director Tali Nates have received and been nominated for a number of prestigious awards. These include the 2017 GIfA Award for Architecture, 2018 SAIA Award of Merit, and 2018 SAIA Award for Excellence. Tali Nates, as the founder and executive director, won notable awards such as the Gratias Agit Award from the Czech Republic in 2021 (the first South African to receive the honour), the 2022 Goethe Medal, the 2023 U.S. Secretary of State's International Religious Freedom Award, the 2024 International Network of Genocide Scholars' Impact Award, and the Decoration of Honour from the Republic of Austria in 2025. All of these awards are for her work in Holocaust and genocide education.
