= Duden Park =

Park in Forest, Belgium

- Parc Duden (French); Dudenpark (Dutch)
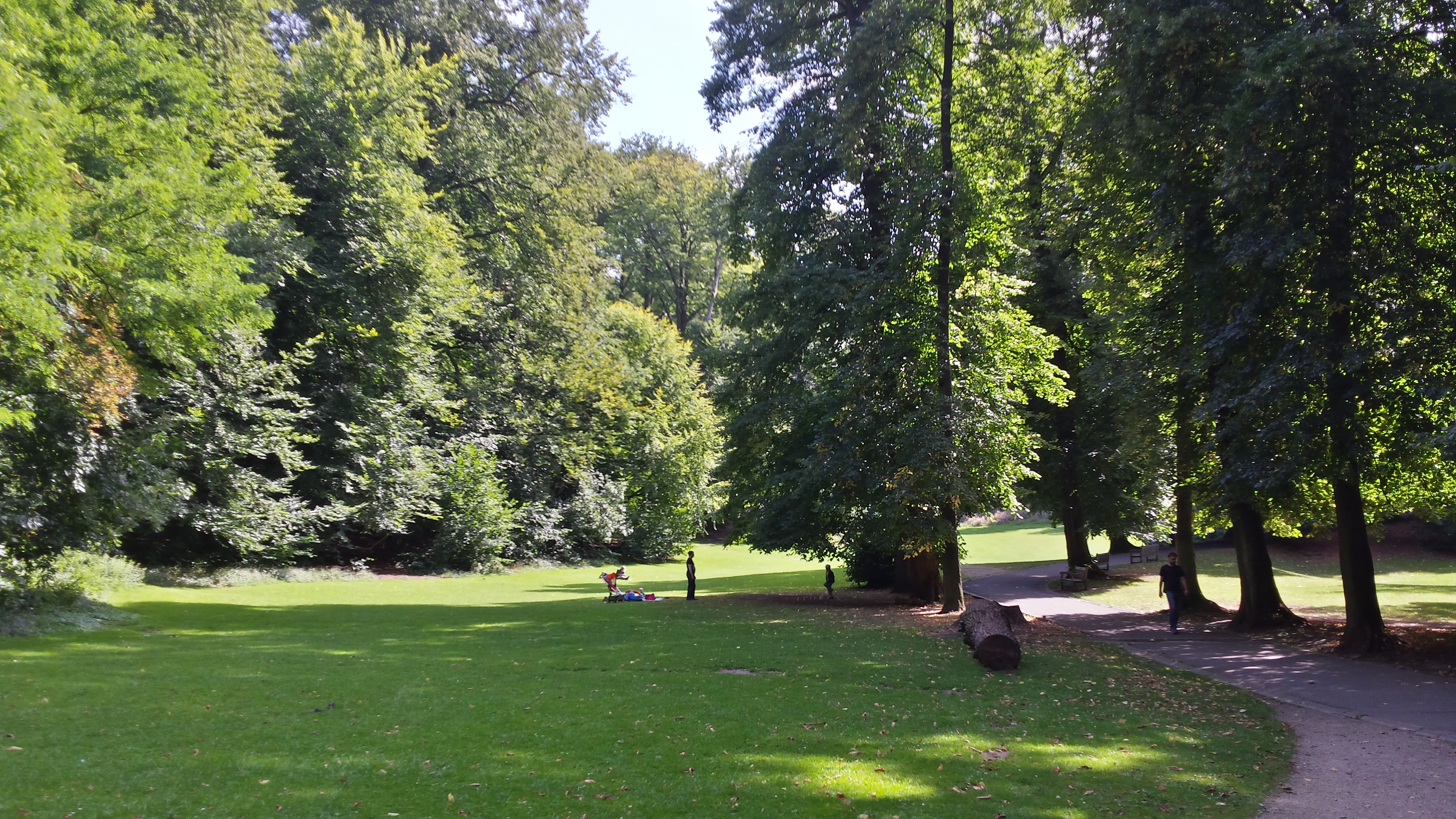
- A view of Duden Park
- Interactive map of Duden Park
- Type: Public park
- Location: Forest, Brussels-Capital Region, Belgium
- Coordinates: 50°49′01″N 4°19′52″E
- Area: 24 ha (59 acres)
- Status: Open year-round

Duden Park (French: Parc Duden; Dutch: Dudenpark) is an urban public park in the municipality of Forest in Brussels, Belgium. It covers 24 hectares (59 acres) and has a level difference of 45 metres (148 ft), with its highest point being at an elevation of 90 metres (300 ft).

Duden Park is home to the historic football club Royale Union Saint-Gilloise, with the Joseph Marien Stadium being located on the park's western side near its lowest point, at 55 metres (180 ft) elevation. The park is adjacent to Forest Park to its north.

== History ==
Until the end of the 18th century, the land belonged to Forest Abbey. In 1829, after being nationalised, the property was sold by the Société Générale to the banker Edouard Mosselman, who also acquired the Bois de la Cambre/Ter Kamerenbos. In 1823, he had a neoclassical villa built there and laid out pathways. He then sold the property to Guillaume Duden, a German merchant, who had a new château built and bequeathed it to King Leopold II in 1900, on the condition that it become a public park.

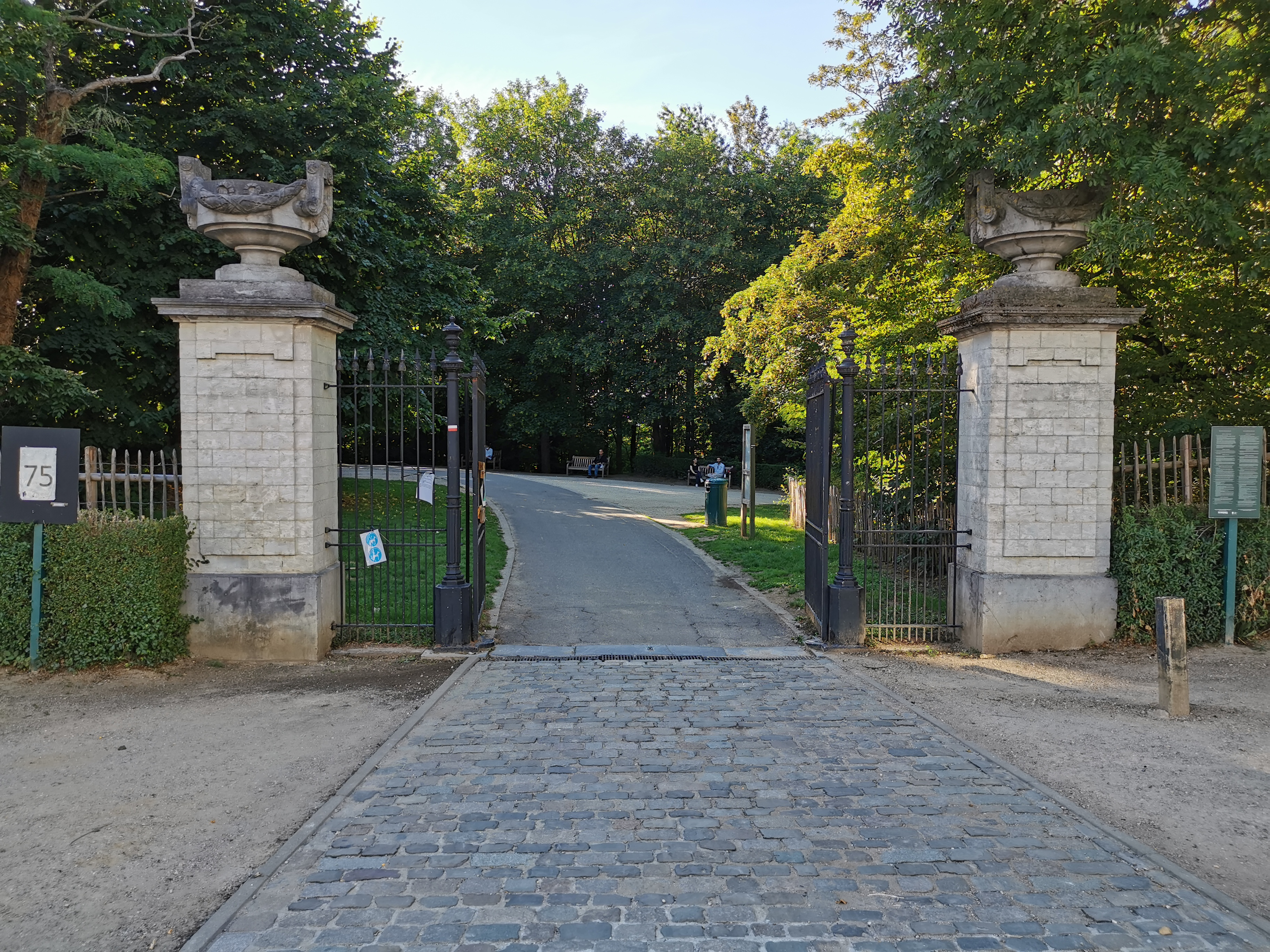
Entrance of Duden Park

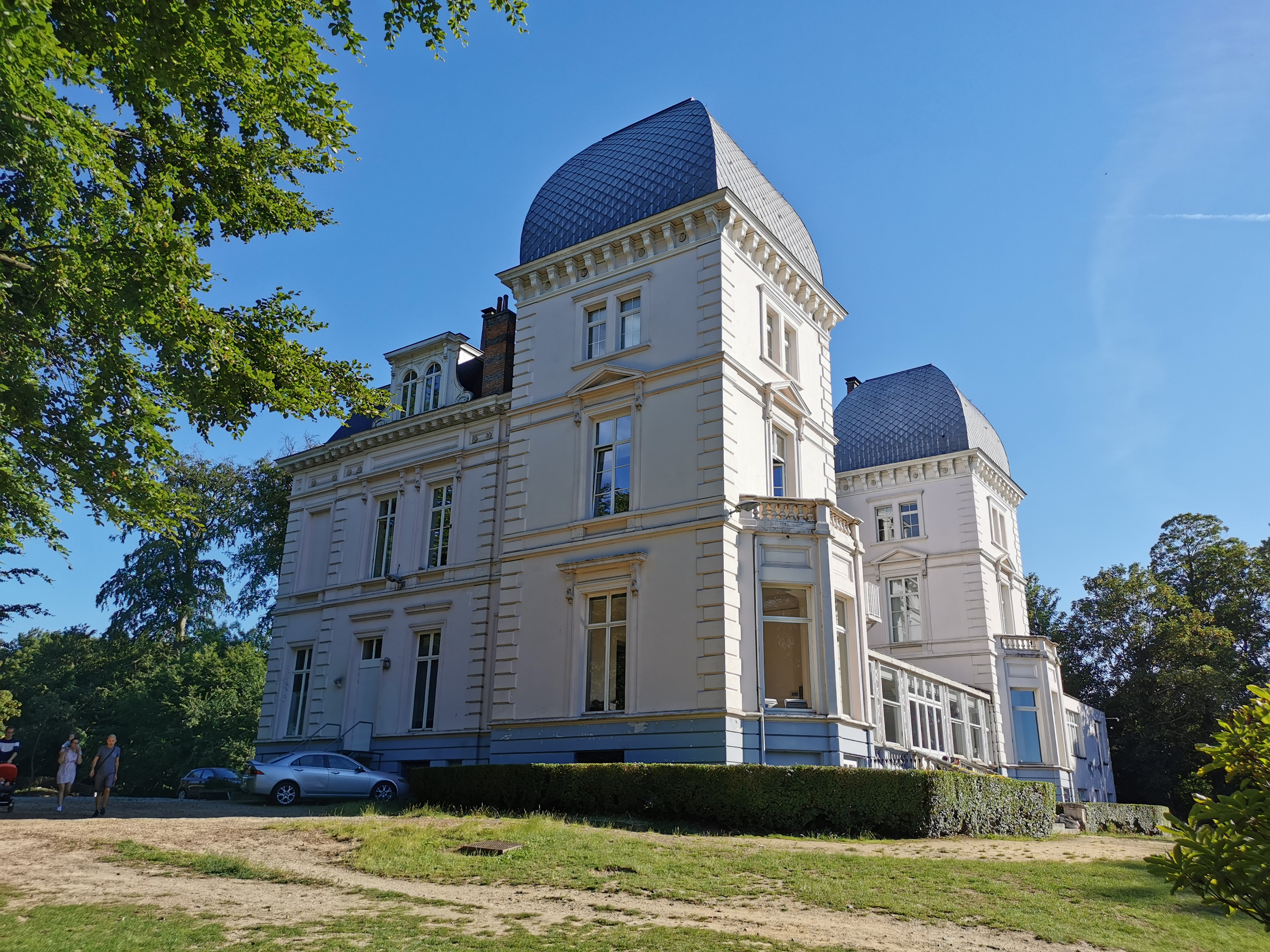
Château Duden

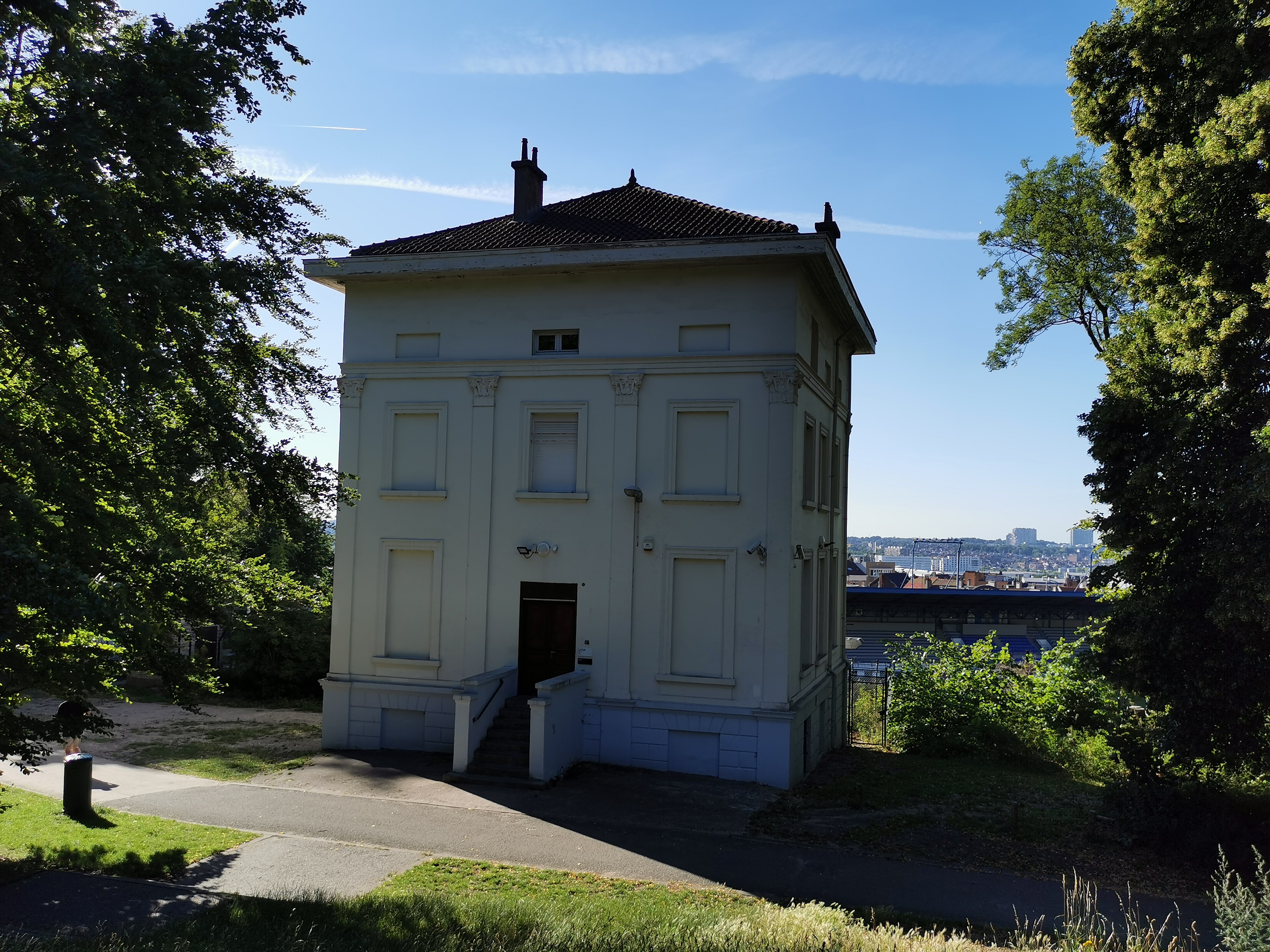
Villa Mosselman

== See also ==
- List of parks and gardens in Brussels
- History of Brussels
- Belgium in the long nineteenth century
