= Forest Town, Gauteng =

Forest Town
- Location within Gauteng Location within South Africa
- Coordinates: 26.172°S 28.037°E
- Country: South Africa
- Province: Gauteng
- Municipality: City of Johannesburg
- Main Place: Johannesburg
- Established: 1908

Area
  - Total: 0.64 km^{2} (0.25 sq mi)

Population (2011)
  - Total: 1,072
  - Density: 1,700/km^{2} (4,300/sq mi)

Racial makeup (2011)
  - Black African: 29.4%
  - Coloured: 1.2%
  - Indian/Asian: 7.7%
  - White: 58.8%
  - Other: 2.9%

First languages (2011)
  - English: 65.5%
  - Afrikaans: 9.5%
  - Zulu: 5.5%
  - Tswana: 3.1%
  - Other: 16.4%
- Time zone: UTC+2 (SAST)
- Postal code (street): 2193

Forest Town, as the name implies, is a leafy suburb of Johannesburg, South Africa. It lies between the busy thoroughfares of Jan Smuts Avenue and Oxford Road, and is bordered to one side by the Johannesburg Zoo.

== History ==
The suburb was first surveyed on land called Sachsenwald, now known as Saxonwold, in 1908. The name of the suburb is derived from the Sachsenwald plantation.

Forest Town is well known as the scene of a high-profile police raid, the Forest Town raid, on a gay party in 1966, which triggered a moral panic and led to the Apartheid government passing the Immorality Amendment Bill of 1967. The Bill criminalised all sexual activity between men, as well as extending the legislation to include lesbians. Following South Africa's first non-racial elections in 1994, all discriminatory legislation was repealed.

In 2005, the Forest Town home of Jacob Zuma, at that time deputy president of South Africa, was raided by the Scorpions in order to obtain documents for his corruption trial. Jacob Zuma, now a former president of South Africa, is currently under investigation for fraud, money laundering, racketeering, and a host of other criminal charges.

In 2019, the Johannesburg Holocaust and Genocide Centre opened in Forest Town, the centre explores the history of genocide in the 20th century, focusing on case studies from the Holocaust and the 1994 Rwandan genocide. The site was previously occupied by the Bernberg Fashion Museum, started by two Jewish sisters, Anna and Theresa Bernberg, to house their fashion collections. The sisters bequeathed the property to the City of Johannesburg on the condition that it be used as a museum or art gallery. In 2020, the Joburg Contemporary Art Foundation, a contemporary art gallery, opened in the suburb.
