= Immorality Act, 1927 =

South African law that prohibited extramarital sex between whites and other races

Parliament of South Africa
- Long title: Act to prohibit illicit carnal intercourse between Europeans and natives and other acts in relation thereto.
- Citation: Act No. 5 of 1927
- Enacted by: Parliament of South Africa
- Royal assent: 26 March 1927
- Commenced: 30 September 1927
- Repealed: 12 April 1957

Amended by
- Immorality Amendment Act, 1950

Repealed by
- Immorality Act, 1957
- Status: Repealed

The Immorality Act, 1927 (Act No. 5 of 1927) was an act of the Parliament of South Africa that prohibited extramarital sex between white people and people of other races. In its original form it only prohibited sex between a white person and a black person, but in 1950 it was amended to apply to sex between a white person and any non-white person.

The act forbade any "illicit carnal intercourse" (which meant sex outside of marriage) between a "European" (i.e. white) male and a "native" (i.e. black) female, or vice versa. It imposed a penalty of up to five years in prison for the man and four years for the woman. It also prohibited "procuring" women for the purpose of interracial sex, and knowingly allowing premises to be used for interracial sex; both offences carried a penalty of up to five years' imprisonment.

In 1950, the Nationalist government of DF Malan, in one of the first legislative acts of apartheid, introduced the Immorality Amendment Act, 1950 (Act No. 21 of 1950) to extend the prohibition to sex between "Europeans" and all "non-Europeans". This therefore included in the scope of the act people of mixed descent and people of South Asian descent. Between 1950 and the repeal of the law in 1985, at least 19,000 people were fully prosecuted for violating the law, whereas thousands more were arrested without a trial.

The 1950 amendment came one year after the passage of the Prohibition of Mixed Marriages Act, 1949, which forbade marriages between white and non-white people.

The act was repealed by the Immorality Act, 1957, section 16 of which contained a similar prohibition of sex between whites and non-whites. The prohibition was finally lifted by the Immorality and Prohibition of Mixed Marriages Amendment Act, 1985.

== See also ==
- Anti-miscegenation laws
- Immorality Act
