= Laws regarding child sexual abuse =

Laws against child sexual abuse vary by country based on the local definition of who a child is and what constitutes child sexual abuse. Most countries in the world employ some form of age of consent, with sexual contact with an underage person being criminally penalized. As the age of consent to sexual behaviour varies from country to country, so too do definitions of child sexual abuse. An adult's sexual intercourse with a minor below the legal age of consent may sometimes be referred to as statutory rape, based on the principle that any apparent consent by a minor could not be considered legal consent.

The United Nations Convention on the Rights of the Child (CRC) is an international treaty that legally obligates nations to protect children's rights. Articles 34 and 35 of the CRC require states to protect children from all forms of sexual exploitation and sexual abuse. This includes outlawing the coercion of a child to perform sexual activity, the prostitution of children, and the exploitation of children in creating pornography. States are also required to prevent the abduction, sale, or trafficking of children. As of January 23, 2015, 196 countries have ratified the Convention, including every member of the United Nations except the United States.

== Australia ==
Australian Criminal Code Act 1995 section 474.26 and 474.27 prohibits the use of a "carrier service" to communicate with the intent to procure a person under the age of 16, or expose such a person to any indecent matter for grooming. The various states and territories have similar laws, some of which use a different ages (for example the victim only has to be under 16 in Queensland). Such laws across Australia were recently strengthened in the wake of the murder of Carly Ryan.

== Canada ==
In Canada, Criminal Code section 172.1 makes it an offence to communicate with a child through a computer system to commit a sexual offence (termed "luring a child").

== Costa Rica ==
In Costa Rica, since April 2013, the Criminal Code section 167 bis, makes it an offence to seduce a child by electronic means. With penalties from one to 3 years of imprisonment for a person that, by any means attempts to establish an erotic or sexual communication with a child under 15 years old.

== Fiji ==
Fiji has recently updated its legislative standards with the introduction of the Crimes Decree (2009). This removed gendered limitations that the Penal Code had held regarding victims and offenders. It updated the maximum sentence so that any offender can face a sentence of life imprisonment for the sexual assault of a person under the age of 13. Prior to this, female offenders could only receive a maximum sentence of up to seven years imprisonment. As well as this, it included the offence of penile-anal penetration, though it does still use the degrading terminology of "sodomy". Previously, the Penal Code only considered penile-vaginal penetration. There are still limitations in Fiji regarding child sexual assault, particularly in the criminal justice practices. The use of mediation between offender, victim and the surrounding families has great potential to revictimise and retraumatise the victim.

== Germany ==
In Germany, under § 176 of the Strafgesetzbuch (Criminal Code) it is a criminal offence to entice a child (below the age of 14) into sexual actions or to use telecommunications to try to entice them into sexual actions or child pornography. In January 2020, the law was extended to include cases of attempted cyber grooming in which perpetrators "groomed" investigators or parents, believing them to be a child.

== India ==
The Protection of Children Against Sexual Offences Act, 2012 regarding child sexual abuse has been passed by both the houses of the Indian Parliament in May 2012. The Act came into force from 14 November 2012.

== Japan ==
In 2023, Japan adopted a new crime law that establishes sexual grooming, voyeurism, and asking for sexual images of children under the age of 16 as crimes.

== Malaysia ==
Few forms of child abuse are a crime under Malaysian law. Suspects can be charged only for rape (penile penetration) and incest. Police can do little since the legal definition is limited. Malaysian courts seldom convict people for child sexual abuse, and Malaysia keeps no official statistics on child abuse.

== Netherlands ==
On 1 January 2010, section 248e was added to the Dutch Criminal Code making it an offence to arrange online or by telephone a meeting with someone he knows or reasonably should assume to be a child under 16, with the intent of sexually abusing the child, as soon as any preparation for this meeting is made. The maximum punishment is 2 years of imprisonment or a fine of the fourth category.

== New Zealand ==
The law in New Zealand states that it is a crime to meet up or intend to meet up to perform an unlawful sexual act with a person under 16 years. This is recorded in Section 131B of the Crimes Act 1961. Any person charged is liable to imprisonment for a term not exceeding 7 years.

== South Africa ==
The South African law on sexual offences was codified in the Criminal Law (Sexual Offences and Related Matters) Amendment Act, 2007. Chapter 3 of the act deals with sexual offences against children. The act criminalises:

- acts of sexual penetration with a child (statutory rape)
- other sexual acts with a child (statutory sexual assault)
- exploitation of children in prostitution
- sexual grooming of children
- showing pornography to children
- using children in child pornography
- compelling children to witness sexual acts
- indecent exposure to children

The act establishes a National Register for Sex Offenders which lists people convicted of sexual offences against children and the mentally disabled.

== Turkey ==
Turkey's constitutional court decided in 2016 to annul the provision that punishes all sexual acts against children under the age of 15 as sexual abuse, according to opposition media. According to the government, they are preparing a new law more efficient against child abuse and the prohibition is still in place.

== United Kingdom ==
The United Kingdom rewrote its criminal code in the Sexual Offences Act of 2003. This Act includes definitions and penalties for child sexual abuse offences, and (so far as relating to offences) applies to England and Wales and Northern Ireland. The Scottish Law Commission published its review of rape and sexual offences in December 2007, which includes a similar consolidation and codification of child sexual abuse offences in Scotland.

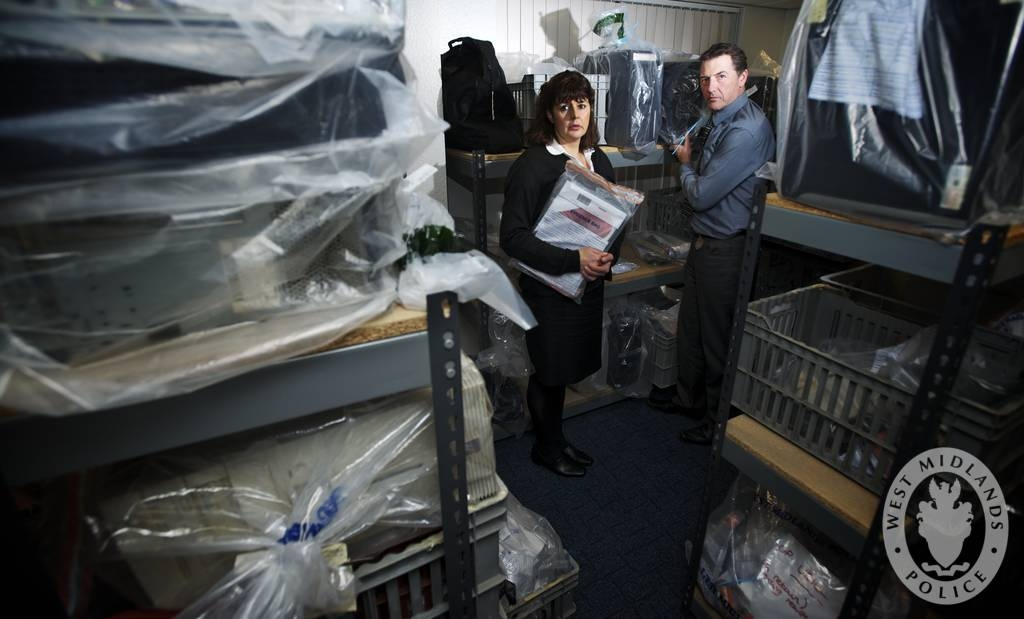
Detective Inspector Kay Wallace surrounded by computers, mobile phones and digital storage devices seized from the homes of suspected child sex abusers. Online grooming of children via chat rooms and webcams is an area COST team officers are encountering more and more.

In England and Wales, sections 14 and 15 of the Sexual Offences Act 2003 make it an offence to arrange a meeting with a child under 16, for oneself or someone else, with the intent of sexually abusing the child. The meeting itself is also an offence in its own right. The offence carries a maximum sentence of 10 years imprisonment and automatic barring of the offender from working with children or vulnerable adults.

The Protection of Children and Prevention of Sexual Offences (Scotland) Act 2005 introduced a similar provision for Scotland.

Thus, a crime may be committed even without the meeting taking place and without the child being involved in the meeting (for example, if a police officer has taken over the contact and pretends to be that child). In R v T (2005) EWCA Crim 2681, the appellant, aged 43, had pretended to befriend a nine-year-old girl but had done very little with her before she became suspicious and reported his approaches. He had many previous convictions (including one for rape) and was described as a "relentless, predatory pedophile". The Court of Appeal upheld a sentence of eight years' imprisonment with an extended license period of two years.

== United States ==
Child sexual abuse has been recognized specifically as a type of child maltreatment in U.S. federal law since the initial Congressional hearings on child sex in 1973. Child sexual abuse is illegal in every state, as well as under federal law. Among the states, the specifics of child sexual abuse laws vary, but certain features of these laws are common to all states.

== Yemen ==
In Yemen, the law does not define child abuse.

== Zambia ==
A recent June 30, 2008 landmark decision by judge, Philip Musonda, of the Zambian High Court gave a minor girl-student 45 million Zambian Kwacha (c. US$ 2 million) in awards after she brought her teacher to court for statutory rape. This is the first case of its kind for a minor to win against a person of authority in the nation of Zambia.
