= Jerry Tsie =

South African actor(born 1967)

- Born: Jerry Tsie; 1967 (age 58–59); Kutlwanong, Odalendaalsrus, Free State, South Africa
- Occupations: Actor, producer
- Known for: Mohlolohadi, Le tla o tjhabela, Masakeng

Jerry Tsie (1967) is a South African actor and producer from Kutlwanong (Odalendaalsrus), Free State, South Africa. He is known for his work in Sesotho television dramas, including Mohlolohadi, Le tla o tjhabela and Masakeng.

== Early life ==
Jerry Tsie was born in 1967 in Kutlwanong, Odalendaalsrus, in the Free State province of South Africa.

In 1988 Tsie fell in love with a white woman, Annette Heunis. This caused local and international outcry, as South Africa criminalized love and relationships across racial lines. Although the Prohibition of Mixed Marriages Act, Act No. 55 of 1949, and the Immorality Act came to an end in 1985, they banned marriage and sexual contact between Whites and non-Whites to enforce racial segregation and the "purity" of the White race, leading to arrests, jail time, and societal ostracization for couples, with police even raiding homes to catch violators. Annette Heunis left her family to live with Tsie, in the Black township of Kutlwanong in the Orange Free State. This incident was turned into a movie called Mixed Feelings, released in 1991.

== Career ==
Jerry Tsie is active in the South African film and television industry as both an actor and a producer. He has appeared in and produced Sesotho-language television dramas and has been involved in local stage and screen projects.

In 2025 Tsie launched his book on farming, Omnia Verita.

=== Television ===
- Mohlolohadi
- Le tla o tjhabela
- Masakeng

=== Films ===
- Who Am I? (1998)
- American Ninja 3: Blood Hunt (1989).
