= Miscegenation =

Interbreeding of different races or ethnic groups

Miscegenation (/mɪˌsɛdʒəˈneɪʃən/ miss-EJ-ə-NAY-shən) is genetic admixture between people who are members of different races or ethnicities. Long-term genetic and cultural admixture has been a widespread feature of human populations across much of the world, while only a few geographically or culturally isolated regions show limited historical intermixing. Historically, miscegenation has sometimes been subject to controversy or legal prohibition, typically in societies with strict racial/ethnic separation, systems of caste, or cultures of social conservatism. Adjectives describing miscegenation include "inter-ethnic", "mixed-race", "multiethnic", "multiracial", and "interracial".

== Etymology ==
The English word miscegenation derives from the Latin words miscere ("to mix") and genus ("kind" or "lineage"). The misconception, occasionally encountered, that the mis in miscegenation derives from the English prefix mis-, meaning "bad or wrong", is incorrect; the Latin term miscere is etymologically unrelated and carries no such connotation.

=== History ===
During the American Civil War (1861–1865), the word miscegenation became common usage in American English through the political propaganda pamphlet Miscegenation: The Theory of the Blending of the Races, Applied to the American White Man and Negro (1864), which advocated for racial admixture through black–white interracial marriage to create a racially homogeneous American people. In the course of senatorial and presidential party politics in 1864, the Democratic Party realized the miscegenation hoax in effort to discredit the Republican Party by imputing to them politically radical social policies that would offend the racial sensibilities of both the white-supremacist voters and the white abolitionist voters.

Throughout the 1858–1859 US Senate elections, the opponents of candidate Abraham Lincoln continually accused him and the Republican Party of advocating miscegenation as national policy. In the fourth of the Lincoln–Douglas debates (1858), candidate Lincoln stated his support for the Illinois law that prohibited "the marrying of white people with negroes". Despite the pro-miscegenation propaganda published against the abolitionist Republican Party in the Northern United States and in the Confederate States of America, after Lincoln's election to office in November 1864, the hoax-pamphlet was exposed as the work of the reporter George Wakeman and of David Goodman Croly, the managing editor of the New York World newspaper, who were associates of the Democratic Party.

In the early 19th century, before publication of the pamphlet Miscegenation (1864), the terms racial intermixing and amalgamation were the general synonyms for "the mixing of the races". In the opinion of the writer Ralph Waldo Emerson, the metaphoric usage of amalgamation describes the US as an ethnic and racial smelting-pot. Moreover, in the racialist social politics of the civil-war era US, political usage of the term miscegenation (black–white intermarriage) was meant to provoke opposition to the civil war meant to free the slaves.

=== In other languages ===
In Hispanoamerica, the term mestizaje (miscegenation) derives from the word mestizo (a person born to an Amerindian and a Spaniard), hence the national populations of the countries that are Hispanoamerica usually are genetically 18 per cent Native American and 65.10 per cent Iberian in ancestry. The terms for racial mixing – the Spanish mestizaje, the Portuguese mestiçagem, and the French métissage — derive from the Late Latin word mixticius (“mixed”), which also is the Latin root-word for the Spanish word mestizo (a man of mixed race). Moreover, Portuguese language also uses the term miscigenação, derived from miscere, the Latin root-word for the English word miscegenation. Historically, these racialist terms were functionally integral to the system of racial castes (casta) with which the Spanish and the Portuguese colonists described and classified the racial lineages of the native peoples of colonial Hispanoamerica.

The differences of denotation and connotation among the racialist terms confirm the malleability of the social interpretations of race and ethnic group, and confirm the observations of the Comte de Montlosier, who equated the social-class difference in 18th-century monarchical France with the racial-caste difference practiced in the settler colonies of the European empires.

== Anti-miscegenation laws ==
In the US, civil laws that proscribed "the mixing of the races" were enforced until 1967; in Nazi Germany (1933–1945) the Nuremberg Laws were effective from 1935 until 1945; in Fascist Italy (1922–1945) the Italian racial laws were in effect from 1938 until 1944 and in the successor Italian Social Republic in effect from 1943 until 1945; and in post-war Apartheid South Africa (1948-1994), the anti-miscegenation laws were in effect from 1949 until 1985.

In the US, the anti-miscegenation laws prohibited marriages between White Americans and Black people, Native Americans, and Asians. The Maryland General Assembly criminalized interracial marriage in 1691 being one of the first turning points for Anti-Miscegenation laws in the United States. In the 20th century, from 1913 until 1948, of the forty-eight states of the Union, thirty enforced their state laws against interracial marriage. Although an anti-miscegenation amendment to the US Constitution was proposed and failed in 1871, the amendment was re-proposed in the 1912–1913 period and again in 1928. In 1967, in the case of Loving v. Virginia, the US Supreme Court unanimously ruled that anti-miscegenation laws are unconstitutional by way of the Fourteenth Amendment (1868).

In Nazi Germany, the Nuremberg Laws, specifically The Law for the Protection of German Blood and German Honour (1935) prohibited interracial sexual relations and interracial marriages. According to the Nuremberg Laws, the Jews were classified as a race forbidden to have sexual relations and marriages with persons classified as Aryans, and with persons classified as non-Aryans. Violators of the laws were condemned as Rassenschande (guilty of shaming their race) and usually were imprisoned and then faced deportation to Nazi concentration camps for their eventual death.

In Apartheid South Africa, the Prohibition of Mixed Marriages Act (1949) prohibited intermarriages between white South Africans and any person of the many racial and ethnic groups who were the majority population of the country. The Immorality Act (1950) criminalized interracial sexual relations; in the event, both Acts were repealed in 1985.

== Demographics of ethnoracial admixture ==
=== United States ===
According to the US census, in 2000 there were 504,119 Asian–white marriages, 287,576 black-white marriages, and 31,271 Asian–black marriages. The black–white marriages increased from 65,000 in 1970 to 403,000 in 2006, and 558,000 in 2010, according to Census Bureau figures.

In the United States, rates of interracial cohabitation are significantly higher than those of marriage. Although only 7 percent of married African American men have white American wives, 13% of cohabitating African American men have white American partners. 25% of married Asian American women have white spouses, but 45% of cohabitating Asian American women are with white American men. Of cohabiting Asian men, slightly over 37% of Asian men have white female partners over 10% married White American women. Asian American women and Asian American men who live with a white partner, 40 and 27 percent, respectively (Le, 2006b). In 2008, of new marriages including an Asian man, 80% were to an Asian spouse and 14% to a White spouse; of new marriages involving an Asian woman, 61% were to an Asian spouse and 31% to a White spouse. Almost 30% of Asians and Latinos outmarry, with 86.8 and 90% of these, respectively, being to a white person. According to Karyn Langhorne Folan, "although the most recent census available reported that 70% of African American women are single, African American women have the greatest resistance to marrying 'out' of the race."

One survey revealed that 19% of black men had engaged in sexual activity with white women. A Gallup poll on interracial dating in June 2006 found 75% of Americans approving of a white man dating a black woman, and 71% approving of a black man dating a white woman. Among people between the ages of 18 and 29, the poll found that 95% approved of blacks and whites dating, and about 60% said they had dated someone of a different race. 69% of Hispanics, 52% of non-Hispanic blacks, and 45% of non-Hispanic whites said they had dated someone of another race or ethnic group. In 1980, just 17% of all respondents said they had dated someone from a different racial background.

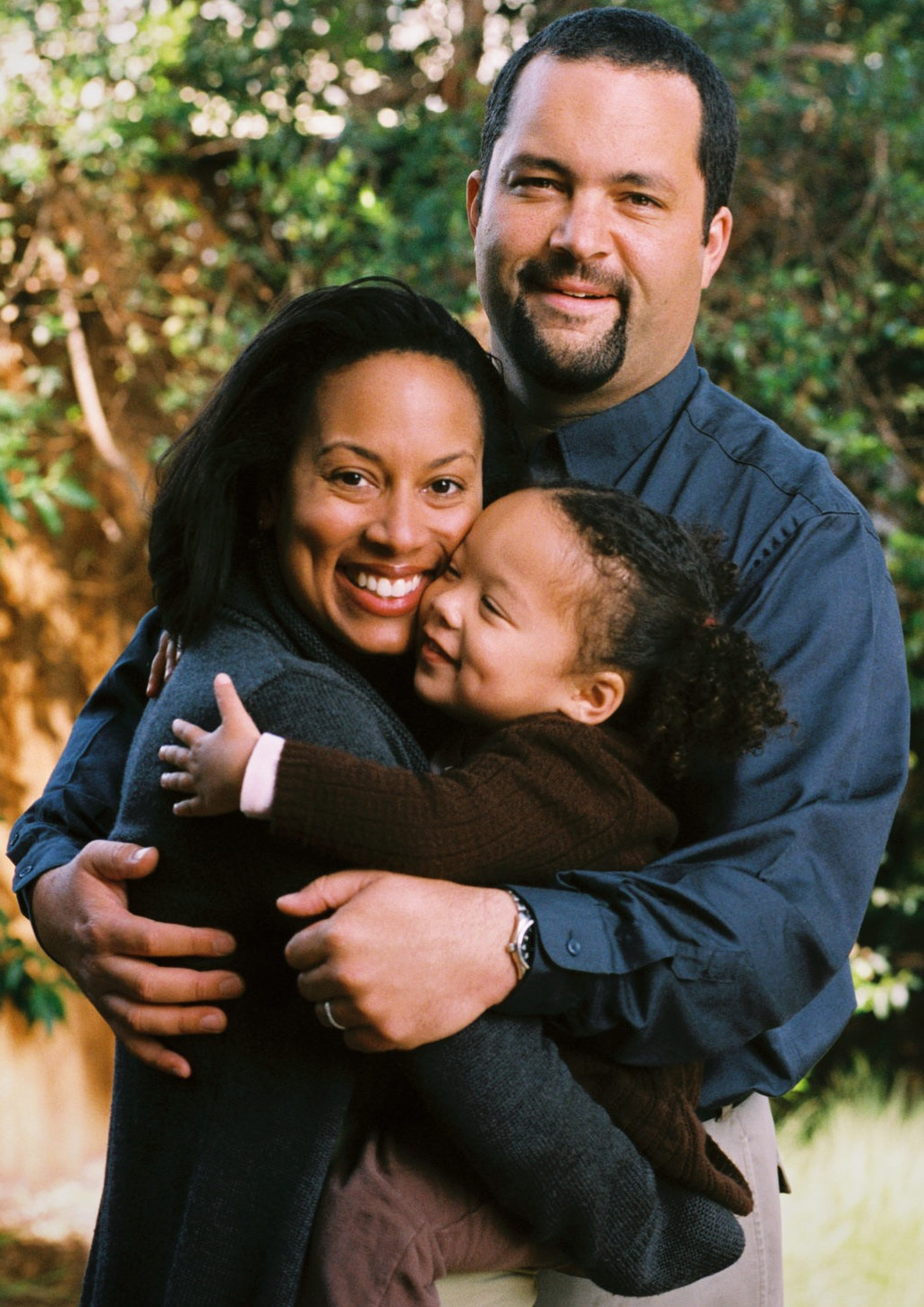
Former NAACP President Ben Jealous, pictured here with his wife and daughter, is the son of a white father and a biracial mother.

However, according to a study from the University of California at Berkeley, using data from over 1 million profiles of singles from online dating websites, whites were far more reluctant to date outside their race than non-whites. The study found that over 80% of whites, including whites who stated no racial preference, contacted other whites, whereas about 3% of whites contacted blacks, a result that held for younger and older participants. Only 5% of whites responded to inquiries from blacks. Black participants were ten times more likely to contact whites than whites were to contact blacks, however black participants sent inquiries to other blacks more often than otherwise.

Interracial marriage is still relatively uncommon, despite the increasing rate. In 2010, 15% of new marriages were interracial, and of those only 9% of Whites married outside of their race. However, this takes into account inter ethnic marriages, meaning it counts white Hispanics marrying non-Hispanic whites as interracial marriages, despite both bride and groom being racially white. Of the 275,000 new interracial marriages in 2010, 43% were white-Hispanic, 14.4% were white-Asian, 11.9% were white-black and the rest were other combinations. However, interracial marriage has become more common over the past decades due to increasing racial diversity, and liberalizing attitudes toward the practice. The number of interracial marriages in the United States increased by 65% between 1990 and 2000, and by 20% between 2000 and 2010. "A record 14.6% of all new marriages in the United States in 2008 were between spouses of a different race or ethnicity from one another. ... Rates more than doubled among whites and nearly tripled among blacks between 1980 and 2008. But for both Hispanics and Asians, rates were nearly identical in 2008 and 1980", according to a Pew Research Center analysis of demographic data from the U.S. Census Bureau.

According to studies by Jenifer L. Bratter and Rosalind B. King made publicly available on the Education Resources Information Center, White female-Black male and White female-Asian male marriages are more prone to divorce than White-White pairings. Conversely, unions between White males and non-White females (and between Hispanics and non-Hispanic persons) have similar or lower risks of divorce than White-White marriages, unions between white male-black female last longer than white-white pairings or white-Asian pairings.

The sociology indicates that interracial marriage often is disapproved of and discouraged by both the White community and the Black community, but to different degrees of opposition; that, unlike White people, Black people will more likely disapprove of interracial marriage as socially disruptive. However, any sort of opposition to interracial marriage is now much lower in the US than it used to be.

=== Brazil ===
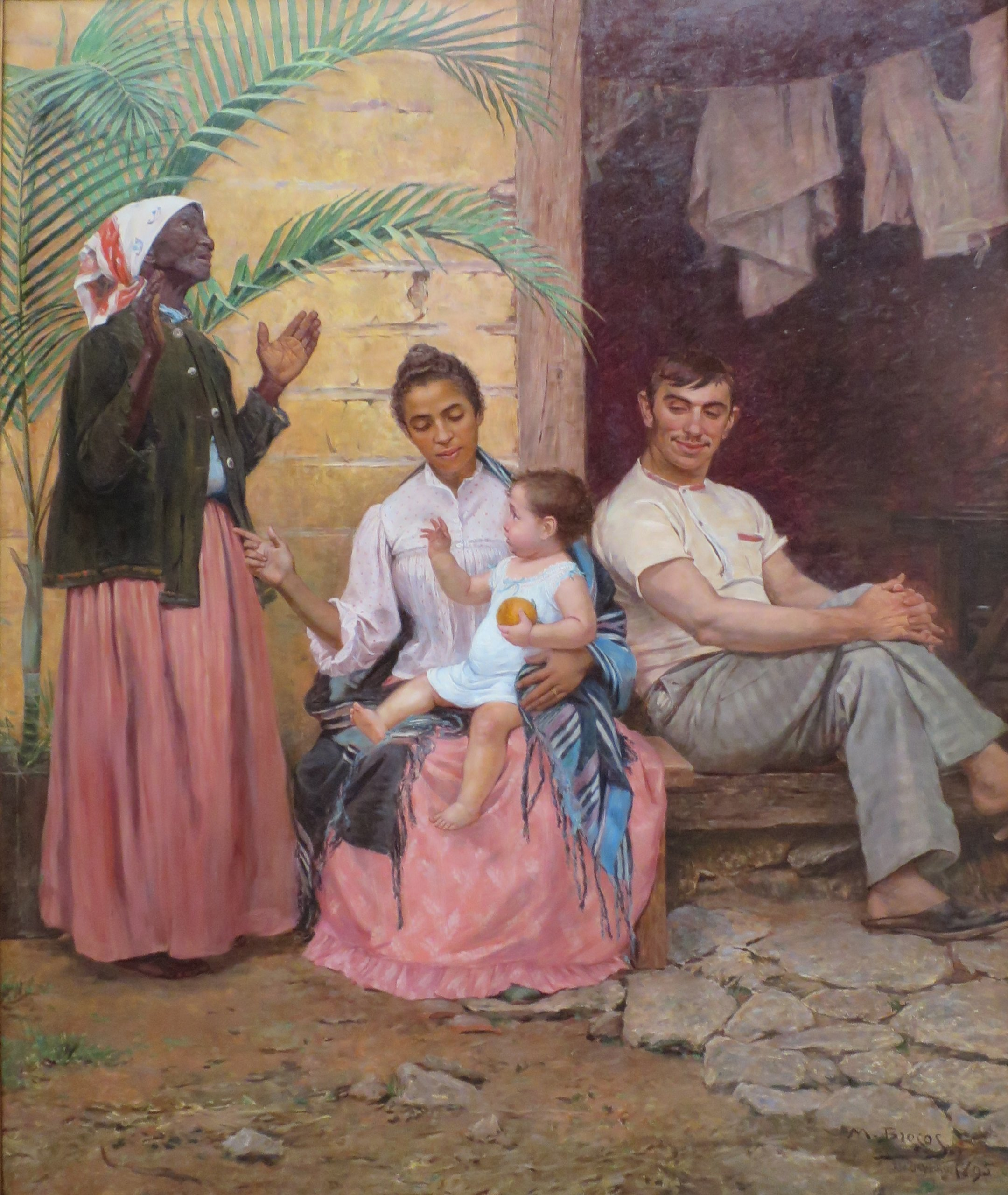
A Redenção de Cam (Ham's Redemption), Modesto Brocos, 1895, Museu Nacional de Belas Artes. The painting depicts a black grandmother, mulatta mother, white father and their quadroon child, hence three generations of hypergamy through racial whitening.

In addition to the chattel slavery of Africans that existed until the late 19th century, the Portuguese caste system codified legal, social, and economic discrimination against the non-white natives of Brazil. Moreover, because interracial marriage was common from the time of the first Portuguese colonizers, that social circumstance allowed social mobility for "mixed-race" people, such as the Afro-Brazilians, by way of the socio-economic phenomenon of the "mulatto escape hatch".

In the 2022 census, 92.1 million people or 45.3% of Brazil's population identified themselves as "pardos", meaning brown or mixed race. According to some DNA researches, Brazilians predominantly possess some degree of mixed-race ancestry, though less than half of the country's population classified themselves as "pardos" in the census. Multiracial Brazilians live in all regions of Brazil, they are mainly people of mixed European, African, East Asian (mostly Japanese) and Amerindian ancestry.

Long-term statistical data in Brazil show a steady increase in exogamous unions over a fifty-year period. While mixed-race marriages represented only 8.2% of all marriages in 1960, they rose to 22.6% in 2000. At the turn of the century, 15.7% of blacks, 24.4% of whites, and 27.6% of pardos (mixed-race/brown) married someone of a different race.

By 2010, interracial marriages accounted for 30.7% of all marriages in Brazil. However, significant disparities persisted, with most interracial marriages occurring between pardos (mixed-race individuals) and whites, particularly between white women and pardo men. According to the 2010 Census, endogamy rates remained high among whites (74.5%). Data from the 2022 National Household Survey indicate that the overall rate of interracial unions has remained stable at approximately 30% since 2010. Demographers attribute these shifting marriage patterns to broader changes in the country's ethnic composition. Between 2000 and 2022, the proportion of the population identifying as white declined from 53.7% to 43.5%, while the proportion identifying as pardo increased from 38.5% to 45.3%, making pardos the country's largest self-identified ethnic group.

== Genetic admixture ==
Sexual reproduction between two populations reduces the genetic distance between the populations. During the Age of Discovery which began in the early 15th century, European explorers sailed all across the globe reaching all the major continents. In the process they came into contact with many populations that had been isolated for thousands of years. The Tasmanian Aboriginals were one of the most isolated groups on the planet. Many died from disease and conflict, but a number of their descendants survive today as multiracial people of Tasmanian and European descent. This is an example of how modern migrations may reduce the genetic divergence of the humans, which would usually lead to speciation.

New World demographics were radically changed within a short time following the voyage of Columbus. The colonization of the Americas brought Native Americans into contact with the distant populations of Europe, Africa, and Asia. As a result, many countries in the Americas have significant and complex multiracial populations.

=== Admixture in the United States ===
Genetic studies indicate that many African Americans possess varying degrees of European admixture, although it is suggested that the Native American admixture in African Americans is exaggerated. Some estimates from studies indicated that many of the African Americans who took part, had European admixture ranging from 25 to 50% in the Northeast and less than 10% in the South (where a vast majority of the population reside). A 2003 study by Mark D. Shriver of a European-American sample found that the average admixture in the individuals who participated was 0.7% African and 3.2% Native American. However, 70% of the sample had no African admixture. The other 30% had African admixture ranging from 2% to 20% with an average of 2.3%. By extrapolating these figures to the whole population some scholars suggest that up to 74 million European-Americans may have African admixture in the same range (2–20%). Recently J.T. Frudacas, Shriver's partner in DNA Print Genomics, contradicted him stating "Five percent of European Americans exhibit some detectable level of African ancestry."

Historians estimate that 58% of enslaved women in the United States aged 15–30 years were sexually assaulted by their slave owners and other White men. One such slave owner, Thomas Jefferson, fathered his slave Sally Hemings' child. While publicly opposed to race mixing, in his Notes on the State of Virginia published in 1785, Jefferson wrote: "The improvement of the blacks in body and mind, in the first instance of their mixture with the whites, has been observed by every one, and proves that their inferiority is not the effect merely of their condition of life".

Within the African American population, the amount of African admixture is directly correlated with darker skin since less selective pressure against dark skin is applied within the group of "non-passing" individuals. Thus, African Americans may have a much wider range of African admixture (>0–100%), whereas European-Americans have a lower range (2–20%).

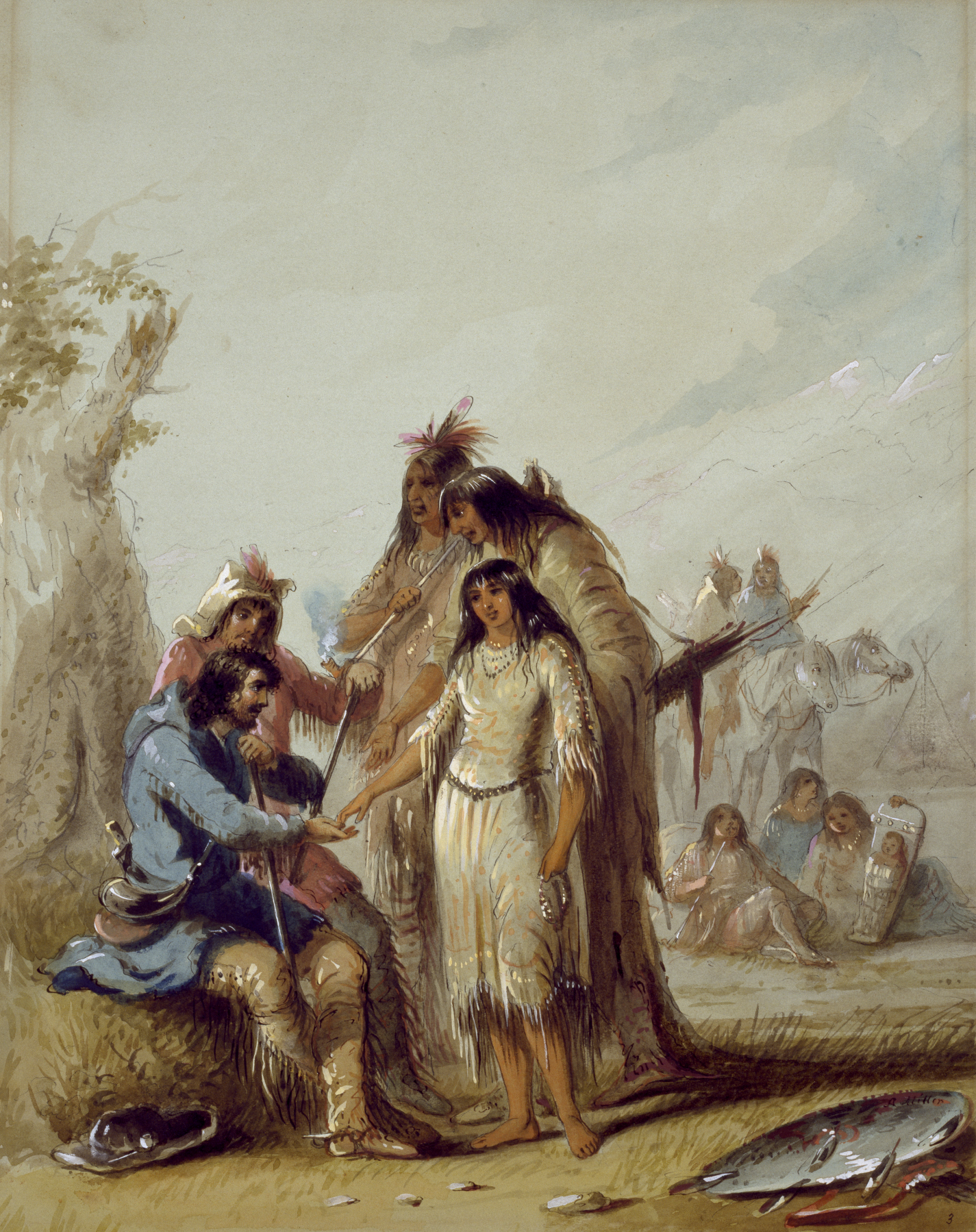
The Trapper's Bride shows a trapper, Francois, paying $600 in trade goods for an Indian woman to be his wife, c. 1837.

A statistical analysis done in 1958 using historical census data and historical data on immigration and birth rates concluded that 21% of the white population had black ancestors. The growth in the White population could not be attributed to births in the White population and immigration from Europe alone, but had received significant contribution from the African American population as well. The author states in 1958:

The data presented in this study indicate that the popular belief in the non-African background of white persons is invalid. Over twenty-eight million white persons are descendants of persons of African origin. Furthermore, the majority of the persons with African ancestry are classified as White.

A 2003 study on Y-chromosomes and mtDNA detected no African admixture in the European-Americans who took part in it. The sample included 628 European American Y-chromosomes and mtDNA from 922 European Americans According to a genome-wide study by 23andMe, White Americans (European Americans) who participated were: "98.6 percent European, 0.19 percent African and 0.18 percent Native American on average."

In the United States, intermarriage among Filipinos with other races is common. They have the largest number of interracial marriages among Asian immigrant groups, as documented in California. It is also noted that 21.8% of Filipino Americans are of mixed blood, second among Asian Americans, and is the fastest growing.

=== Admixture in Latin America ===
==== Background ====
Prior to the European conquest of the Americas the demographics of Latin America was naturally 100% American Indian. Today those who identify themselves as Native Americans are small minorities in many countries. For example, the CIA lists Argentina's at 0.9%, Brazil's at 0.4%, and Uruguay's at 0%. However, the range varies widely from country to country in Latin America with some countries having significantly larger Amerindian minorities.

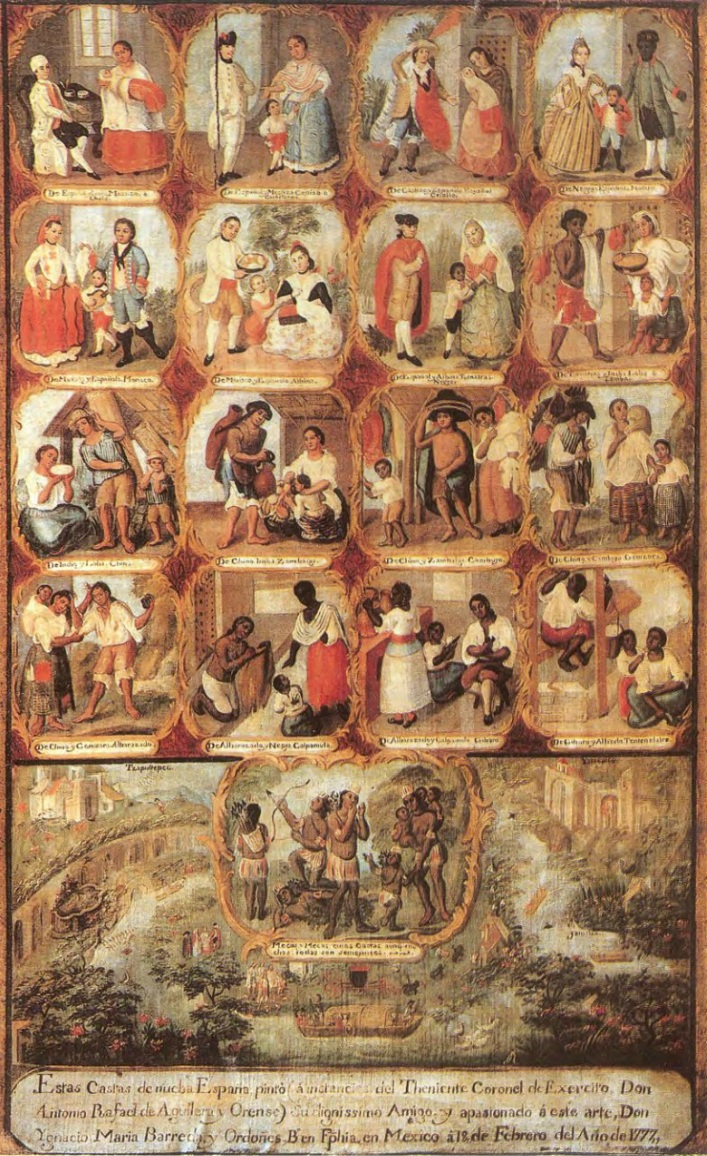
Depiction of casta system in Mexico, 18th century

The early conquest of Latin America was primarily carried out by male soldiers and sailors from Spain and Portugal. Since they carried very few European women on their journeys the new settlers married and fathered children with Amerindian women and also with women taken by force from Africa. This process of miscegenation was even encouraged by the Spanish Monarchy. Many Amerindian languages were lost as mixed race offspring adopted Spanish and Portuguese as their first languages. Only towards the end of the 19th century and beginning of the 20th century did large numbers of Europeans begin to migrate to South America and consequently altering its demographics.

In addition many Africans were shipped to regions all over the Americas and were present in many of the early voyages of the conquistadors. Brazil has the largest population of African descendants outside Africa. Other countries such as Jamaica, Cuba, Puerto Rico, Dominican Republic, Haiti, Venezuela, Colombia, and Ecuador still have sizeable populations identified as Black. However countries such as Argentina do not have a visible African presence today. Census information from the early 19th century shows that people categorized as Black made up to 30% of the population, or around 400,000 people. Though almost completely absent today, their contribution to Argentine culture is significant and include the tango, the milonga and the zamba, words of Bantu origin.

Demographics of Brazil in 1835, 1940, 2000 and 2008
Year	White	Brown	Black
1835	24.4%	18.2%	51.4%
1940	64%	21%	14%
2000	53.7%	38.5%	6.2%
2008	48.8%	43.8%	6.5%

The ideology of whitening encouraged non-whites to seek white or lighter skinned partners. This dilution of non-white admixture would be beneficial to their offspring as they would face less stigmatization and find it easier to assimilate into mainstream society. After successive generations of European gene flow, non-white admixture levels would drop below levels at which skin color or physical appearance is not affected thus allowing individuals to identify as White. In many regions, the native and black populations were simply overwhelmed by a succession of waves of European immigration.

Historians and scientists are thus interested in tracing the fate of Native Americans and Africans from the past to the future. The questions remain about what proportion of these populations simply died out and what proportion still has descendants alive today including those who do not racially identify themselves as their ancestors would have. Admixture testing has thus become a useful objective tool in shedding light on the demographic history of Latin America.

==== Recent studies ====
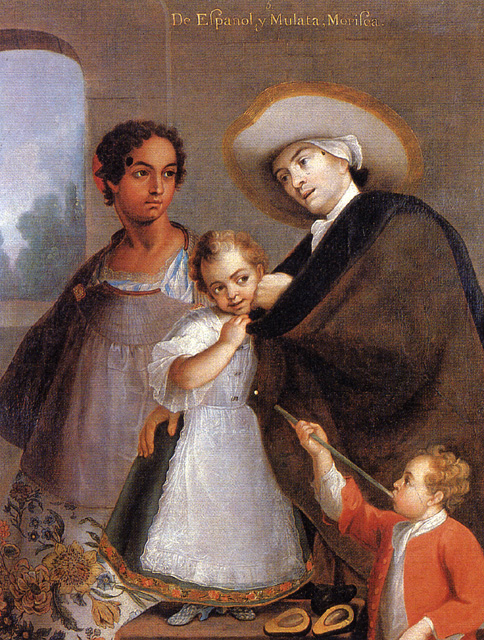
A Spaniard plays with his mixed-race daughter while his Mulatta wife looks on, Miguel Cabrera, 1763, Colonial Mexico.

Unlike the United States, there were no anti-miscegenation policies in Latin America. Though still a racially stratified society there were no significant barriers to gene flow between the three populations. As a result, admixture profiles are a reflection of the colonial populations of Africans, Europeans and Amerindians. The pattern is also sex biased in that the African and Amerindian maternal lines are found in significantly higher proportions than African or Amerindian Y chromosomal lines. This is an indication that the primary mating pattern was that of European males with Amerindian or African females. According to the study more than half the White populations of the Latin American countries studied have some degree of either Native American or African admixture (MtDNA or Y chromosome). In countries such as Chile and Colombia almost the entire white population was shown to have some non-white admixture.

Frank Moya Pons, a Dominican historian documented that Spanish colonists intermarried with Taíno women, and, over time, these mestizo descendants intermarried with Africans, creating a tri-racial Creole culture. 1514 census records reveal that 40% of Spanish men in the colony of Santo Domingo had Taíno wives. A 2002 study conducted in Puerto Rico suggests that over 61% of the population possess Amerindian mtDNA.

=== Admixture in the Philippines ===
Historically, admixture has been a common phenomenon in the Philippines. The Philippines were originally settled by Australoid peoples called Negritos which now form the country's aboriginal community. Admixture occurred between this earlier group and the mainstream Malayo-Polynesian population.

There has been Indian migration to and influence in the Philippines since the precolonial era. About 25% of the words in the Tagalog language are Sanskrit terms and about 5% of the country's population possess Indian ancestry from antiquity. There has been a Chinese presence in the Philippines since the 9th century. However, large-scale migrations of Chinese to the Philippines only started during the Spanish colonial era, when the world market was opened to the Philippines. It is estimated that among Filipinos, 10%–20% have some Chinese ancestry and 1.5% are "full-blooded" Chinese.

According to the American anthropologist Dr. H. Otley Beyer, the ancestry of Filipinos is 2% Arab. This dates back to when Arab traders intermarried with the local Malay Filipino female populations during the pre-Spanish history of the Philippines. A recent genetic study by Stanford University indicates that at least 3.6% of the population are European or of part European descent from both Spanish and United States colonization.

=== Admixture among the Romani people ===
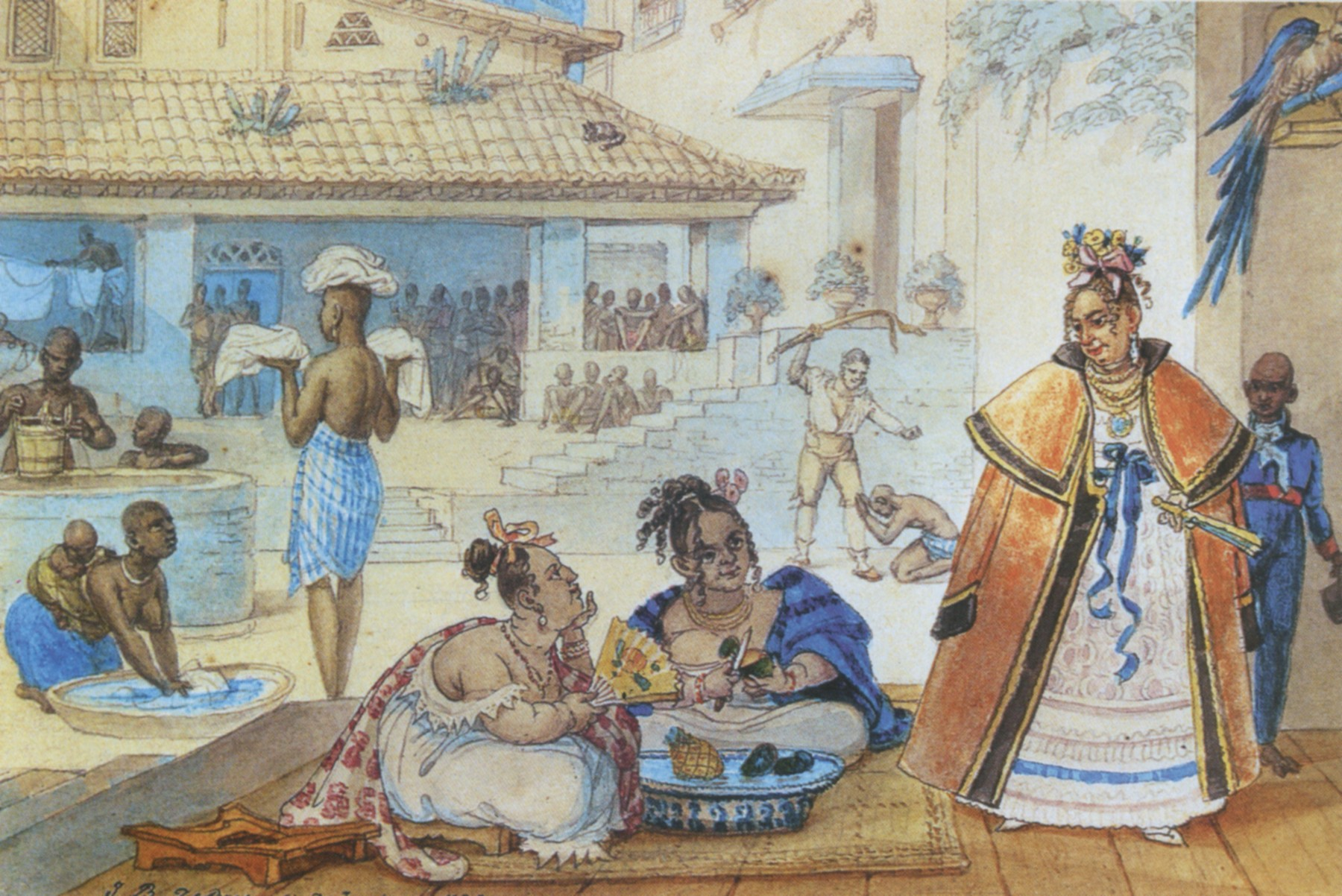
Interior of a Roma's house in Brazil c. 1820, by Debret

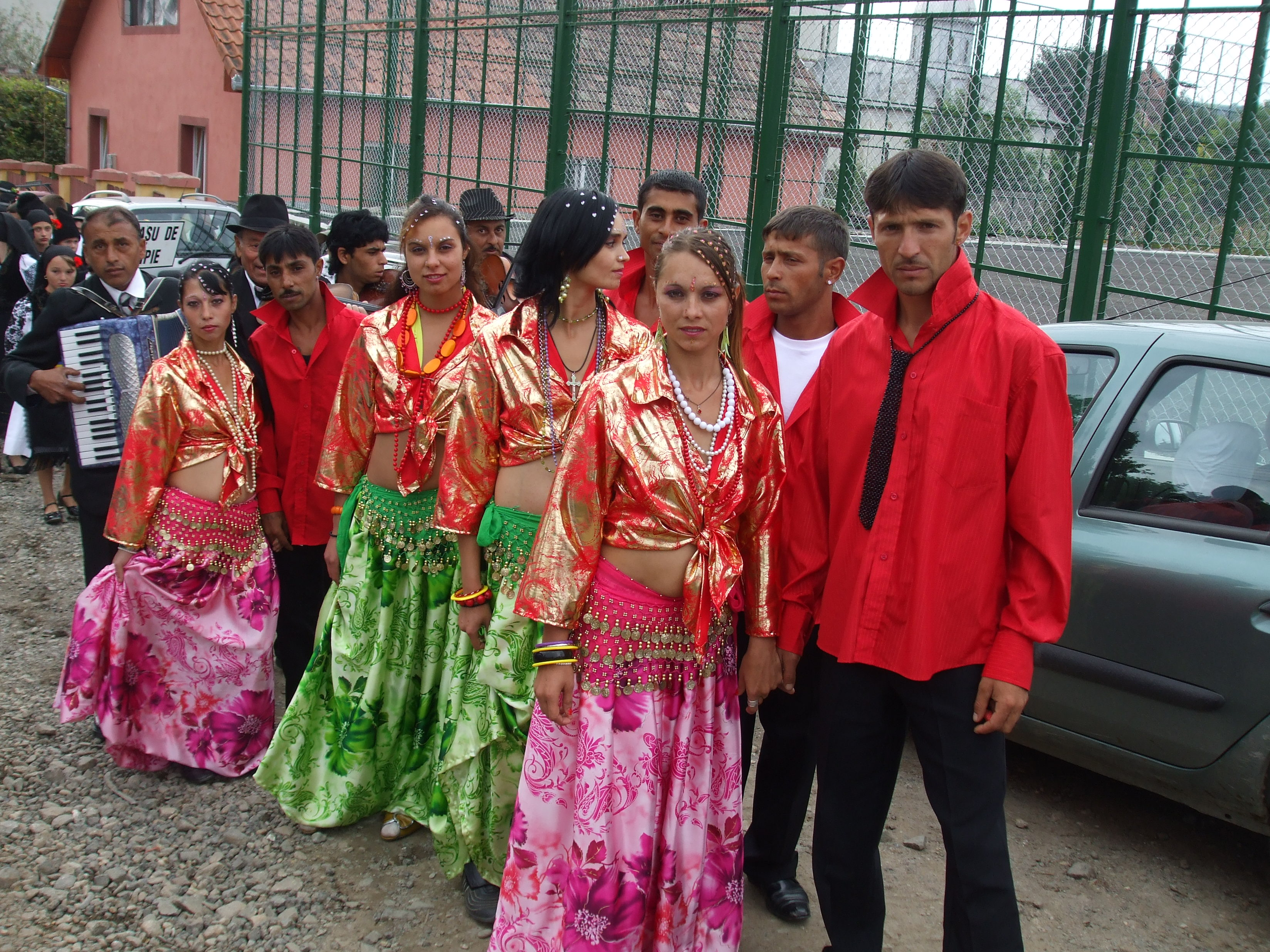
Romani dancers in Romania

Genetic evidence has shown that the Romani people originated from the Indian subcontinent and mixed with the local populations in Central Asia, the Middle East, and Europe. In the 1990s, it was discovered that Romani populations carried large frequencies of particular Y chromosomes (inherited paternally) that otherwise exist only in populations from South Asia, in addition to fairly significant frequencies of particular mitochondrial DNA (inherited maternally) that is rare outside South Asia.

47.3% of Romani males carry Y chromosomes of haplogroup H-M82 which is rare outside of the Indian subcontinent. A 2005 review reported that mitochondrial haplogroup M accounted for almost 30% of the Romani subjects studied, with nearly all of these sequences belonging to sub-haplogroup M5. A more detailed study of Polish Romani shows this to be of the M5 lineage, which is specific to India. Moreover, a form of the inherited disorder congenital myasthenia is found in Romani subjects. This form of the disorder, caused by the 1267delG mutation, is otherwise only known in subjects of Indian ancestry. This is considered to be the best evidence of the Indian ancestry of the Romanies.

The Romanis have been described as "a conglomerate of genetically isolated founder populations", while a number of common Mendelian disorders among Romanies from all over Europe indicates "a common origin and founder effect". See also this table:

A study from 2001 by Gresham et al. suggests "a limited number of related founders, compatible with a small group of migrants splitting from a distinct caste or tribal group". Also the study pointed out that "genetic drift and different levels and sources of admixture, appear to have played a role in the subsequent differentiation of populations". The same study found that "a single lineage ... found across Romani populations, accounts for almost one-third of Romani males. A similar preservation of a highly resolved male lineage has been reported elsewhere only for Jewish priests". See also the Cohen Modal Haplotype.

A 2004 study by Morar et al. concluded that the Romani are "a founder population of common origins that has subsequently split into multiple socially divergent and geographically dispersed Gypsy groups". The same study revealed that this population "was founded approximately 32–40 generations ago, with secondary and tertiary founder events occurring approximately 16–25 generations ago".

=== Admixture in South Africa ===
Coloured people as a proportion of the total population in South Africa.: 0–20%; 20–40%; 40–60%; 60–80%; 80–100%

Coloureds (Afrikaans: Kleurlinge or Bruinmense, lit. "Brown people") are a multiracial ethnic group native to Southern Africa who have ancestry from more than one of the various populations inhabiting the region, including Khoisan, Bantu, European, Austronesian, East Asian, or South Asian. Because of the combination of ethnicities, different families and individuals within a family may have a variety of different physical features. Coloured was a legally defined racial classification during apartheid. In the Western Cape, a distinctive Cape Coloured and affiliated Cape Malay culture developed. In other parts of Southern Africa, people classified as Coloured were usually the descendants of individuals from two distinct ethnicities. Genetic studies suggest the group has the highest levels of mixed ancestry in the world. Mitochondrial DNA studies have demonstrated that the maternal lines of the Coloured population are descended mostly from African Khoisan women. This ethnicity shows a gender-biased admixture. While a plurality of male lines have come from Ngunis, Southern African, West African, and East African populations, 45.2%, Western European lineages contributed 37.3% to paternal components and South Asian/Southeast Asian lineages 17.5%.

Coloureds are to be mostly found in the western part of South Africa. In Cape Town, they form 45.4% of the total population, according to the South African National Census of 2011.

== See also ==
- Exogamy
- Interethnic marriage
- Interracial marriage
- Interracial pornography
- Interfaith marriage
- Interdenominational marriage
- Multiculturalism
- Multiracialism
- Multiracial people
- Plaçage
- Race and genetics
- Race and society
- Race of the future
- Racial antisemitism
- Racial segregation
- Racism
- Racism by country
- Same-sex marriage
- Transnational marriage
