= Sexual Offences Act, 1957 =

South African legislation

Parliament of South Africa
- Long title: Act to consolidate and amend the laws relating to brothels and unlawful carnal intercourse and other acts in relation thereto.
- Citation: Act No. 23 of 1957
- Enacted by: Parliament of South Africa
- Royal assent: 3 April 1957
- Commenced: 12 April 1957

Repeals
- Criminal Law (Sexual Offences and Related Matters) Amendment Act, 2007

Amended by
- Immorality Amendment Act, 1967; Immorality Amendment Act, 1969; Immorality and Prohibition of Mixed Marriages Amendment Act, 1985; Immorality Amendment Act, 1988; Criminal Law (Sexual Offences and Related Matters) Amendment Act, 2007
- Status: Amended

The Sexual Offences Act, 1957 (Act No. 23 of 1957, originally the Immorality Act, 1957) is an act of the Parliament of South Africa which, in its current form, prohibits prostitution, brothel-keeping and procuring, and other activities related to prostitution. Before the law relating to sex offences was consolidated and revised by the Criminal Law (Sexual Offences and Related Matters) Amendment Act, 2007, it also prohibited various other sex offences, including sex with children under the age of consent and sex with the mentally incompetent. As the Immorality Act it was infamous for prohibiting sex between a white person and a person of another race, until that prohibition was removed by a 1985 amendment.

== Provisions in force ==
Brothel-keeping
Section 2 makes it a crime to keep a brothel, and section 3 defines various people who are deemed to be brothel-keepers, including anyone who lives in a brothel, manages or knowingly receives money from a brothel, knowingly permits a building to be used as a brothel, is found in a brothel and refuses to disclose the name of the keeper, and the spouse of any person who keeps a brothel. Section 4 places the onus on the prosecution to prove that the owner of a building used as a brothel knew that it was a brothel, unless the rent being paid to the owner was exorbitant, or the owner was notified by a police officer or by two householders from the vicinity. The penalty for brothel-keeping was originally imprisonment for up to three years with or without a fine of up to R600; in 1988 the fine was raised to R6 000. Until the 1985 amendment, the act also prescribed a more severe penalty of up to seven years imprisonment with or without a fine of up to R1 000 if interracial sex was involved.

Closing of brothels
Section 5 declares that any contract to let a building for use as a brothel is null and void, while section 6 voids any contract to let a building if that building subsequently becomes a brothel, but allows that an unknowing owner may still recover rent. Section 7 allows the owner of a building being used as a brothel to apply to the local magistrate for an eviction order. Section 8 allows a magistrate to issue a warrant for the search of an alleged brothel and the arrest of the alleged brothel-keeper. Such a warrant must be based on the sworn testimony of two householders in the vicinity, a police officer, or a welfare officer.

Procuring
Section 10 forbids procuring a woman to have sex with a third party, enticing a woman to a brothel for the purpose of sex, inducing a woman to become a prostitute, and using drugs or alcohol to overpower a woman to allow a third party to have sex with her. The penalty was originally imprisonment for up to five years, or until 1985, seven years if the sex in question was interracial. In 1988 the penalty was raised to up to seven years in all cases.

Detention
Section 12 makes it a crime to detain a woman against her will in a brothel, or for the purpose of sex. The penalty is imprisonment for up to five years.

Assistance
Section 12A, inserted in 1967, makes it a crime to assist a person to communicate with another person for the purpose of sex for reward. The aim is to criminalise the activities of escort agencies. The penalty is imprisonment for up to five years.

Use of premises
Section 17 makes it an offence for the owner or occupier of a house or place to knowingly allow it to be used in the commission of any other offence against the act. The penalty was originally up to six years imprisonment and a fine of up to R1 000; in 1988 the fine was increased to R12 000.

Soliciting
Section 19 makes it a crime to entice or solicit in a public place "for immoral purposes", or to exhibit oneself in public in "indecent dress". The 2007 act amended it so that the offence can only be committed by a person over the age of 18. The penalty was originally a fine of up to R400 or imprisonment for up to two years or both; in 1988 the fine was increased to R4 000.

Prostitution and living on the earnings of prostitution
Section 20 prohibits having sex for reward (i.e. prostitution) and living on the earnings of prostitution. The prohibition of prostitution itself was only introduced in 1988; before that time the actual act of prostitution was not a crime. The penalty was originally imprisonment for up to three years with or without a fine of up to R600; in 1988 the fine was raised to R6 000. Until the 1985 amendment, the act also prescribed a more severe penalty of up to seven years imprisonment with or without a fine of up to R1 000 if interracial sex was involved.
Section 20 also prohibits committing an "indecent act" in public, or assisting in or receiving reward for the commission of an indecent act between two people. The penalty was originally a fine of up to R400 or imprisonment for up to two years or both; in 1988 the fine was increased to R4 000.

== Repealed provisions ==
Procuring by parent
Section 9 forbade a parent or guardian from procuring their child for sex with a third party. Originally it applied only to female children, but was extended to male children in 1988. The penalty was up to five years imprisonment, unless the child was a boy under the age of fourteen or a girl under the age of twelve, in which case the penalty could extend to life imprisonment. This section was repealed by the 2007 act, which created a broader new offence of "sexual exploitation of a child".

Conspiracy
Section 11 made it a crime for two or more people to conspire to induce a woman to have sex by using false pretence or other fraudulent means. The penalty was imprisonment for up to five years. This section was repealed by the 2007 act, which instead includes a general conspiracy clause and the principle that fraud vitiates consent.

Abduction
Section 13 forbade taking an unmarried person under the age of 21 out of the custody of his or her parents or guardian with the intent that he or she should have sex with either the abductor or with another person. The penalty was up to seven years imprisonment. The section was repealed by the 2007 act.

Age of consent
In its original form, section 14 of the Sexual Offences Act made it a crime for a man to have sex with a girl or boy under the age of 16. In 1969 the age was raised to 19 for sex between two males (although such acts were also prosecutable as sodomy). In 1988 equivalent provisions were added to make it a crime for a woman to have sex with a male under 16 or a female under 19. The penalty was up to six years imprisonment and a fine of up to R1 000; in 1988 the fine was increased to R12 000.
Section 14 was repealed by the 2007 act, which fixed an equal age of consent of 16 for all sexual acts. This act was not retrospective; however, the inequality in the old act between the ages of consent for heterosexual and homosexual sex was struck down as unconstitutional in the 2008 case of Geldenhuys v National Director of Public Prosecutions.

Mentally disabled people
In its original form, section 15 prohibited sex with a female "idiot or imbecile", meaning a person with a mental disability. In 1988 it was amended to also apply to males. The penalty was the same as that prescribed for violations of section 14 (see above). The section was repealed by the 2007 act, which created a number of new offences relating to exploitation of people with mental disabilities.

Interracial sex
Section 16 contained the prohibition for which the name "Immorality Act" became infamous: it criminalised all extramarital sexual relations between a white person and a non-white person. (Interracial marriages were prohibited by the Prohibition of Mixed Marriages Act.) The penalty was imprisonment for up to seven years. The section (along with the Prohibition of Mixed Marriages Act) was repealed in 1985.

Use of drugs
Section 18 made it an offence to use drugs or alcohol to overpower a woman for the purpose of having sex; the penalty was up to five years imprisonment. The section was repealed by the 2007 act, which instead provided that a person whose judgement or consciousness is adversely affected by drugs or alcohol cannot consent to sex.

Sex toys
Section 18A, inserted in 1969, prohibited the manufacture and sale of "any article which is intended to be used to perform an unnatural sexual act", i.e. some types of sex toy. The section was repealed by the 2007 act.

"Men at a party"

Section 20A, inserted in 1969, created the infamous "men at a party" offence. This made it a crime for any two men to commit, at "a party" an act which stimulated sexual passion or gave sexual gratification. The definition of "party" was, however, any occasion where more than two people were present. Although most sex between men was already illegal as sodomy or "commission of an unnatural sexual offence", this provision was added in response to public scandal over gay parties raided by the police in Johannesburg. The penalty was up to two years imprisonment or a fine of up to R400, or both; the fine was increased to R4 000 in 1988.
In 1998 it was invalidated (retroactively to 27 April 1994) as unconstitutionally discriminatory, in the case of National Coalition for Gay and Lesbian Equality v Minister of Justice, which also struck down the offences of sodomy and commission of an unnatural sexual offence. The section was formally removed by the 2007 act.

== Amendments ==
- The Immorality Amendment Act, 1967 (Act No. 68 of 1967) added section 12A (see above) aimed at prohibiting escort services and the like, and redefined all fines in terms of rands rather than South African pounds.
- The Immorality Amendment Act, 1969 (Act No. 57 of 1969) introduced or expanded a number of offences (see above). It added section 18A (prohibiting sex toys) and 20A ("men at a party"). It also amended section 14 to raise the age of consent for male-male sex to 19.
- The Immorality and Prohibition of Mixed Marriages Amendment Act, 1985 (Act No. 72 of 1985) repealed section 16, which prohibited interracial sex, and other provisions which penalised interracial sex more heavily. This came as part of the repeal of many petty apartheid laws under the government of P. W. Botha.
- The Immorality Amendment Act, 1988 (Act No. 2 of 1988) renamed the act from "Immorality Act, 1957" to "Sexual Offences Act, 1957". It amended sections 9, 12A and 15 to be gender-neutral where they had previously referred only to females, and amended section 14 to criminalise, for the first time, a woman having sex with a person under the age of consent, for that purpose setting the age of consent at 16 for a boy and 19 for a girl. It also made it a crime to be a prostitute, where previously only certain acts related to prostitution had been illegal.
- The Criminal Law Amendment Act, 1992 (Act No. 4 of 1992) made certain technical modifications to the penalty clauses.
- The General Law Amendment Act, 1992 (Act No. 139 of 1992) removed a provision allowing the act to be applied in the territory of South West Africa, as a result of that territory's independence as Namibia.
- The General Law Fourth Amendment Act, 1993 (Act No. 132 of 1993) placed certain assumptions about brothel-keeping on a gender-neutral basis.
- The Criminal Law (Sexual Offences and Related Matters) Amendment Act, 2007 (Act No. 32 of 2007) repealed and replaced many provisions, leaving only those related to prostitution and brothel-keeping. It also amended several of the remaining sections so that people under 18 cannot be convicted of the offences they prohibit.

== See also ==
- Immorality Act
