= Born a Crime =

2016 book by Trevor Noah

Born a Crime: Stories from a South African Childhood
- Author: Trevor Noah
- Language: English
- Genre: Memoir
- Publisher: Spiegel & Grau
- Publication date: November 15, 2016
- Media type: Print (Hardback)
- Pages: 304
- ISBN: 978-0-399-58817-4

Born a Crime: Stories from a South African Childhood is an autobiographical comedy book written by South African comedian Trevor Noah, published in 2016. The book focuses on Noah's childhood growing up in his native South Africa after he was born of an illegal interracial relationship during the apartheid era. The book was a bestseller and has received overwhelmingly positive reviews.

== Narrative ==
The book details Trevor Noah's experiences growing up in South Africa during the apartheid era. Noah's parents were a white Swiss-German father and a black Xhosa mother. At the time of Noah's birth in 1984, their interracial relationship was illegal under the Immorality Act, 1957. According to Noah, "for [him] to be born as a mixed-race baby" was to be "born a crime". Interracial relations were decriminalised when the Immorality Act was amended in 1985. As a mixed-race person, Noah was classified as a "Coloured" in accordance to the apartheid system of racial classification. Noah was raised primarily by his mother and maternal grandmother in Soweto.

In large part, the book is a paean to Noah's mother, Patricia, who grew up in a hut with fourteen occupants. Noah describes his mother as being stubborn, fearless, and an extraordinary teacher. She was a fiercely religious woman who took her son to three churches every Sunday, a prayer meeting on Tuesday, Bible study on Wednesday and youth church on Thursday, even when black South Africans were rioting in the streets and most people were cowering in their homes.

The book opens with young Noah being thrown out of a minibus by his mother because she thought the driver, a man from another South African tribe, was going to kill them. Noah develops social and mental agility, using his fluency in languages to break barriers to his acceptance as a mixed race child. Growing up in poverty, he finds independence by earning money from selling illegal bootleg CDs, first at school and later on the streets of the notorious neighborhood of Alexandra. Noah describes the struggle of living with his abusive stepfather Abel. Through it all, his mother administers tough love and "old-school, Old Testament discipline". When Noah is arrested while driving an unregistered car taken from Abel's workshop without permission, he describes his fear of doing time in prison, and his mother lays down the law about crime and punishment. The book ends with the story of Patricia being shot in the head by Abel while she was returning from church with her family, and her miraculous survival.

== Reception ==
Published in November 2016, Born a Crime was received favorably by major U.S. book reviewers. It became a No. 1 New York Times Bestseller and was named one of the best books of the year by The New York Times, Newsday, Esquire, NPR, and Booklist. In early 2017, its title was used as a clue in the New York Times Crossword Puzzle, and has been used two more times, in 2019 and 2020.

U.S. senator Tammy Duckworth cited Born a Crime as the book that inspired her to write her 2021 memoir Every Day Is a Gift, in which she relates her experiences as the child of a white American father and a Thai mother. Former first Lady Jill Biden, an English professor at Northern Virginia Community College, assigned Born a Crime as required reading for an introductory English course.

=== Film adaptation ===
In 2018, it was announced that the memoir would be adapted into a film starring Lupita Nyong'o as Patricia, Noah's mother. Nyong'o was set to produce the film with Noah through his production company, Ark Angel Productions. In March 2018, Liesl Tommy was hired to direct the film, which would be produced by Paramount Players.
