= Into the Uncut Grass =

2024 children book by Trevor Noah

- First edition cover
- Author: Trevor Noah
- Illustrator: Sabina Hahn
- Publisher: One World/Random House
- Publication date: October 8, 2024
- Pages: 128
- ISBN: 978-0-593-72996-0

Into The Uncut Grass is a 2024 children's book by South African comedian Trevor Noah and illustrated by Sabina Hahn.

== Background ==
Trevor Noah noted that he always wanted to write a children's book and the book was his own way of tackling "the most complicated subject, which is conflict resolution, using one of the more, I would say like the nine subjects in our lives, which is just like kids who don’t want to do something that their parents want them to do."

Although The Guardian referred to Into the Uncut Grass as "a spiritual successor" to Noah's 2016 book Born a Crime, the book is not directly based on Noah's life experiences.

== Publication history ==
Into the Uncut Grass was illustrated by Sabina Hahn and was published by Oneworld Publications.

== Reception ==
Into the Uncut Grass received a four star rating from Common Sense Media's Joly Herman. Kirkus Reviews called it "a sweet bedtime story".

Libby D'Orvilliers, writing for The Rider, referred to the book's illustrations as "simplistic and cute, offering imaginative stills that capture the essence of a child’s curiosity".
