= Kimberly Jones =

American author (born 1976)

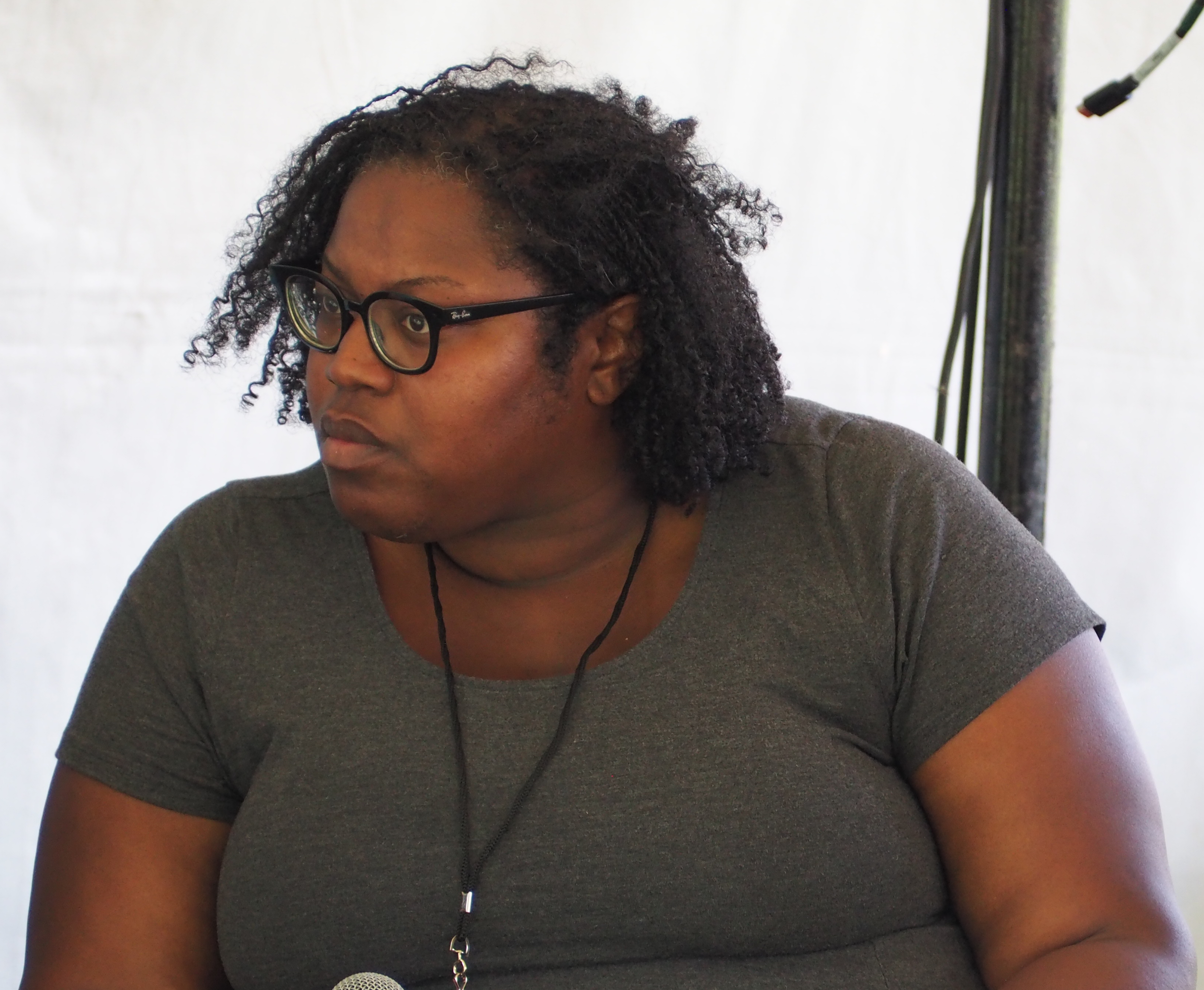
- Born: March 18, 1976 (age 50)
- Occupations: Author, filmmaker, activist
- Writing career
- Notable work: I'm Not Dying with You Tonight
- Website: kimjoneswrites.com

Kimberly Latrice Jones (born 18 March 1976) is an American author, filmmaker, and activist known for co-authoring the book I'm Not Dying with You Tonight and for the viral video How Can We Win published during the George Floyd protests.

Jones attended the Chicago Academy for the Arts to study theater, then went to Columbia College Chicago to major in film with a concentration in producing. Her career in the film and television industry began when she started working on the reality TV show Being Bobby Brown. Her other career opportunities consist of collaborating with Tyler Perry on movies like Madea's Family Reunion and I Can Do Bad All By Myself.

Aside from authoring several novels, Jones has appeared as a guest on various shows and podcasts such as CBS Mornings, The Daily Show, TMZ, and The Breakfast Club. In 2025, she became a co-host of the Country Rap Tunes podcast. Currently, she works at LCS Literary as an associate agent, where she represents children's picture books and adult non-fiction novels. She is writing her first adult fiction novel and has started KLJ Management, her own management company, and represents actor and artist T-Dawg Da Don.

== I'm Not Dying with You Tonight ==
Jones co-authored the young adult book I'm Not Dying with You Tonight, published in August 2019 with Gilly Segal, whom she had met through a young adult writing community. The pair began writing the book following the 2015 Baltimore protests as they became interested in exploring teenagers' perspectives on such events. Through the novel's central focus on racial issues, Segal and Jones have said that they aim for readers to establish dialogue to self-reflect and determine if they have demonstrated the implicit bias shown in the pages.

The book, set in a fictional neighborhood of Atlanta, follows two teenage girls, one black and one white, whose perspectives are challenged during a night of racial tension and riots in their city. The book alternates between their perspectives, with one written by Jones and the other by Segal. Jones says that "rotating between two first-person points of view enabled us to dig deeply into each girl's character." The characters' juxtaposing racial backgrounds and cultural differences determine how they react to the riots of that night.

The research Segal and Jones conducted to write their novel consisted of interviewing riot participants from Los Angeles, Philadelphia, and Ferguson to understand the emotional intensity of rioting through personal experiences, and spending time with SWAT and police officers to comprehend the measures law enforcement takes during what they call "mass disturbances".

Paste magazine listed I'm Not Dying with You Tonight as one of the best young adult novels of August 2019, describing the story as "explosive" and "not to be missed." In their review, Publishers Weekly called the book "timely" and "accessible," but felt the characters and their arcs weren't fully realized. Kirkus Reviews gave the book a negative review, citing unresolved and messy story arcs. The book was a finalist for an NAACP Image Award in 2020.

Film rights for the book were secured by Autumn Bailey-Ford in June 2020.

== How Can We Win ==
In 2020, Jones was in Atlanta interviewing protesters taking part in the George Floyd protests. While doing so, she recorded a video talking to the camera about racism in the United States, which subsequently went viral online. In the 7-minute video, she contests the dialogue around the protests, arguing that commentators should be discussing why people were rioting, not what they were doing.

Jones uses a Monopoly analogy to explain the history of racism and its economic impact on Black Americans. She emphasizes that the reason for the large economic disparity between Black and White Americans today is because enslaved Black people were deprived of their rights to own property, and when they could finally work and acquire property, the oppressors "burned them to the ground" and took everything from them. Black people cannot "pull themselves up by their bootstraps" and achieve economic prosperity because America's economy was built on slavery, and the result today is Black poverty. According to Jones, the Monopoly game is fixed, designed to economically disadvantage Black Americans.

The social contract, a theory most notably discussed by Thomas Hobbes, John Locke, and Jean-Jacques Rousseau, is also a central theme of Jones's video. All individuals enter a social contract, in which we give up our natural rights to receive protection, security, and other benefits from the government. Jones believes the social contract between Black Americans and authority is broken because, despite law enforcement being created to protect and serve, officers commit police brutality and kill members of the Black community in the streets. She also says that the social contract is broken when the oppressors destroy the wealth Black Americans built by themselves and claim it as their own, which is a model for how America's economy has functioned and continues to function today.

The video was shared online by celebrities including Trevor Noah, Madonna, and LeBron James, and shown at the end of an episode of Last Week Tonight with John Oliver in the week after its publication. It has been viewed more than 2 million times on YouTube.

Following the video's release, Henry Holt and Company signed a deal with Jones to publish two books, one of which will expand on the topics outlined in the video. She subsequently signed a deal with Warner Bros. Television.

== Other works ==
Inspired by her viral video, Jones published a non-fiction novel in 2021 titled How We Can Win: Race, History, and Changing the Money Game That's Rigged. In her book, she expands upon the statements she made in the video, using personal experiences and observations to highlight the economic and social disparities that Black Americans have been facing for generations. She offers ways to fight against this system, such as calling for a "Reconstruction 2.0," which would give Black people the chance for economic reform. By dismantling old, oppressive institutions, reinstating the Freedman's Bureau, and establishing a truth and reconciliation committee for equity, Jones believes all people can achieve economic success.

Jones and Gilly Segal published another young adult novel together in 2021 called Why We Fly, a story about two teenage girls, one black and one white, who are cheerleaders and lifelong friends. Relationships, college application stress, and privilege cause a rift between them, while they must grapple with becoming a viral sensation due to an act of protest at their high school football game. Inspired by Colin Kaepernick's infamous act of taking a knee during the national anthem, the students aimed to shed light on the hateful and unequal treatment of African Americans by doing the same. Jones and Segal hoped to inspire young people to create spaces where others' voices can be heard, especially if their identities are under attack.

Published in 2022, Jones and Segal collaborated on another novel as co-authors called Game On: 15 Stories of Wins, Losses, and Everything in Between, a YA anthology about games that spans across different genres and styles.
