= Trevor Noah =

South African comedian (born 1984)

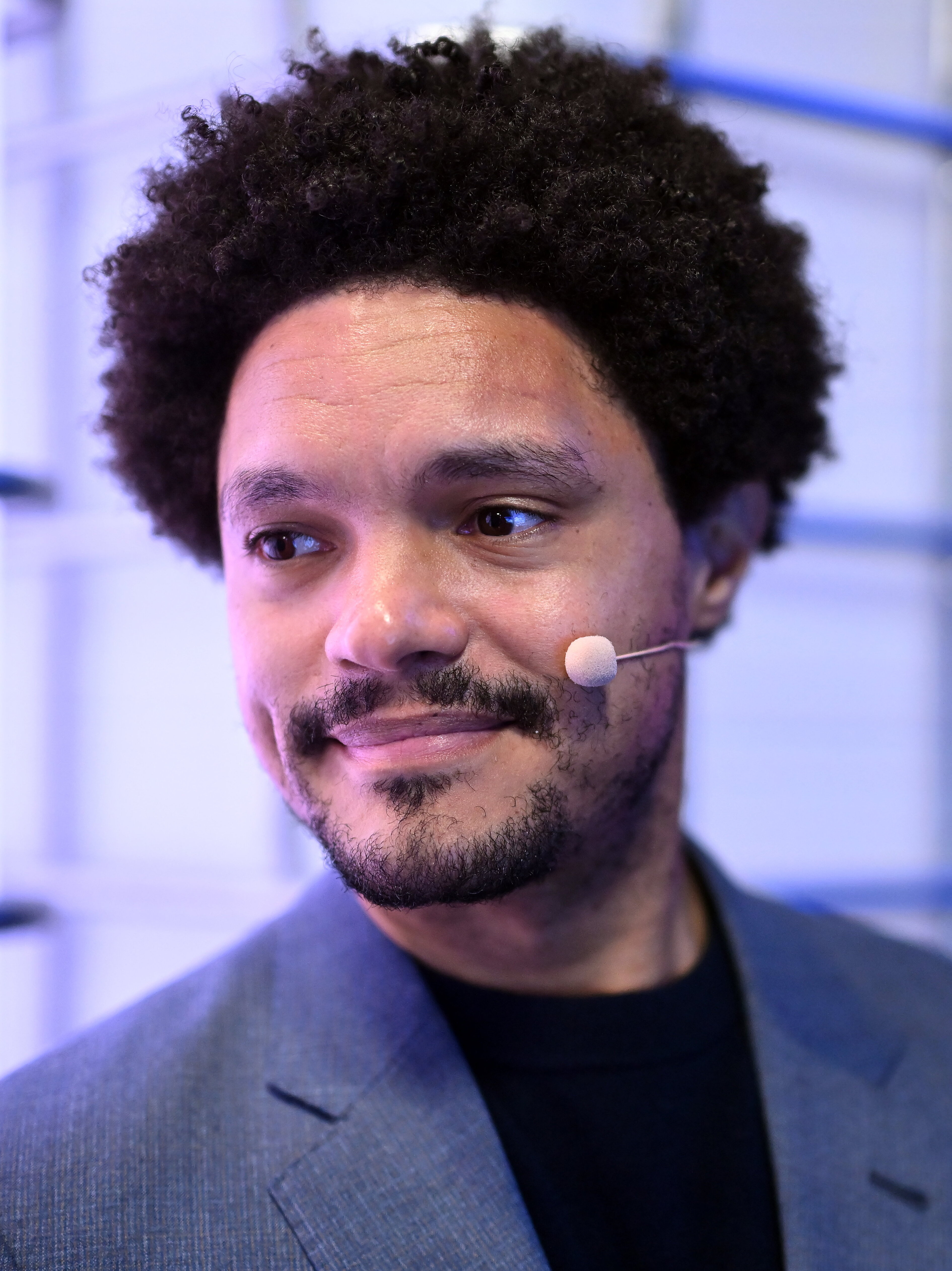
- Noah in 2024
- Born: 20 February 1984 (age 42); Johannesburg, Transvaal, (Note: Now Gauteng) South Africa

Comedy career
- Years active: 2002–present
- Medium: Stand-up; television; film; books; podcast
- Genres: Political/news satire; observational comedy; surreal humour; racial humor; insult comedy; deadpan
- Subjects: Mass media/news media/media criticism; American politics; South African culture; current events; race relations; pop culture

- Website: trevornoah.com

Trevor Noah (born 20 February 1984) is a South African comedian, writer, producer, political commentator, and television host. He was the host of The Daily Show, an American late-night talk show and satirical news program on Comedy Central, from 2015 to 2022. Noah has won various awards, including two Primetime Emmy Awards. He was named one of "The 35 Most Powerful People in New York Media" by The Hollywood Reporter in 2017 and 2018. In 2018, Time magazine named him one of the 100 most influential people in the world.

Born in Johannesburg, Noah began his career in South Africa in 2008. He had several hosting roles with the South African Broadcasting Corporation (SABC) and was the runner-up in the fourth season of South Africa's iteration of Strictly Come Dancing in 2008. From 2010 to 2011, he hosted the late-night talk show Tonight with Trevor Noah, which he created and aired on M-Net and DStv.

In 2014, Noah became the Senior International Correspondent for The Daily Show, and in 2015 succeeded long-time host Jon Stewart. His autobiographical comedy book Born a Crime was published in 2016. He has hosted the Grammy Awards for six consecutive years, from 2021 to 2026, as well as the 2022 White House Correspondents Dinner.

== Early life ==
Trevor Noah was born on 20 February 1984 in Johannesburg, Transvaal province, (now Gauteng), South Africa. His father, Robert, is Swiss-German, and his mother, Patricia Nombuyiselo Noah, is Xhosa.

Under apartheid legislation, Noah's mother was classified as Black, and his father was classified as White. Noah himself was classified as Coloured. At the time of his birth, his parents' interracial relationship was illegal, which Noah highlights in his autobiography Born a Crime. Interracial sexual relations and marriages were decriminalized a year after his birth, when the Immorality Act was amended in 1985. Patricia and her mother, Nomalizo Frances Noah, raised Trevor in the black township of Soweto. Noah began his schooling at Maryvale College, a private Roman Catholic primary and high school in Maryvale, Gauteng, a suburb of Johannesburg.

He grew up in South Africa in a multicultural environment, reflecting both his White and Black heritage. Raised in a devoutly Christian household, he was also exposed to aspects of Jewish traditions, including having a bar mitzvah celebration on his 13th birthday.

== Career ==
=== 2002–2013: Early work and breakthrough ===
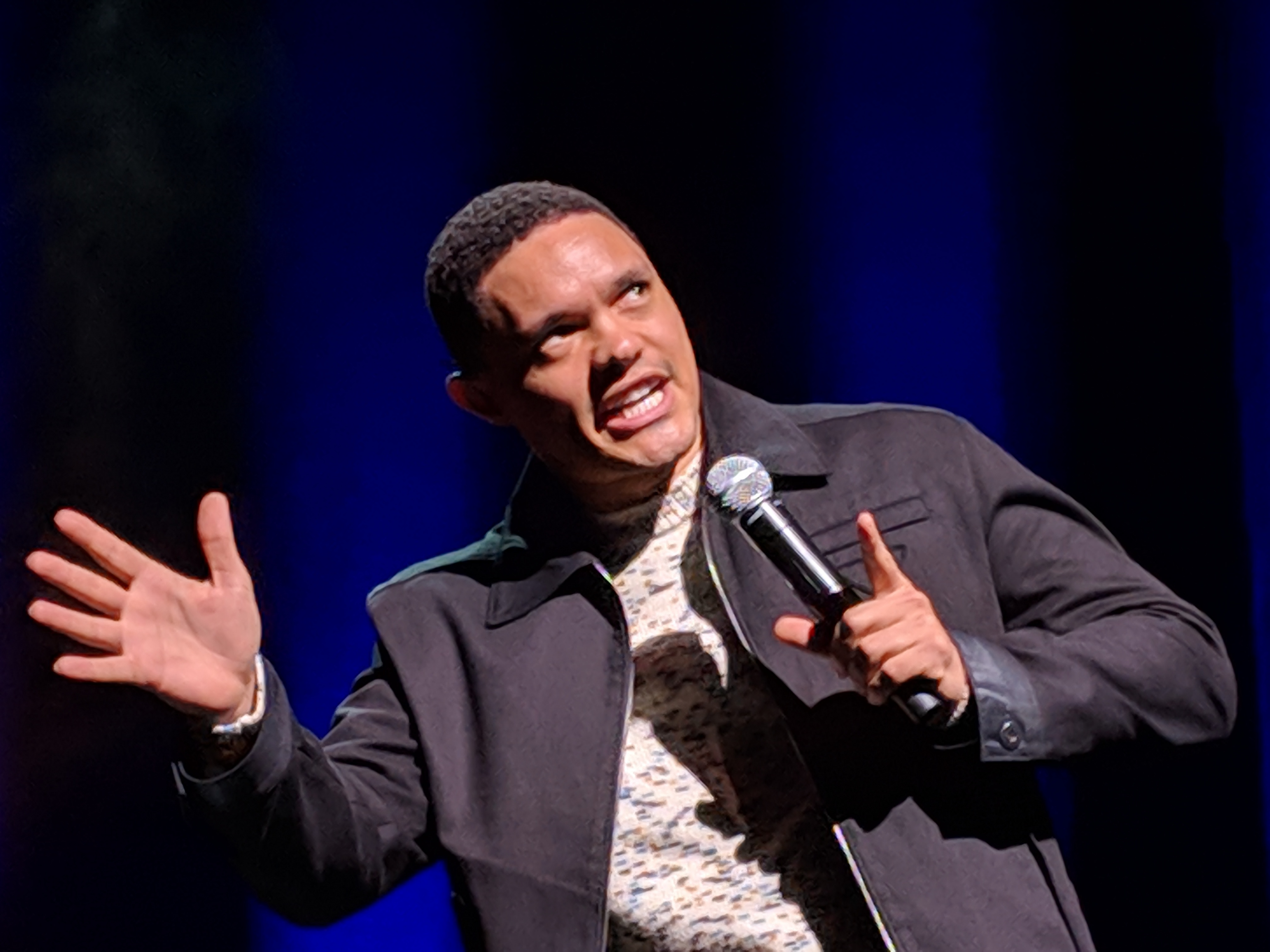
Noah performing on his Loud and Clear tour in February 2019

In 2002, Noah had a small role on an episode of the South African soap opera Isidingo. He later hosted his own radio show Noah's Ark on Gauteng's leading youth-radio station, YFM. When he was 21 years old, his friends dared him to perform a comedy routine at a nightclub. He entertained the audience with humorous stories about his friends and his life. After that night Noah continued performing at comedy clubs, gaining recognition along the way. He dropped his radio show and acting to focus on comedy, and has performed with South African comedians such as Kagiso Lediga, Riaad Moosa, Darren Simpson, Marc Lottering, Barry Hilton, and Nik Rabinowitz; international comedians such as Paul Rodriguez, Carl Barron, Dan Ilic, and Paul Zerdin; and as the opening act for American comedian Gabriel Iglesias in November 2007 and Canadian comedian Russell Peters on his South African tour.

Noah hosted an educational TV programme, Run the Adventure (2004–2006) on SABC 2. In 2007, he hosted The Real Goboza, a gossip-themed show on SABC 1, and Siyadlala, a sports show also on the SABC. In 2008, Noah cohosted, alongside Pabi Moloi, The Amazing Date (a dating gameshow) and was a Strictly Come Dancing contestant in the fourth series. In 2009, he hosted the 3rd Annual South Africa Film and Television Awards (SAFTAs) and co-hosted alongside Eugene Khoza on The Axe Sweet Life, a reality competition series. In 2010, Noah hosted the 16th annual South African Music Awards and also hosted Tonight with Trevor Noah on MNet (for the second series, it moved to DStv's Mzansi Magic Channel). In 2010, Noah also became a spokesperson and consumer protection agent for Cell C, South Africa's third-largest mobile phone network provider.

Noah performed in The Blacks Only Comedy Show, the Heavyweight Comedy Jam, the Vodacom Campus Comedy Tour, the Cape Town International Comedy Festival, the Jozi Comedy Festival, and Bafunny Bafunny (2010). His stand-up comedy specials in South Africa include The Daywalker (2009), Crazy Normal (2011), That's Racist (2012), and It's My Culture (2013).

In 2011, he moved to the United States. In January 2012, Noah became the first South African stand-up comedian to appear on The Tonight Show; and in May 2013, he became the first to appear on Late Show with David Letterman. Noah was the subject of the 2012 documentary You Laugh But It's True. The same year, he starred in the one-man comedy show Trevor Noah: The Racist, which was based on his similarly titled South African special That's Racist. In August 2012, he performed Trevor Noah: The Racist to sold-out crowds at the Edinburgh Festival Fringe. In September 2012, Noah was the Roastmaster in a Comedy Central Roast of South African Afrikaans singer Steve Hofmeyr. In October 2012, he was the first comedian to premiere on the second season of Gabriel Iglesias Presents Stand Up Revolution. In 2013, he performed the comedy special Trevor Noah: African American. In October 2013, he was a guest on BBC Two's comedy panel show QI. In November 2013, he was a panellist on Channel 4 game show 8 Out of 10 Cats and appeared on Sean Lock's team in 8 Out of 10 Cats Does Countdown in September 2014.

=== 2014–2022: The Daily Show correspondent and host ===
In December 2014, Noah became a recurring contributor on The Daily Show. In March 2015, Comedy Central announced that Noah would succeed Jon Stewart as host of The Daily Show; his tenure began on 28 September 2015.

Following his announcement as Stewart's successor, attention was drawn on the Internet to jokes he had posted on his Twitter account, some of which were criticised as being misogynistic, and others as antisemitic or mocking the Holocaust. Noah responded by tweeting, "To reduce my views to a handful of jokes that didn't land is not a true reflection of my character, nor my evolution as a comedian." Comedy Central stood behind Noah, saying in a statement, "Like many comedians, Trevor Noah pushes boundaries; he is provocative and spares no one, himself included ... To judge him or his comedy based on a handful of jokes is unfair. Trevor is a talented comedian with a bright future at Comedy Central." Mary Kluk, chairperson of the South African Jewish Board of Deputies (SAJBD), said that the jokes were not signs of anti-Jewish prejudice and that they were part of Noah's style of comedy. Noah has faced further criticism after video clips of him joking about Aboriginal women and the Marikana massacre in old standup routines resurfaced.

After Noah took over from Stewart, viewership dropped 37%, and its Nielsen ratings fell below those of several other shows hosted by Daily Show alumni; however, according to Comedy Central's president, the Daily Show under Noah was the number-one show for millennials. James Poniewozik of The New York Times praised him and the show's writers, saying, "Mr. Noah's debut was largely successful, it was also because of the operating system—the show's writing—running under the surface". Robert Lloyd of the Los Angeles Times described him as "charming and composed—almost inevitably low-key compared with the habitually antic and astonished Stewart." Other critics gave him less favourable reviews, with Salon writing, "Jon Stewart created a national treasure. Noah has dulled its knife, weakened the satire, let the powerful run free." Noah's platform on the show has led to three stand-up specials on Comedy Central and Netflix. By 2017, nightly viewership was less than half of what it had been during the end of Stewart's tenure; viewership among millennials remained solid, however, and Comedy Central extended Noah's contract as host of The Daily Show through 2022. He would also produce and host annual end-of-year specials for Comedy Central.

After France won the 2018 FIFA World Cup, Noah commented, "I get it, they have to say it's the French team. But look at those guys. You don't get that tan by hanging out in the south of France, my friends. Basically if you don't understand, France is Africans' backup team." The French Ambassador to the United States, Gérard Araud, issued a letter condemning Noah's joke. He wrote, "Unlike the United States of America, France does not refer to its citizens based on their race, religion or origin. For us, there is no hyphenated identity, the roots are an individual reality. By calling them an African team, it seems that you are denying their Frenchness." Noah responded to the controversy, saying he did not intend to deny that the team was French, and instead to celebrate their African heritage.

In April 2017, Noah began developing a talk show for Jordan Klepper: The Opposition with Jordan Klepper, which premiered in September, and ran for one season. Noah also executive-produced Klepper, a primetime weekly docuseries, beginning in May 2019. In March 2018, Noah signed a multiyear contract with Viacom giving them first-look rights to any future projects by him. In addition to the deal, Noah would also be launching an international production and distribution company called Day Zero Productions.

His memoir Born a Crime was published in November 2016 and was received favourably by major U.S. book reviewers. Other than the author, his mother has a central role in the book, while his father is mentioned only occasionally. It became a No. 1 New York Times Bestseller and was named one of the best books of the year by The New York Times, Newsday, Esquire, NPR, and Booklist. It was announced that a film adaptation based on the book would star Lupita Nyong'o as his mother. In July 2018, Noah and The Daily Show writing staff released The Donald J. Trump Presidential Twitter Library, a book comprising hundreds of Trump tweets and featuring a foreword by Pulitzer Prize-winning historian Jon Meacham. In 2017, he made an appearance on the TV series Nashville. In 2018, he appeared in Black Panther and American Vandal.

Noah's May 2020 video "George Floyd, Minneapolis Protests, Ahmaud Arbery & Amy Cooper" has close to 10 million views on the Daily Show channel on YouTube. Noah stated that "The social contract is a contract that we sign as human beings with a society" and it grants citizens protection from each other and the government. Noah connects the idea of a broken contract to the deaths of George Floyd and Ahmaud Arbery, the disproportionate impact the coronavirus had on Black communities, and the viral video of Amy Cooper in Central Park. Noah states that "if you uphold your end of the contract and the other person doesn't, then the contract is broken." Noah's video on the "broken" social contract is now one of The Daily Show's most popular videos.

Shortly after Noah's video on the social contract, writer and activist Kimberly Jones also made a video on the "broken" contract. Her video has 2.5 millions of views on YouTube. Jones appeared on the Daily Show (19 June 2020) Jones and Noah discussed subjects like "broken" social contract and Jones's book I'm Not Dying with You Tonight.

In May 2021, he spoke about the Israeli–Palestinian conflict, saying "If you were in a fight where the other person cannot beat you, how hard should you retaliate when they try to hurt you?" His words were criticized by American Jewish Committee CEO David Harris. In March 2022, Noah criticized the greater emphasis on events in Ukraine than on those in other regions such as Africa and the Middle East, claiming racial bias and a racial "double standard" when it comes to news reporting. He pointed to the willingness of Eastern European countries like Poland to accept Ukrainian refugees and noted how "interesting" it was that the countries of Central and Eastern Europe have been "so willing and able to accept a million people coming into their countries in just a few days when just recently they didn't seem to have any space for a different group of refugees." In September 2022, he mocked the sham referendums held in the Russian-occupied parts of Ukraine.

In October 2022, after Rishi Sunak became Prime Minister of the United Kingdom, Noah claimed that there was a racist backlash in the UK against someone of Indian heritage taking that role. British Conservative politician Sajid Javid described Noah's remarks as "A narrative catered to his audience, at a cost of being completely detached from reality." There were suggestions that Noah was projecting the U.S. political context onto the UK; English author Tom Holland stated, "As ever, the inability of American liberals to understand the world beyond the US in anything but American terms is a thing of wonder." Sunak's spokesperson insisted, in response to Noah's claims, that the UK is not a racist country; Noah stated that he never made a statement about the country as a whole, only about "some people."

On 29 September 2022, Noah requested some extra minutes during that night's program and announced that he would be leaving The Daily Show at an undetermined future date after hosting the show for seven years. After revisiting stand-up comedy, he felt a longing to return to visiting countries for shows, learning new languages and "being everywhere, doing everything." It was confirmed the following month that Noah's last show would be on 8 December 2022.

=== 2022–present: Post–The Daily Show ===
Noah hosted the Grammy Awards six times, in 2021, 2022, 2023, 2024, 2025, and 2026. He also served as host of the White House Correspondents' Dinner in 2022.

In June 2023, it was announced that Trevor Noah would launch a weekly Spotify original podcast going over various topics. The podcast was released in November that year and is called What Now? with Trevor Noah. In each episode Noah has a special guest with him. It is his second podcast after one that he hosted for Luminary in 2019 and 2020. In 2024, he collaborated with Epic Games (developer of Fortnite) to feature JokeNite, an island that features stand-up performances such as Matthew Broussard, Preacher Lawson, Scott Seiss, and Marcia Belsky. In 2024, he acted in the Jennifer Lopez romantic drama This Is Me... Now: A Love Story.

== Influences ==
In 2013, Noah said of his comedic influences,

The kings are indisputable. Richard Pryor, [Bill] Cosby; for me personally I didn't know of him before I started comedy but Eddie Murphy changed my view on the thing and I definitely look up to him as a comedic influence. Chris Rock in terms of the modern black comedian and Dave Chappelle. Those are the guys that have laid the foundation and have moved the yardstick for all comedians, not just Black comedians.

He also cited Jon Stewart as an influence and a mentor, following his appointment to succeed Stewart as host of The Daily Show. In an interview with The New York Times, Noah likened Stewart to "a Jewish Yoda" and recounted advice Stewart gave him, saying:

The most amazing thing that Jon did was he didn't give me a mandate. He didn't say, 'You need to make my show.' He specifically said: 'Make your show. Make your best version of it.' I apply those teachings of Jon's to everything that I'm doing.

Among comedians who say they were influenced by Noah are Michelle Wolf, Jordan Klepper, and Hasan Minhaj. Noah's mixed-race ancestry, his experiences growing up in Soweto, and his observations about race and ethnicity are leading themes in his comedy.

== Personal life ==
Noah speaks English, German, Southern Sotho, Zulu, Xhosa, Tswana, Tsonga and Afrikaans. Noah has ADHD. He resides in New York City.

In his book, Born a Crime, Noah talks about the challenges within South African apartheid with a white father and as a mixed race child. Noah's father, Robert, wanted a relationship with his son but the relationship was kept private. Noah recounts a story of him running towards Robert yelling "Daddy, daddy." Robert began to run away, drawing public attention. Noah at the time thought that he wanted to play a game of tag. After that day Robert and Noah only met in Robert's apartment.

In 1992, Noah's mother, Patricia Nombuyiselo, married Ngisaveni Abel Shingange and they had two sons together. Shingange physically abused both Trevor and his mother, and the couple legally divorced in 1996. Robert moved to a different city when Noah was 13, and Shingange did not allow them to maintain a close relationship. At the age of 24, Noah decided to look for his father and they happily reunited.

In 2009, after Patricia married Sfiso Khoza, Shingange shot her in the leg and through the back of her head. She survived because the bullet went through the base of her head, avoiding the spinal cord, brain, and all major nerves and blood vessels, and exited with minor damage to her nostril.

In 2011, Shingange was convicted of attempted murder and sentenced the following year to three years of correctional supervision. Noah stated that he hoped the attention surrounding the incident would raise awareness of the broader issue of domestic violence in South Africa: "For years my mother reached out to police for help with domestic abuse, and nothing was ever done. This is the norm in South Africa. Dockets went missing and cases never went to court."

Noah has described himself as being progressive and having a global perspective. However, he has clarified that he considers himself a "progressive person", but not a "political progressive", and prefers not to be categorised as being either right or left in the context of US partisanship.

In April 2018, Noah launched The Trevor Noah Foundation, a youth development initiative that works to provide access to high-quality education. Trevor created the foundation to support South African communities believing that education is seed in which everything grows. Over 50,000 youths in South Africa have been impacted by the TNF. The Trevor Noah Foundation mission statement declaring "Our mission is to mobilise the global community to empower youth with the foundation for a Better Life: access to high-quality education."

Noah was selected as the Class Day speaker for Princeton University's Class of 2021. He gave his address virtually on 15 May 2021, and was inducted as an honorary member of the Class of 2021.

Noah is a supporter of Liverpool FC.

== Filmography ==
=== Film ===
| Year | Title | Role | Notes |
|---|---|---|---|
| 2011 | You Laugh But It's True | Himself | Documentary |
| 2011 | Taka Takata | Pilo | |
| 2012 | Mad Buddies | Bookie | |
| 2018 | Black Panther | Griot (voice) | |
| 2021 | Coming 2 America | Totatsi Bibinyana (Zamunda News Network anchor) | |
| 2022 | Black Panther: Wakanda Forever | Griot (voice) | |
| 2024 | This Is Me... Now: A Love Story | Libra | |

=== Television ===
| Year | Title | Role | Notes |
|---|---|---|---|
| 2002 | Isidingo | Teen at party | 1 episode |
| 2008 | The Amazing Date | Himself (host) | 13 episodes |
| 2008 | Strictly Come Dancing | Himself (contestant) | 8 episodes, runner-up |
| 2010–2011 | Tonight with Trevor Noah | Himself (host) | 26 episodes; also creator, writer, and executive producer |
| 2012 | Comedy Central Roast of Steve Hofmeyr | Himself (host) | TV special |
| 2012 | Gabriel Iglesias Presents Stand Up Revolution | Himself | Episode: "2.1" |
| 2014–2015 | The Daily Show with Jon Stewart | Himself (correspondent) | 5 episodes |
| 2015–2022 | The Daily Show with Trevor Noah | Himself (host) | 1,091 episodes; also writer and executive producer |
| 2017 | Nashville | Himself | Episode: "Fire and Rain" |
| 2017–2018 | The Opposition with Jordan Klepper | None | 128 episodes; co-creator and executive producer |
| 2018 | American Vandal | Himself | Episode: "The Brownout" |
| 2019 | Klepper | None | 8 episodes; executive producer |
| 2021 | 63rd Annual Grammy Awards | Himself (host) | TV special |
| 2021 | Player vs Player | Himself (host) | 8 episodes; also creator and executive producer |
| 2022 | 64th Annual Grammy Awards | Himself (host) | TV special |
| 2022 | White House Correspondents' Dinner | Himself (host) | TV special |
| 2023 | 65th Annual Grammy Awards | Himself (host) | TV special |
| 2023 | StoryBots: Answer Time | Stacy | Episode: "Internet" |
| 2024 | 66th Annual Grammy Awards | Himself (host) | TV special |
| 2025 | 67th Annual Grammy Awards | Himself (host) | TV special |
| 2026 | 68th Annual Grammy Awards | Himself (host) | TV special |

=== Stand-up specials ===
| Year | Title | Platform |
|---|---|---|
| 2009 | Trevor Noah: The Daywalker | Podium |
| 2011 | Trevor Noah: Crazy Normal | Day 1 Films |
| 2012 | Trevor Noah: That's Racist | Day 1 Films |
| 2013 | Trevor Noah: African American | Showtime |
| 2014 | Trevor Noah: It's My Culture | Day 1 Films |
| 2015 | Trevor Noah: Lost in Translation | Ark Angel Entertainment |
| 2015 | Trevor Noah: Pay Back the Funny | Day 1 Films |
| 2017 | Trevor Noah: Afraid of the Dark | Netflix |
| 2017 | Trevor Noah: There's a Gupta on My Stoep | YouTube |
| 2018 | Trevor Noah: Son of Patricia | Netflix |
| 2022 | Trevor Noah: I Wish You Would | Netflix |
| 2023 | Trevor Noah: Where Was I | Netflix |
| 2026 | Trevor Noah: Joy in the Trenches | Netflix |

== Awards and nominations ==
Over his career, he has received two Primetime Emmy Awards, as well as nominations for four Grammy Awards and a Golden Globe Award. In 2023, he won the Erasmus Prize.

== Discography ==
- 2016: Born a Crime: Stories from a South African Childhood, Audible Studios, ISBN 978-1-5318-6504-7
- 2017: Afraid of the Dark, Netflix
- 2019: Son of Patricia, Netflix

== Bibliography ==
- Noah, Trevor (2016). Born a Crime: Stories from a South African Childhood. Spiegel & Grau. ISBN 978-0-399-58817-4.
- Noah, Trevor (2024). Into the Uncut Grass. Penguin Books. ISBN 978-0-593-72996-0.

== Notes ==
Media offices
| Preceded by Jon Stewart | Host of The Daily Show; 2015–2022 | Succeeded by Jon Stewart |
