= Frankel Eight case =

2018 Constitutional Court of South Africa case

Levenstein v. Estate of Frankel
- Court: Constitutional Court of South Africa
- Decided: 2018

Case history
- Prior action: Johannesburg High Court ruling
- Appealed from: Paul Diamond; Shane Rothquel; Marinda Smit; Nicole Levenstein; George and Kathryn Rosenberg; Daniella McNally; Lisa Wegner

Levenstein v. Estate of Frankel, also known as the Frankel Eight case, was a legal proceeding in South Africa that led to changes in the legislation governing sexual offences. It resulted in the removal of the 20-year prescription limit on prosecuting sexual crimes other than rape. The case was brought by eight complainants who argued that the previous law prevented them from obtaining justice for sexual abuse they had experienced as children.

== Background ==
The case began after businessman Sidney Frankel was accused of sexually assaulting several minors many years earlier. Because the alleged offences were time-barred, prosecutors stated that they could not pursue charges. The survivors then filed a complaint, arguing that the law was "unfair and unconstitutional."

The eight applicants, who later became known as the "Frankel Eight," were Paul Diamond, Shane Rothquel, Marinda Smith, Nicole Levenstein, George and Katherine Rosenberg, Daniela McNally, and Lisa Wegner.

=== Paul Diamond ===
The public emergence of the allegations that later formed the Frankel Eight case began in 2016, when several individuals disclosed accounts of sexual abuse they said occurred when they were minors and involved Johannesburg businessman Sidney Frankel. Paul Diamond, a strategic investor active in property, financial services, and private equity across the United States, South Africa, Zimbabwe, and the United Kingdom, was among the first complainants to speak publicly about their experiences. The disclosure attracted media attention and helped reconnect additional survivors who later joined the constitutional challenge.

== Court proceedings ==
In 2017, the Johannesburg High Court ruled that Section 18 of the Criminal Procedure Act was unconstitutional because it discriminated between categories of sexual-offence victims.

The Constitutional Court upheld the ruling in 2018. From that point onward, all sexual offences in South Africa became exempt from any statutory limitation period.

The Harvard Law Review noted that the judgment in Levenstein v. Estate of Frankel "redefined equality and access to justice for victims of sexual violence in South Africa."
