= National Register for Sex Offenders =

Sex offender registry in South Africa

The National Register for Sex Offenders (NRSO) is a sex offender registry in South Africa which contains the details of people convicted of sexual offences against children or mentally disabled people.

Those listed on the register are prohibited from working with children or the mentally disabled, and from adopting children or acting as foster parents. The register is not currently accessible to the public.

The NRSO was created by Chapter 6 of the Criminal Law (Sexual Offences and Related Matters) Amendment Act, 2007. It came into being on 30 June 2009 under the administration of the Department of Justice and Constitutional Development.

Details of offenders convicted before the creation of the register were collected from existing records held by various government departments, while details of offenders convicted since the creation of the register are added by the convicting court.

In 2025, South African President Cyril Ramaphosa emphasized that gender-based violence laws in the country should be strengthened.

Also in 2025, Justice and Constitutional Development Minister Mmamoloko Kubayi advocated for the National Register for Sex Offenders to be made public, and committed to amending the law in order to do so, while maintaining POPIA compliance, to strike a balance between privacy and public safety. The Minister stated that changes would be implemented in 3 phases.

The first phase is to be a review process, wherein the legality of the new law would be assessed, and relevant stakeholders - such as legal experts, institutions, and the Office of the Information Regulator - would be consulted.

Th second phase entails a directive to give access to the register to institutions working directly with children, including schools, Early Childhood Development (ECD) centers, and regulatory bodies like the South African Council for Educators (SACE). This is to ensure that individuals convicted of sexual offenses are not placed in positions of trust over children.

The third phase entails expanding access to the register to general employers, so as to encourage safer hiring practices, while maintaining appropriate legal protections for personal data.

South African non-profit Women for Change (WFC), an organization dedicated to combating Gender-Based Violence and Femicide (GBVF), welcomed the law's amendment to make the register publicly-accessible, stating that doing so would allow for increased accountability for those who have committed sexual crimes, reducing their ability to offend again without consequence. The organization also stated that a public register would provide access to important information that would lead to safer communities.

Finally, WFC said that with potential offenders knowing that their names will be made public, they may be prevented from committing sexual crimes, and that a public register would thus have a positive societal impact by serving as a powerful deterrent to would-be sexual criminals.
