= Immorality and Prohibition of Mixed Marriages Amendment Act, 1985 =

Act of the Parliament of South Africa

Parliament of South Africa
- Long title: Act to amend the provisions of the Immorality Act, 1957, and the Criminal Procedure Act, 1977, in so far as they relate to unlawful carnal intercourse between white persons and coloured persons; to repeal the Prohibition of Mixed Marriages Act, 1949; and to provide for matters connected therewith.
- Citation: Act No. 72 of 1985
- Enacted by: Parliament of South Africa
- Assented to: 12 June 1985
- Commenced: 19 June 1985

Amends
- Immorality Act, 1957; Criminal Procedure Act, 1977

Repeals
- Prohibition of Mixed Marriages Act, 1949
- Status: Spent

The Immorality and Prohibition of Mixed Marriages Amendment Act, 1985 (Act No. 72 of 1985) is an act of the Parliament of South Africa that repealed the laws prohibiting marriage and sexual intercourse between white people and people of other races. It was one of the early legislative steps towards the end of apartheid.

== Background ==
The act repealed section 16 of the Immorality Act, 1957, which prohibited extramarital sex between a white person and a non-white person. It also made other consequential amendments related to the repeal of section 16, and removed the higher penalties for brothel-keeping and procuring when the sex in question was interracial. It also amended certain sections of the Criminal Procedure Act, 1977, that referred to violations of section 16.

It also repealed the Prohibition of Mixed Marriages Act, 1949, which prohibited a white person and a non-white person from contracting a marriage and invalidated any such marriage contracted outside South Africa by a South African citizen or resident. The repeal did not automatically validate such marriages previously invalidated, but allowed the spouses to apply to the Director-General of Home Affairs to have the marriage validated.

== See also ==
- Immorality Act
