= Prohibition of Mixed Marriages Act, 1949 =

South African apartheid law

Parliament of South Africa
- Long title: Act to prohibit marriages between white and black people, and to provide for matters incidental there after.
- Citation: Act No. 55 of 1949
- Enacted by: Parliament of South Africa
- Assented to by: Governor-General Gideon Brand van Zyl
- Royal assent: 1 July 1949
- Commenced: 8 July 1949
- Repealed: 19 June 1985

Amended by
- Prohibition of Mixed Marriages Amendment Act, 1968

Repealed by
- Immorality and Prohibition of Mixed Marriages Amendment Act, 1985

Related legislation
- Immorality Act
- Status: Repealed

The Prohibition of Mixed Marriages Act, Act No. 55 of 1949, was an apartheid-era law in South Africa that prohibited marriages between "whites" and "non-whites". It was among the first pieces of apartheid legislation to be passed after the National Party's rise to power in 1948. Subsequent legislation, especially the Population Registration and Immorality Acts of 1950, facilitated its implementation by requiring all individuals living in South Africa to register as a member of one of four officially defined racial groups (black, white, Indian and coloured) prohibiting extramarital sexual relationships between those classified as "white" on the one hand and those classified as "non-White" (Black Lives , Coloureds, later also Asians) on the other. It did not criminalise sexual relationships between those classified as "non-Europeans".

== History ==
=== Background ===
Interracial marriages occurred in what is now South Africa as far back as 1612, and often took place between Dutch colonists and Khoikhoi, San or Xhosa women.

While interracial marriages did not become completely taboo until the rise of the National Party in 1948, in the years immediately preceding the passing of this Act, interracial marriages accounted for just a small fraction of all marriages in South Africa, and occurred almost evenly between the four defined racial groups (Black, Coloured, White and Indian).

=== Implementation ===
In July 1949, the Prohibition of Mixed Marriages Act, Act No 55 of 1949 that prohibited marriage or a sexual relationship between White people and people of other race groups in South Africa was passed. Enforcement of the act was left to the police, who often followed people to their homes to ensure they were not in violation and raided the homes of those believed to be in a mixed marriage. The act applied to all interracial marriages between South Africans, so even marriages which took place in another country were not recognised within South Africa. The punishment for people found to be in a mixed marriage involved arrest and a jail sentence. Anyone who knowingly officiated a marriage that violated the act was also subject to a punishment: a fine was imposed not exceeding 50 pounds. Anyone who was found to have lied to an officiant was also subject to the legal punishment for perjury.

Some of the social consequences of entering into a mixed-race marriage included being ostracised from or ridiculed by one's family and community. One example is a white South African sex worker named Ethal, who indicated that she felt more accepted by her peers when she was a sex worker than when she married a black African man.

In 1972, over 400 people were convicted under the act. These numbers had dropped to 187 people prosecuted and 97 convicted in 1980, with increased leniency shown towards Indians and Coloureds. In 1982, Prime Minister P.W. Botha gave Ian Whiteley, a white man, and his Indian wife, Sherrin, his blessing for the couple to live at the edge of an Indian township in Pietersburg.

=== Legislative history ===
The Prohibition of Mixed Marriages Amendment Act of 1968 updated the original legislation to invalidate interracial marriages involving a South African citizen that were contracted in other countries

The Prohibition of Mixed Marriages Act was repealed by the Immorality and Prohibition of Mixed Marriages Amendment Act, 1985, which was passed during the presidency of P. W. Botha.

== See also ==
- Anti-miscegenation laws
- Apartheid legislation in South Africa
- Interracial marriage
