= Executive Order 12968 =

1995 US executive order signed by Bill Clinton

Executive Order 12968 was signed by U.S. President Bill Clinton on August 2, 1995. It established uniform policies for allowing employees of the federal government access to classified information. It detailed standards for disclosure, eligibility requirements and levels of access, and administrative procedures for granting or denying access and for appealing such determinations. It expanded on the President Dwight D. Eisenhower's Executive Order 10450 of 1953.

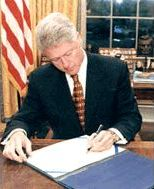
President Bill Clinton signs a document in the Oval Office at the White House

Executive Order 12968 required as an initial condition of access to classified information the filing of financial disclosure statements "including information with respect to the spouse and dependent children of the employee" with possible annual updates, as well as the reporting of all foreign travel. These requirements constituted a response to the recent Aldrich Ames spy case. In another innovation, those receiving security clearances would now have to provide information that the government previously had to acquire through its own investigations. As a counterbalance to the new burdens placed on employees, Executive Order 12968 detailed that an applicant for a security clearance had a right to a hearing and to a written explanation and documentation if denied.

Civil liberties groups expressed concerns about the intrusiveness of the disclosure requirements. The usefulness of the financial information remained a subject of debate.

Executive Order 12968's anti-discrimination statement, "The United States Government does not discriminate on the basis of race, color, religion, sex, national origin, disability, or sexual orientation in granting access to classified information." responded to longstanding complaints by advocates for gay and lesbian rights by including "sexual orientation" for the first time in an Executive Order. It also said that "no inference" about suitability for access to classified information "may be raised solely on the basis of the sexual orientation of the employee."

The federal government had for decades assumed that homosexuality constituted a disqualification for holding a security clearance, despite the opposite findings of the U.S. Navy's Crittenden Report in 1957. A 1990 U.S. Appeals Court decision, High Tech Gays v. Defense Industrial Security Clearance Office, upheld the denial of security clearances to homosexual employees of government contractors. In 1992, U.S. Army Col. Margarethe Cammermeyer had revealed she was a lesbian during a review of her top secret security clearance and received an honorable discharge, and her subsequent lawsuit helped keep the issue in the news.

Elizabeth Birch, executive director of the Human Rights Campaign Fund, called the Executive Order "an important step toward ending governmentally sanctioned job-discrimination against gay and lesbian people." An analyst for the Family Research Council, a conservative group, issued a statement saying homosexuality "is a behavior that is associated with a lot of anti-security markers such as drug and alcohol abuse, promiscuity and violence" and "in all healthy societies, homosexuality is recognized as a pathology with very serious implications for a person's behavior." It raised the issue of blackmail as well: "If someone is an avowed homosexual and that is well known, the vulnerability to blackmail is not nearly as pertinent. Fortunately or unfortunately, the vast majority of homosexuals in this country are not wearing that on their lapel pin." Franklin Kameny, whose homosexuality prompted his firing from government service in 1957 and who had participated in the campaign to end the ban on homosexuals in the Federal Civil Service that proved successful in 1975, said: "There has been a gradual falloff in enforcement over the years. What this represents is the next step. The Government has gone beyond simply ceasing to be a hostile and vicious adversary and has now become an ally." Representative Barney Frank, whom presidential advisor George Stephanopoulos called a "dogged advocate" for the new policy, said: "It relieves an enormous strain in the lives of many decent people. It's one more denunciation of the myth that gay or lesbian people are less than full, good citizens."

In 1996, the Servicemembers Legal Defense Network, an organization that advocated on behalf of gays and lesbians in the U.S. military, reported that it discovered "fewer cases involving security violations", that is, inappropriate questioning about sexual orientation, following the issuance of this Executive Order.

Executive Order 12968 also addressed evaluating the mental health of an employee seeking a security clearance. It included a proviso that "No negative inference" about eligibility "may be raised solely on the basis of mental health counseling."

In 1997, Daniel Patrick Moynihan noted that the nondiscrimination promises of this Executive Order and its guarantees of transparency with respect to reasons for denying a security clearance had yet to be fully implemented.

Executive Order 12968 was amended by Executive Order 13467 on June 30, 2008.

== See also ==
- Executive order (United States)
