= Perry Watkins =

US Army soldier

- Watkins in 1983
- Born: August 20, 1948; Joplin, Missouri, U.S.
- Died: March 17, 1996 (aged 47); Tacoma, Washington, U.S.
- Other name: Simone
- Occupation: United States soldier
- Known for: Fighting the gay-exclusionary policy of the United States military
- Military career
- Allegiance: United States
- Branch: United States Army
- Rank: Sergeant First Class

Perry Watkins (August 20, 1948 – March 17, 1996) was an American soldier. A gay man, he was one of the first servicemembers to challenge the ban against homosexuals in the United States military.

== Early life and military career ==
Perry James Henry Watkins was born in Joplin, Missouri, on August 20, 1948, the son of Ola Watkins, a nurse. He moved with his family as a teenager and attended Tacoma Lincoln High School, where he was open about being gay. He studied dance and won speech tournaments. In August 1967, he was living in Germany where his stepfather was serving in the U.S. military, when he was drafted and at his initial examination told an Army psychiatrist he was gay. During his induction examination in Tacoma, Washington in May 1968, he stated that he was homosexual when asked, but the doctor still categorized him as "qualified for military service". He did not take any legal action or protest being drafted.

Initially assigned to serve as a chaplain's assistant, Watkins was removed from that position because he was gay, but not discharged. He was trained as a personnel clerk. When harassed for being gay, he made his willingness to defend himself clear and was left alone. Throughout his military career, he made no secret of his sexual orientation.

After being discharged at the end of his tour of duty on May 8, 1970, he found himself unable to find a good job and a year later reenlisted in order to further his education. He again affirmed his sexual orientation and was re-admitted. At times he dressed in drag and performed as a female impersonator under the name Simone, first in civilian life and then while stationed in West Germany where he performed at shows sponsored by the Army. His success led to engagements at enlisted men's clubs on other U.S. bases in Europe. At one point in 1972 military investigators considered removing him from the service on account of his sexual orientation but ended their investigation with the conclusion that his own admissions were insufficient and closed their investigation when Watkins would not provide the names of any others. Other assignments took him to Korea and then to Italy. He reenlisted for a six-year term in 1974.

Another investigation of his sexual orientation ended in October 1975 with a decision that his excellent service record warranted his retention despite his homosexuality. His security clearance was reviewed after another investigation in 1978 at the insistence of his commanding officer. He enlisted for another three years in 1979, the third time he had re-enlisted without being challenged, and decided to serve twenty years in the Army to retire with a pension. He had earned a B.A. in business administration.

== Lawsuits ==
Stationed in Tacoma where he had grown up, another review of Watkins' security clearance led the Army to revoke it, preventing his promotion from staff sergeant to sergeant first class. In February 1981, represented by an ACLU attorney, he appealed the denial of his security clearance. He wrote in his appeal: "I submit that I have been consistently penalized for my honesty. I will always continue to admit my homosexuality in the future. The Army has seen fit, on numerous occasions, to decide that my homosexuality is no obstacle to my military career." When the Army did not acknowledge Watkins' letter of appeal, his attorney filed suit in federal district court in Seattle. The Army responded with discharge proceedings. Under new regulations that deemed admission of homosexuality, even in the absence of any overt acts, sufficient grounds for dismissal, Watkins' letter admitting homosexuality would be used against him. The Army, despite recently losing in court and settling its dispute with another gay servicemember, Leonard Matlovich, expected to win its case against Watkins. The Army cited Watkins' failure to answer questions about his intentions with respect to future homosexual conduct, but in October 1982, District Judge Barbara Rothstein ruled for Watkins, finding that the Army was estopped from using Watkins' statements against him after repeatedly allowing him to serve and granting him security clearances despite knowing he was gay. As the case proceeded, the Army allowed Watkins to reenlist for another 6 years with the understanding that he would be separated from the military if the District Court's decision was not upheld. In 1983, the Army prevented him from dancing in drag at an Army recreation center at Fort Lewis, Washington. A three-judge panel of the Ninth Circuit Court of Appeals reversed the District Court's decision in 1983, finding that the lower court could not require Army officials to act in contradiction of Army regulations unless the regulations themselves were ruled invalid.

Watkins was separated from the service at the end of his enlistment period in 1984. He worked in the Tacoma office of the Social Security Administration from 1984 to 1994.

Watkins continued to challenge his discharge because the military's policy of excluding gays and lesbians from service was unconstitutional. In 1988, he commented: "For 16 years the Army said being homosexual wasn't detrimental to my job. Then, after the fact, they said it was. Logic is a lost art in the Army." The American Psychological Association filed an amicus brief in his case when it reached the Ninth Circuit.

A three-judge panel of the Ninth Circuit decided 2 to 1 in his favor in Watkins v. United States Army. The court held that homosexuals constitute a "suspect class" and that the court must apply "strict scrutiny" to determine whether there is a compelling state interest that justifies a statute or regulation that distinguishes homosexuals as a category. Using that analysis, the panel held that the exclusion of homosexuals from military service violated the equal protection clause of the Fourteenth Amendment. It specifically addressed only exclusion based on someone's sexual orientation (homosexuality as status), not exclusion based on behaviors associated with one's sexual orientation (homosexuality as conduct). The New York Times accepted the distinction and praised the decision: "Gay people should not be denied the opportunity for military service solely based on their sexual preference, as distinguished from their behavior.... A military regulation that so trashes careers, talent and tolerance deserves no respect from Congress or the courts." In June 1988, the Ninth Circuit agreed to rehear the case en banc. The eleven-judge panel found that the Army was estopped from using Watkins' statements and behavior against him but did not address the constitutional issues. It was the first time a U.S. appellate court ruled against the U.S. military's ban on service by gays and lesbians. The Bush administration sought Supreme Court review of that decision without success. Watkins initially planned to reenlist, but settled instead for a retroactive promotion to sergeant first class, $135,000 in retroactive pay, full retirement benefits, and an honorable discharge.

== Later years ==
Watkins served as one of the grand marshals of New York City's Gay Pride Parade in June 1993. He told an interviewer at the time:

Racism within the gay community is a big problem. The primary reason is that we are a direct reflection of the society from which we come, which is controlled by white males. When the gay community was formed and became political, the leaders were white men, and they brought their prejudices with them.

According to Watkins, advocates for allowing gays and lesbians to serve openly in the military never sought his advice, used his story or asked him to participate in their campaigns, leaving him with a feeling of betrayal. The individuals chosen to play such a role where white veterans like Keith Meinhold and Joseph Steffan. Watkins' experience as a drag artist and frank admissions of sexual encounters with other male servicemembers created a "public relations problem" in the words of Tom Stoddard, head of Lambda Legal. Referring to Margarethe Cammermeyer, who was embraced by movement leaders, Watkins wrote: "We'll go with a [white] woman who led a lie for 56 years before we go with a black man who had to live the struggle nearly every day of his life."

Watkins died on March 17, 1996, at his home in Tacoma, Washington, of complications relating to AIDS.

== Legacy ==
A 1994 documentary film, Sis: The Perry Watkins Story, recounts his career as a female impersonator.

The University of Michigan Law School awards a fellowship named in Watkins’ honor (the Perry Watkins Fellowship) annually.

Papers related to his lawsuits are held at the Lambda Archives of San Diego.

Season 3, episode 2 of the podcast Making Gay History is about him.

== See also ==
- Sexual orientation and the United States military
