= Sexual orientation in the United States military =

The United States military formerly excluded gay men, bisexuals, and lesbians from service. In 1993, the United States Congress passed, and President Bill Clinton signed, a law instituting the policy commonly referred to as "Don't ask, don't tell" (DADT), which allowed gay, lesbian, and bisexual people to serve as long as they did not reveal their sexual orientation. Although there were isolated instances in which service personnel were met with limited success through lawsuits, efforts to end the ban on openly gay, lesbian, and bisexual people serving either legislatively or through the courts initially proved unsuccessful.

In 2010, two federal courts ruled the ban on openly gay, lesbian, and bisexual service personnel unconstitutional, and on July 6, 2011, a federal appeals court suspended the DADT policy. In December 2010, the House and Senate passed and President Barack Obama signed the Don't Ask, Don't Tell Repeal Act of 2010, and under its provisions, restrictions on service by gay, lesbian, and bisexual personnel ended as of September 20, 2011.

According to a RAND Corporation report, a 2015 survey of over 16,000 service members found that 5.8% of the respondents identified as being lesbian, gay or bisexual. When separated by gender, 1.9% of males identified as gay and 2.0% as bisexual, while 7.0% of females identified as lesbian and 9.1% as bisexual.

In June 2024, US President Joe Biden signed a “pardon proclamation” - that formally affected thousands of military veterans with historical gay sex criminal records.

== History ==
=== Early years ===
To train the new American Army in the latest military drills and tactics, General George Washington brought in Friedrich Wilhelm von Steuben (1730–94), who had been an officer on the Prussian General staff. Von Steuben escaped Germany where he was threatened with prosecution for homosexuality. He joined Washington's army at Valley Forge in February 1778 accompanied by two young aides. Steuben became an American general, and a senior advisor to Washington. Despite rumors about his parties, there never was an investigation of Steuben and he received a Congressional pension after the war.

The first evidence of antipathy to homosexuals serving in the United States military dates from March 11, 1778, when Lieutenant Frederick Gotthold Enslin was drummed out of the Continental Army following his conviction at court-martial on charges of sodomy and perjury.

=== 1910s–1940s ===
The U.S. military discharged soldiers for homosexual acts throughout the eighteenth and nineteenth century even in the absence of any explicit prohibition of sodomy. The Articles of War of the United States of 1916, implemented on March 1, 1917, included Article 93 stating that any person subject to military law who committed "assault with intent to commit sodomy" shall be punished as a court-martial may direct. That was modified on June 4, 1920, to make the act of sodomy itself a crime. The change went into effect on February 4, 1921. It was the first express prohibition of homosexuality or homosexual conduct in the armed forces of the United States.

The several branches of the U.S. armed forces lacked a unified policy on service by homosexuals for most of their history. Before 1949, each tended to charge personnel caught engaging in homosexual conduct with sodomy, court-martial them, and issue them a dishonorable discharge. In 1940, psychiatrists Harry Stack Sullivan and Winfred Overholser formulated guidelines for psychiatric screening for military inductees. Both believed homosexuals should not be inducted, and neither proposed excluding all homosexuals from military service. Despite their recommendations, other psychiatrists and military officials made homosexuality a key component of the screening apparatus they recommended. The United States Army Surgeon General's office issued a circular in 1941 that for the first time classified "homosexual proclivities" as disqualifying inductees from military service. The United States Navy and the Selective Service adopted similar exclusionary policies. The Women's Army Corps adopted a similar policy in 1944. The Women's Army Corps instituted harsh screening policies for recruits, often based on physical appearance and gender conformity, in order to exclude lesbians from service. WAC policies also condoned heterosexual relationships with servicemen in order to discourage homosexual conduct.

With the mass mobilization and deployment of troops for operations in World War II, it became impractical to convene court-martial boards for homosexual conduct offenses. Commanders instead issued blue discharges – a form of administrative military discharge – to homosexual personnel. However, blue discharge holders faced difficulties in civilian life because the blue discharge carried with it a negative association. The Veterans Administration denied blue-discharge veterans the benefits of the G.I. Bill as a general policy. In 1944, a policy directive ordered that homosexuals were to be committed to military hospitals, examined by psychiatrists and discharged under Regulation 615-360, section 8.

For example, staff sergeant Allen Irvin Bernstein, who was arrested in January 1944 by military police after a failed pickup attempt with another soldier, was confined in a psychiatric ward at Camp Lee, Virginia, and discharged within a month. He subsequently appealed the discharge decision, attaching a copy of his 140-page defense of homosexuality, Millions of Queers (Our Homo America), which, however, was ignored and remained forgotten and unpublished until rediscovered in 2010 by a researcher in the National Library of Medicine. Denied all veterans benefits, Bernstein continued to refile appeals with the Army until, 37 years later in 1981, the Army accepted his appeal and retroactively converted his blue discharge to an honorable discharge.

Blue discharges were discontinued in May 1947 and replaced with two new headings, "general" and "undesirable". A general discharge was considered to be under honorable conditions though distinct from an "honorable discharge". An undesirable discharge was under conditions other than honorable, yet distinct from a "dishonorable discharge". The Army also changed its regulations to ensure that homosexuals would not qualify for general discharges. Under this system, a service member found to be homosexual but who had not committed any homosexual acts while in service received an undesirable discharge. Those found guilty of engaging in homosexual conduct were dishonorably discharged.

In 1945, four honorably discharged gay veterans formed the Veterans Benevolent Association, the first such organization. It was primarily social in nature and its membership peaked at 100. The group disbanded in 1954, and several of its members later formed the New York chapter of homophile advocacy group One, Inc.

=== Standard policy, 1949–1993 ===
In October 1949, the newly consolidated Department of Defense standardized anti-homosexual regulations across all branches of the military: "Homosexual personnel, irrespective of sex, should not be permitted to serve in any branch of the Armed Forces in any capacity, and prompt separation of known homosexuals from the Armed Forces is mandatory."

President Harry S. Truman signed legislation on May 6, 1950, creating the Uniform Code of Military Justice, which became effective on May 31, 1951. It established a single justice system for the armed forces. Its Article 125 forbids sodomy among all military personnel, defining an offender as "any person subject to this chapter who engages in unnatural carnal copulation with another person of the same or opposite sex or with an animal is guilty of sodomy. Penetration, however slight, is sufficient to complete the offence."

The success of the armed forces in pre-screening self-identified gay and bisexual people from the 1940s through 1981 remains in dispute; during the Vietnam War, some men pretended to be gay in order to avoid the draft. However, a significant number of gay and bisexual men and women did manage to pass through the screening process and serve in the military, some with special distinction.

For example, in the 1950s, the Navy medical doctor Tom Dooley received national fame for his anti-Communist and humanitarian efforts in Vietnam. He was forced to resign in March 1956 when found to have participated in homosexual activities. The Navy conducted the first official study on sexual orientation and the Navy regulations and rules. In 1957, the Crittenden Report found that gay-identified people were no more likely to be a security risk than heterosexual-identified people, but nevertheless recommended that homosexuals be excluded from service because "Homosexuality is wrong, it is evil, and it is to be branded as such."

San Francisco politician and gay rights campaigner Harvey Milk served in the United States Navy during the Korean War. He served aboard the submarine rescue ship USS Kittiwake (ASR-13) as a diving officer, later transferring to Naval Station, San Diego to serve as a diving instructor. In 1955, he was discharged from the Navy at the rank of lieutenant, junior grade, though whether his homosexuality was an issue in his discharge is doubted by researchers. (Note: Milk said numerous times that he was dishonorably discharged and claimed it was because he was gay, but Randy Shilts was skeptical of this claim, stating: "The Harvey Milk of this era was no political activist, and according to available evidence, he played the more typical balancing act between discretion and his sex drive." (p. 16) Scholar Karen Foss confirms his discharge from the Navy had no connection to his sexuality and states, "While exaggeration is a frequent campaign tactic, in Milk's case such embellishments served to demonstrate his willingness to be part of the political system while also maintain his distance from it." (See Foss, Karen. "The Logic of Folly in the Political Campaigns of Harvey Milk", in Queer Words, Queer Images, Jeffrey Ringer, ed. (1994), New York University Press. ISBN 0-8147-7441-5, p. 21.))

By the 1970s, a gay servicemember who had not committed any homosexual acts while in service generally received a general discharge, while those found to have engaged in homosexual conduct more often received undesirable discharges. Gay servicemembers received a disproportionate percentage of undesirable discharges issued.

During the 1970s, beginning with Leonard Matlovich, who was featured on the cover of Time magazine in 1975 (making him the first named openly gay person to appear on the cover of a U.S. news magazine), several high-profile court challenges to the military's regulations on homosexuality occurred, with little success, and when such successes did occur it was when the plaintiff had been open about his homosexuality from the beginning or due to the existence of the "queen for a day" rule, which stated that if a service-member was caught having sex with a person of the same gender they could avoid being discharged if the "member did not have a propensity of intent to engage in homosexual acts."

In 1981, the Department of Defense issued a new regulation on homosexuality that was designed to ensure withstanding a court challenge by developing uniform and clearly defined regulations and justifications that made homosexual status, whether self-applied or by the military, and conduct grounds for discharge (DOD Directive 1332.14 (Enlisted Administrative Separations), January 1981):

Homosexuality is incompatible with military service. The presence in the military environment of persons who engage in homosexual conduct or who, by their statements, demonstrate a propensity to engage in homosexual conduct, seriously impairs the accomplishment of the military mission. The presence of such members adversely affects the ability of the armed forces to maintain discipline, good order, and morale; to foster mutual trust and confidence among service members; to ensure the integrity of the system of rank and command; to facilitate assignment and worldwide deployment of service members who frequently must live and work in close conditions affording minimal privacy; to recruit and retain members of the armed forces; to maintain the public acceptability of military service; and to prevent breaches of security.

The directive justified the policy and removed the "queen for a day" rule that had prompted some courts to rule against the armed forces. However, the intent of the policy had also been to treat homosexuality as being akin to a disability discharge and thus ensure that anyone found engaging in homosexual activity and/or identifying as gay, would be separated with an honorable discharge. The DOD policy has since withstood most court challenges, although the United States Supreme Court has refused to weigh in on the constitutionality of the policy, preferring to allow lower courts and the United States Congress to settle the matter.

In the 1980s, many of the Democratic Party presidential candidates expressed an interest in changing the regulations concerning homosexuality in the armed forces, and, as American social mores changed, public opinion began to express more sympathy with gay people in armed forces, at least to the extent that investigations into a serviceman or -woman's sexual behavior and/or orientation were seen as a witch-hunt. "Gays in the military" became a political issue during the 1992 Presidential campaign, when Clinton, the Democratic candidate, promised to lift the military's ban on homosexual and bisexual people.

In 1992, the United States General Accounting Office published a report entitled Defense Force Management: DOD's Policy on Homosexuality, that outlined the DOD policy on homosexuality and the reasons for it. The report also included excerpts from a previously unpublished 1988 Defense Personnel Security Research and Education Center study on homosexuality that made similar conclusions as the 1957 Crittenden Report.

Some LGBT military personnel sought to overturn the military's ban on service by homosexuals. Among the earliest were Leonard Matlovich, who fought to remain in the Air Force after coming out in 1975, and Perry Watkins, who was drafted in 1967 despite disclosing his homosexuality on his induction papers. District Court judge Gerhard Gesell ordered Matlovich's reinstatement in 1980. Rather than return Matlovich to duty, the Air Force offered him a cash settlement of $160,000, which Matlovich accepted. The Army tried to discharge Watkins several times, until the United States Court of Appeals for the Ninth Circuit ordered his reinstatement in 1989 and the United States Supreme Court refused to hear the case. The appellate court, however, did not rule the military policy unconstitutional in Watkins's case. Rather, it decided that simple equity mandated that the Army could not discharge Watkins for homosexuality when it knew of his sexual orientation all along. Other high-profile discharges included those of Vernon Berg, III, Keith Meinhold, and Tracy Thorne from the Navy; Joseph Steffan from the Naval Academy; Margarethe Cammermeyer from the Washington National Guard; and Miriam Ben-Shalom from the Army Reserve.

At the height of the push to rescind the ban before DADT, Miriam Ben-Shalom joined with other discharged personnel to form the Gay, Lesbian & Bisexual Veterans of America.

=== Don't ask, don't tell, 1993–2011 ===
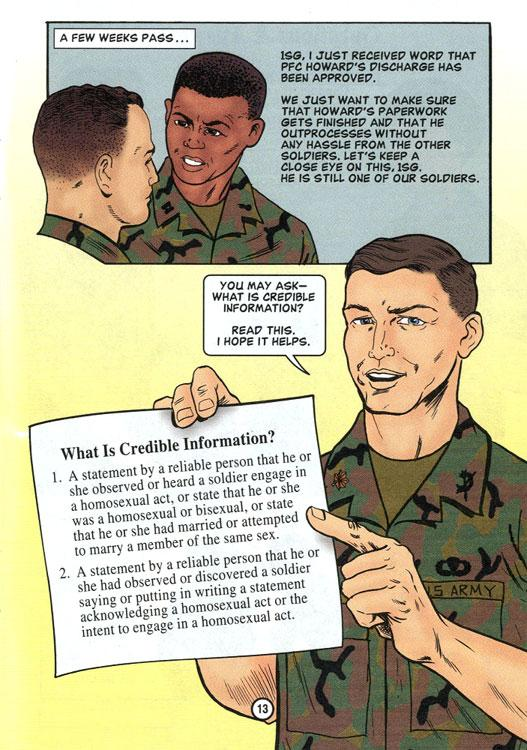
Image from a U.S. Army training manual, 2001, regarding homosexuality

Don't ask, don't tell (DADT) is the common term for the policy restricting the United States military from efforts to discover or reveal closeted gay, lesbian, and bisexual service members or applicants, while barring those that are openly gay, lesbian, or bisexual from military service.

Following the implementation of DADT, the Servicemembers Legal Defense Network was formed to protect the rights of active duty personnel. Other organizations include Servicemembers United which formed in 2005 by veterans of the wars in Iraq and Afghanistan, and groups associated with West Point (Knights Out) and the Naval Academy (USNA Out).

Service members discharged under DADT continued to seek redress through the courts without success. Courts often cited the Supreme Court's 1986 decision in Bowers v. Hardwick, which upheld the constitutionality of state sodomy laws. After the Supreme Court reversed Bowers in Lawrence v. Texas (2003), the Court of Appeals for the Armed Forces ruled that the Lawrence v. Texas decision applies to Article 125 of the Uniform Code of Military Justice, which banned all acts of sodomy. In both United States v. Stirewalt and United States v. Marcum, the court found Article 125 constitutional, but ruled that the "conduct falls within the liberty interest identified by the Supreme Court," but also said that despite the application of Lawrence to the military, Article 125 could still be upheld in cases where there are "factors unique to the military environment" that would place the conduct "outside any protected liberty interest recognized in Lawrence", such as fraternization, public sexual behavior, or anything that would adversely affect good order and discipline. Convictions for consensual sodomy have been overturned in military courts under Lawrence in United States v. Meno and United States v. Bullock. In the course of reviewing the end of DADT, the Department of Defense's Comprehensive Review Working Group recommended repealing or amending Article 125 to eliminate any ban on consensual sodomy between adults.

Major legal challenges to the DADT policy include Witt v. Department of the Air Force and Log Cabin Republicans v. United States. The first ended in a negotiated settlement, but only after the lesbian plaintiff whom the Air Force tried to discharge won retirement with full benefits in 2011 as DADT neared its end. In the second, Federal Judge Virginia A. Phillips ordered the military on October 12, 2010, to suspend and discontinue any investigation or discharge, separation, or other proceeding that began under DADT. A series of appeals and stays of her order followed in the fall of 2010 just as Congressional attempts to repeal DADT took shape.

An attempt to repeal DADT began in May 2010 when the House approved an amendment to the 2011 National Defense Authorization Act. It failed in September, when Sen. John McCain led a successful filibuster against it. In December 2010, after a second Senate filibuster, Senators Joe Lieberman and Susan Collins introduced the Don't Ask, Don't Tell Repeal Act of 2010. It passed the House of Representatives on December 15. and the Senate on December 18 by a vote of 65-31. President Barack Obama signed the bill on December 22.

On December 29, 2010, the Department of Justice asked the Ninth Circuit Court of Appeals to suspend proceedings in the Log Cabin case. Instead, on July 6, 2011, that court, citing progress made by military officials in preparing for an end to DADT, ordered the government to cease enforcement of DADT while dismantling the policy.

Repeal was not immediate. The Department of Defense first reviewed its policies and guidelines and drafted implementation regulations. Then the President, the Secretary of Defense and the Chairman of the Joint Chiefs of Staff certified that new regulations had been drafted and that the new regulations would not damage military cohesion and readiness. That certification triggered a 60-day waiting period at the end of which, on September 20, 2011, DADT expired.

==== Service academies ====
A research report that appeared in the journal Armed Forces & Society at the end of 2011 said that military academy cadets opposed allowing homosexuals to serve openly in greater percentages than participants in ROTC did, and that both groups opposed such service to a greater degree than their civilian counterparts. Some news outlets viewed this as a negative reaction to the repeal of DADT earlier in the year, but the authors of the study said it drew on survey data collected between 2002 and 2007 and believed their research provided no information about opinions following the end of DADT. They wrote that the strong degree of anti-gay sentiment found among entering cadets declined somewhat during their time at the service academies: "Surprisingly, military culture appears to have made cadets more tolerant of gays and lesbians, not less."

=== After DADT ===
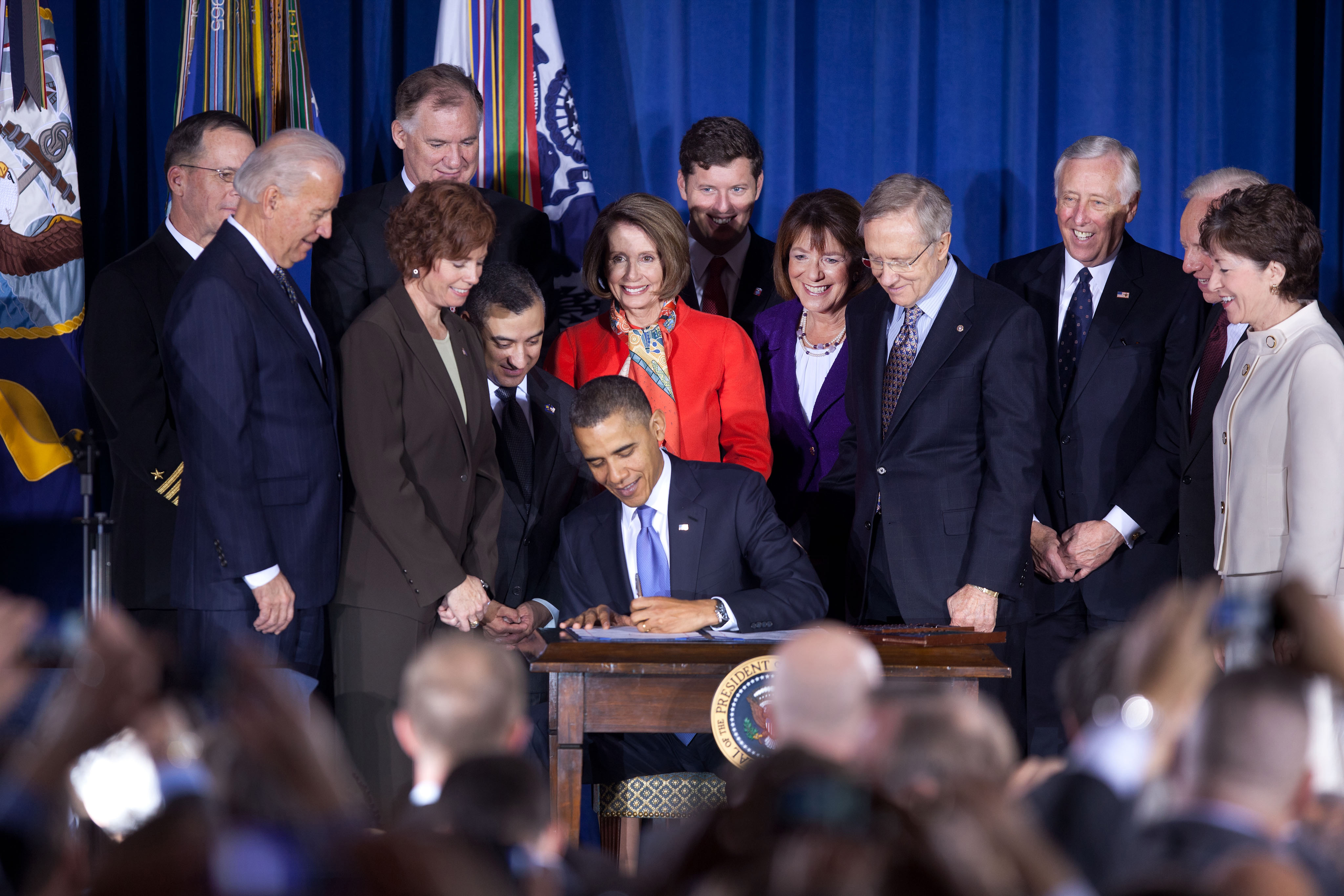
Barack Obama signing the repeal of 'Don't Ask, Don't Tell', a policy that forbade gay and lesbian people from openly serving in the United States armed forces.

==== Benefits ====
Despite the end of DADT on September 20, 2011, the same-sex spouses of gay and lesbian service members were not treated on a par with the different-sex spouses of military service members because of restrictions imposed by Section 3 of the Defense of Marriage Act (DOMA) and certain federal statutes that contain definitions of marriage that exclude same-sex couples. Same-sex spouses are denied death benefits, identification cards, base access, access to repatriation ceremonies, and other entitlements.

In December 2012, the Association of Bragg Officers Spouses (ABOS) denied membership to Ashley Broadway, the female spouse of a female Army officer. During the weeks of press coverage that ensued, Fort Bragg's commander said he lacked authority over the private organization while the U.S. Marines announced that clubs conducting business on base must admit same-sex spouses. ABOS offered Broadway a "special guest membership", which she declined. On January 26, Military Spouse magazine named Broadway Fort Bragg's 2013 "Military Spouse of the Year". That same day, ABOS invited Broadway to join and announced that its membership was open to "any Spouse of an active duty commissioned or warrant Officer with a valid marriage certificate from any state or district in the United States".

On February 11, 2013, Secretary of Defense Leon Panetta announced the Department's extension of certain military "additional benefits" to same-sex spouses which are not explicitly prohibited under the Defense of Marriage Act, in addition to "member-designated benefits" which were already available to same-sex spouses. In June 2013, the Pentagon announced plans to begin issuing identification cards to the same-sex partners of servicemembers, which will allow them to access education, survivor, commissary, travel, counseling and transportation benefits, but not health care and housing allowances.

==== Discharge pay ====
The American Civil Liberties Union (ACLU) brought suit in 2010 on behalf of servicemembers discharged for homosexuality who received only half the standard separation pay upon discharge. All were discharged under the DADT policy, but the ACLU said that the practice ante-dated the adoption of DADT. On January 7, 2013, the ACLU reached a settlement with the federal government in Collins v. United States that provided for the payment of full separation pay to servicemembers discharged under "Don't ask, don't tell" since November 10, 2004. Some 181 were expected to receive about $13,000 each.

==== Veterans associations ====
The American Military Partner Association (AMPA) was formed in 2009 to enable the LGBT partners of servicemembers and veterans to provide support in areas where the military fails to and to advocate on behalf of equal treatment of those in same-sex relationships.

==== Less than honorable discharges ====
Following the end of DADT, approximately 114,000 servicemembers who had been separated from military service since WW II under the categories "other than honorable discharge", "general discharge", or "dishonorable discharge" became eligible to have their discharges amended. Those without an honorable discharge are often excluded from veterans benefits like health care and tuition assistance, and the lack of an honorable discharge can create a hurdle to employment in the civilian sector as well. The Armed Forces established procedures for processing such requests through the Military Department Board for Correction of Military/Naval Records or the Military Department's Discharge Review Board. In June 2013, after advocates for gay and lesbian veterans complained about the process, Representatives Mark Pocan (D-Wisconsin) and Charles Rangel (D-New York) introduced the Restore Honor to Service Members Act in the House of Representatives to codify the process and reduce inconsistencies. Pocan said the legislation represented the same policies as those currently in place, but was needed because "without having it in law, it could change at some date in the future with a different administration." The American Bar Association endorsed the legislation on November 21, 2013. On January 30, 2014, Senator Brian Schatz (D-Hawaii) introduced the same legislation in the Senate.

=== After Windsor ===
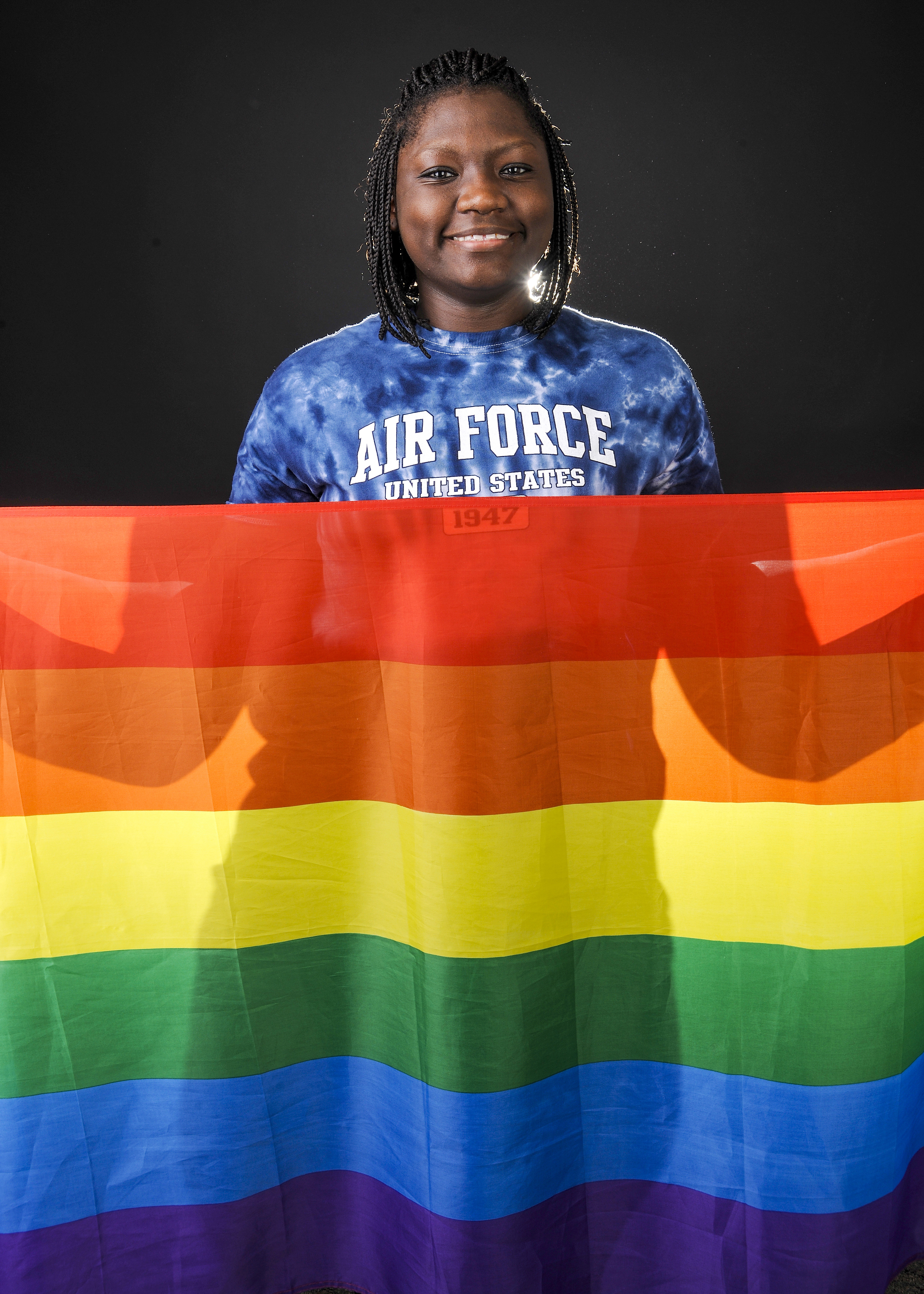
Airman 1st Class Celeste Smith, 354th Comptroller Squadron customer service technician, holds the Rainbow Flag for Lesbian, Gay, Bisexual, and Transgender Pride Month June 12, 2014. Photo removed online by Trump administration in 2025.

On June 26, 2013, the Supreme Court held in United States v. Windsor that the statute under which the U.S. military was withholding benefits from servicemembers in same-sex marriages, Section 3 of the Defense of Marriage Act, was unconstitutional. Secretary of Defense Chuck Hagel stated: "The Department of Defense welcomes the Supreme Court's decision [and] will immediately begin the process of implementing the Supreme Court's decision in consultation with the Department of Justice and other executive branch agencies. The Department of Defense intends to make the same benefits available to all military spouses—regardless of sexual orientation—as soon as possible."

On August 14, 2013, the Department of Defense (DoD) announced that it would provide spousal and family benefits to servicemembers in same-sex marriages on the same terms as it does to those in different-sex marriages. The benefits, which include health care coverage, housing allowances, military ID cards, and survivor benefits, can be claimed retroactive to June 26, the day of the Windsor decision. A same-sex marriage must be documented by a marriage certificate that establishes that the marriage was valid where it was celebrated. The DoD also announced that servicemembers who need to travel to a jurisdiction that allows them to marry will be afforded up to seven days leave to do so, up to ten days if they are stationed outside the U.S. Secretary of Defense Chuck Hagel said: "This will provide accelerated access to the full range of benefits offered to married military couples throughout the department, and help level the playing field between opposite-sex and same-sex couples seeking to be married". The DoD set September 3 as its target date for implementation. the servicemember's commander determines the amount of leave to be granted based on the servicemember's unit responsibilities and specific situation. Peter Sprigg of the Family Research Council, a longtime opponent of the end of "don't ask, don't tell", wrote that "It could well be argued that the new policy actively discriminates against opposite-sex couples, who receive no special leave for their weddings". DoD officials said the leave was for travel and cited Texas or South Korea as locations that pose problems for same-sex couples seeking to marry. The policy does not apply to those in same-sex legal relationships other than marriage, such as civil unions and domestic partnerships.

The Veterans Administration has cited other federal statutes that define "spouse" and "surviving spouse." The status of benefits for veterans in same-sex relationships was the subject of ongoing lawsuits.

==== Discrimination ====
In 2015, Defense Secretary Ash Carter added sexual orientation to the list of nondiscrimination protections under the military's equal opportunity program. However, LGBT service members and veterans continue to face discrimination in the Veterans Health Administration. Often healthcare systems deny adequate services and visitation rights to same-sex couples. HIV-positive service members overseas frequently had their possessions thrown overboard when their fellow comrades found out they tested positive.

==== Lawsuits and veterans benefits ====
Several lawsuits on behalf of same-sex military spouses had challenged the constitutionality of DOMA and statutes that define "spouse" and "surviving spouse" as "a person of the opposite sex" when determining eligibility for veterans benefits.

On October 27, 2011, the Servicemembers Legal Defense Network (SLDN) had brought suit in federal court in Massachusetts on behalf of several military servicemembers and veterans in same-sex marriages. The benefits at issue in that case, McLaughlin v. Panetta, included medical and dental benefits, basic housing and transportation allowances, family separation benefits, visitation rights in military hospitals, and survivor benefit plans. On June 27, the federal judge hearing the case asked the parties to explain by July 18 why the logic that found Windsor unconstitutional did not apply to that definition as well. On July 18, the Bipartisan Legal Advisory Group BLAG, which had defended DOMA and the restrictive definitions of marriage acknowledged that "[t]he Supreme Court recently resolved the issue of DOMA Section 3's constitutionality" but took no position on the other statutes except to say that the constitutionality of those definitions "remains open". The Department of Justice told the court that it would not defend those statutes. BLAG asked to withdraw from a similar lawsuit in federal court in California, Cooper-Harris v. United States, on July 22. On August 29, Judge Consuelo Marshall ruled that the provisions of Title 38 of the U.S. Code that define spouse so as to exclude those in same-sex marriages are unconstitutional.

A similar case involving only veterans benefits, Cardona v. Shinseki, is awaiting resolution in the Court of Appeals for Veterans Claims, after being suspended while awaiting the resolution of Windsor. On July 19, 2013, Veterans Administration (VA) Secretary Eric Shinseki noted in a letter about the case that the statutory definitions of "spouse" and "surviving spouse" had yet to be invalidated by a court. The VA is waiting for guidance from the Justice Department on how Windsor applies to those statutes. Even if that statutory limitation is invalidated, the VA's rules for establishing the validity of a marriage may restrict benefits to same-sex married couples residing in a jurisdiction that recognizes their marriage or who resided in the jurisdiction where they married. The Respect for Marriage Act sponsored by Senator Dianne Feinstein and Representative Jerrold Nadler eliminates the question of residence by establishing a rule for federal purposes that a marriage is valid if it was valid where celebrated. They reintroduced the legislation the day Windsor was decided.

On September 4, Attorney General Eric Holder, as required by law, notified Speaker of the House John Boehner that the Obama administration had determined that it should not enforce the federal statutes that define spouse in a way that excludes same-sex spouses. He cited Windsor and the decision in Cooper-Harris the previous week as well as BLAG's withdrawal from litigation challenging the statutes in question. Advocates for same-sex spouses of veterans welcomed the announcement, but noted that the question of the rights of such spouses remained uncertain if they live in states that do not recognize their marriage.

On September 13, 2013, VA home loan benefits were extended to include service members in same-sex marriages.

In June 2014, the Department of Veterans Affairs (VA) announced that it would only provide benefits to the same-sex spouses of veterans who either married in the state in which they resided or live in a state that recognizes their marriage when they apply for benefits. On August 18, the American Military Partner Association filed an appeal in the U.S. Court of Appeals for the Federal Circuit challenging the VA's interpretation of federal law. Their brief cited Windsor and many federal court decisions since Windsor that have held denial of marriage rights to same-sex couples unconstitutional. It said the VA's policy ruling "imports into federal law unconstitutional state definitions of marital status."

==== National Guard ====
In several states that did not recognize same-sex marriages– notably Oklahoma, Georgia, Louisiana, Mississippi, and Texas– National Guard officials initially refused to comply with Department of Defense directives to allow the same-sex spouses National Guard members in their states to enroll in federal benefit programs, instead requiring such members to travel to federal facilities to do so. Guard officials in Oklahoma enrolled some same-sex couples until September 5, 2013, when Governor Mary Fallin ordered an end to the practice. Defense Secretary Hagel on October 31 said he would insist on compliance.

On November 6, Fallin announced that Oklahoma guard members could have benefits requests for same-sex spouses processed at federal facilities. On November 20, after DoD officials objected to that plan, Fallin ordered that all married couples would be required to have benefits requests processed at those facilities. On November 26, Texas agreed to conform with DoD policy stating that state workers would be considered federal workers while enrolling same-sex couples for benefits. Louisiana adopted a policy like that of Texas on December 3, as did Georgia, and Mississippi the same week. On December 12, Secretary of Defense Hagel announced that all state national guard units were in compliance, though three of them–Oklahoma, Florida and South Carolina–allowed all guard members to apply for ID cards and benefits only at federal facilities. Some other states chose to place their state employees on federal status for the sake of processing such applications.

==== Sodomy law ====
The National Defense Authorization Act for Fiscal Year 2014 enacted in December 2013 repealed the ban on consensual sodomy found in Article 125 of the Uniform Code of Military Justice.

=== Obergefell ===
The 2015 U.S. Supreme Court decision in Obergefell v. Hodges legalized same-sex marriage in all 50 states, providing a means for same-sex military spouses to normalize immigration and benefits status.

=== Restoration of benefits ===
In September 2021, on the 10th anniversary of the Don't Ask, Don't Tell repeal, President Joe Biden announced that the Veterans Administration would start providing benefits for servicemembers who received other-than-honorable discharges (before DADT was enacted and while it was in effect) because of their sexual orientation.

== Healthcare needs and provisions ==
In 2014, the U.S. Veterans Health Administration (VHA) started providing healthcare services for gay and lesbian veterans. However, there are many concerns regarding the healthcare needs of the gay and lesbian veterans, and concerns have been raised about equitable treatment for gay and lesbian veterans due to stigma.

=== Response from Veterans' Health Administration ===
To alleviate the concerns from the gay and lesbian veterans about discrimination and to address healthcare disparities, in 2013, the VHA introduced policy changes. The Office of Health Equity was established to oversee the needs of LGBT veterans and to ensure that they were given equitable access to care.

In March 2024, it was announced that IVF treatment will cover single individuals and same-sex couples within the military. Also in June 2024, Joe Biden signed a “pardon proclamation” that formally affected thousands of military veterans with historical gay sex criminal records.

== See also ==
- Transgender personnel in the United States military
- Intersex people in the United States military
- Sexual orientation and military service by country
- Intersex people and military service
- American Military Partner Association
- Chris Beck (Navy SEAL), detransitioner, aka Kristin Beck
- Miriam Ben-Shalom
- Mary Elizabeth Clark
- Allen Irvin Bernstein, Army sergeant discharged in 1944, authored Millions of Queers (Our Homo America) in response
- Zoe Dunning
- Holmes v. California National Guard, 1998 federal court case
- Darren Manzella
- Newport sex scandal
- OutServe-SLDN
- Same-sex unions and military policy
- Section 839(a) of title 10 United States Code § 925 - Article 125.
- Autumn Sandeen
- Stephen Snyder-Hill
- Unfriendly Fire, a 2009 book by Nathaniel Frank
- United States Navy dog handler hazing scandal
- USS Iowa turret explosion
- Barry Winchell, Army soldier murdered in 1999
- Boots, television series about a closeted gay teenager entering the United States Marine Corps.
- Gay chicken
