= Blue Alliance =

American non-profit

The Blue Alliance
- Formation: 2007 in San Francisco
- Type: 501(c)(3)
- Legal status: Non Profit Public Benefit Corporation
- Purpose: Philanthropic
- Headquarters: Denver, CO United States
- Members: c. 210
- Executive Director: Trish Heller '87
- Staff: 1 full time/0 paid
- Website: Blue Alliance

The Blue Alliance is an American non-profit organization of lesbian, gay, bisexual and transgender (LGBT) Alumni of the US Air Force Academy in Colorado Springs, Colorado. The Blue Alliance is an independent 501(c)(3) organization that does not represent the US Air Force Academy Association of Graduates nor the USAFA.

== History ==
The group was initially formed in 2007 by 35 LGBT alumni of the Air Force Academy.

The organization continued to grow, and in November 2009 established a leadership structure to support the membership of over 200. The organization now comprises an unofficial "common interest group" among the U. S. Air Force Academy Alumni. The organization incorporated as a 501(c)(3) in the State of California in July, 2007.

On 5 November 2011, the organization held the first two organized gay events on the Air Force grounds when they held a pre-game tailgate at the USAFA stadium and held their second annual dinner in Doolittle Hall at the Academy.

== Mission ==
The Blue Alliance provides a path for "reconnection" for the many GLBT USAFA alumni who have over time been disassociated from the U. S. Air Force Academy and the USAFA Association of Graduates because of their sexuality or gender identity. By maintaining visibility, the members of the organization become role models for current Cadets, parents and family of midshipmen and for other alumni serving in the fleet.

Although most Blue Alliance members would prefer to see an end to the "Don't Ask Don't Tell" policy, political activism is not the primary mission of the organization.

== Outreach ==
One of the more revealing facts from the Blue Alliance study was that only one in six of them identify as LGBT at the time they enter the academy. The remaining 83% identify as LGBT while at the academy, in the fleet, or as civilians after completion of their service.

== See also ==
- U.S. Air Force Academy
- Knights Out
- USNA Out
- OutServe
- Josh Seefried
- Reichen Lehmkuhl
