= Allyson Robinson =

American activist

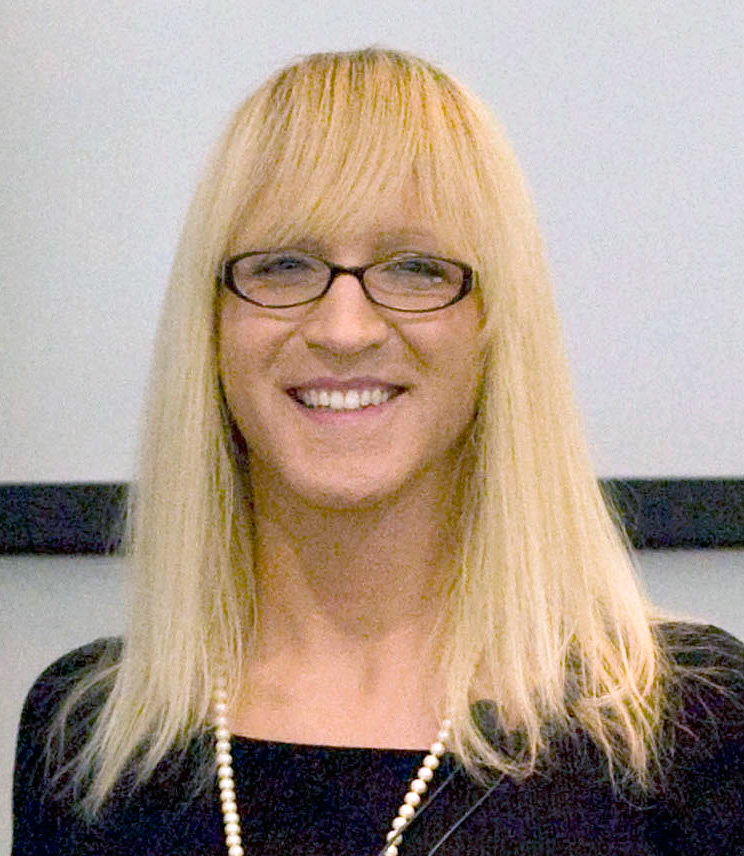
- Robinson at NASA Goddard Institute for Space Studies, 2010
- Born: Daniel F. Robinson; Scranton, Pennsylvania, US
- Known for: LGBT rights activism

Allyson Dylan Robinson is an American human rights activist, specializing in LGBT rights in the United States. She attended West Point before gender reassignment, graduated in 1994 majoring in her undergraduate degree in physics, and was then commissioned as an officer serving in the U.S. Army until 1999. She held the rank of captain. Also prior to transition, she became an ordained Baptist minister, earning from the Baylor University's George W. Truett Theological Seminary, a Master of Divinity (M.Div.).

In 2008, she joined the Human Rights Campaign (HRC), oversaw HRC's program to create model curricula for LGBT diversity training in the workplace and advanced to the executive director in 2012.

Later that year, she began a short controversial tenure as the first executive director of OutServe-SLDN, a network of LGBT actively serving military personnel, following the merger of OutServe and Servicemembers Legal Defense Network in October 2012. She was the first transgender person to lead a national LGBT rights organization that did not have an explicit transgender focus.

== Career ==
Prior to transitioning, Robinson majored in physics at West Point and graduated in 1994. She later held an internship at Los Alamos National Laboratory and then commanded a Patriot missile unit in Europe and the Middle East before leaving the U.S. Army in 1999. Following this, she became an ordained Baptist minister, earning a master of divinity degree in theology with an emphasis on social justice from Baylor University's George W. Truett Theological Seminary in 2007. After transitioning to present as female in 2007, in 2008 she visited West Point and addressed some cadets.

In 2008 she joined the HRC Foundation, where as their first deputy director for Employee Programs she oversaw HRC's program to create model curricula for LGBT diversity training in the workplace. She remained there before assuming her role as executive director in 2012.

She has been a member of the board of directors of several advocacy groups, including the International Foundation for Gender Education, the Association of Welcoming and Affirming Baptists, and Knights Out.

In October 2012 she became the first executive director of OutServe-SLDN, a network of LGBT actively serving military personnel, following the merger of OutServe and Servicemembers Legal Defense Network. She was the first transgender person to ever lead a national LGBT rights organization that does not have an explicit transgender focus.

The group was in the process of losing much of its funding base after the official September 2011 repeal of Don't ask, don't tell (DADT), the official United States policy on banning and expelling gays serving in the military enacted in 1993. Robinson was tasked with bridging the two former groups, and reworking a shrinking budget, having to lay off half the new groups' staff. Nine months after hiring her, OutServe-SLDN's board announced it was bankrupt and had to close its Washington D.C. headquarters; on the same day, Robinson announced that her resignation as executive director would take effect the following day, July 12, 2013.

In 2014, Calvary Baptist Church in Washington ordained her to the gospel ministry.

== Personal life ==
Robinson has been married to her West Point classmate Danyelle Juel (Wambach) Robinson since 1994. They have four children. At one point, Robinson contemplated suicide. She claims that an angel of the Lord named Reason convinced her not to kill herself. After this experience, she transitioned to present as female in 2007.

== Publications ==
- Robinson (May–June 2010). "The transgender patient and your practice: what physicians and staff need to know". J Med Pract Manage. 25 (6): 364–7. ISSN 8755-0229. PMID 20695249.
- Robinson (Fall 2005). "Karl Barth's Theology of Church Unity" (PDF). Truett Journal of Church and Mission. 3 (Fall 2005): 52–66. ISSN 1543-3552.
