= Zoe Dunning =

U.S. Naval Academy graduate

Maria Zoe Dunning
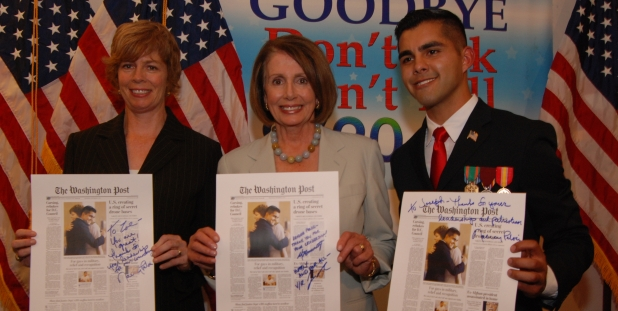
- Dunning (left) with Nancy Pelosi in 2011
- Born: Maria Zoe Dunning; July 10, 1963 (age 63); Milwaukee, WI
- Military career
- Allegiance: United States of America
- Branch: United States Navy
- Service years: 1981–2007
- Rank: Commander

Maria Zoe Dunning is a U.S. Naval Academy graduate and gay rights activist. She is known for being the only openly gay person remaining on active duty in the U.S. military after coming out. She was involved in a series of lawsuits against the U.S. military and the Don't Ask, Don't Tell policy during the 1990s.

== Biography ==
Commander Zoe Dunning, SC, USNR (Ret.) was born in Milwaukee, Wisconsin. She was nominated to the United States Naval Academy by her Congressman James Sensenbrenner and graduated with the Class of 1985 with a Bachelor of Science Degree. The Naval Academy had started admitting women in 1976 for the Class of 1980, so she was part of the fifth class of admitted women. After graduation from Annapolis, she was commissioned an ensign in the Navy Supply Corps. After attending Navy Supply Corps School in Athens, Georgia, she was assigned to the USS Lexington homeported in Pensacola, FL.

At the end of her obligated active duty service, she transferred into the United States Navy Reserve and attended Stanford Graduate School of Business in Palo Alto, California.

Commander Dunning retired from the Navy Reserve in 2007 after 22 years of service as a commissioned officer in a ceremony on board the USS Hornet (CV12) in Alameda, California.

On December 22, 2010, Commander Dunning stood beside President Barack Obama as he signed the Don't Ask, Don't Tell Repeal Act of 2010.

=== Discharge proceedings ===
In January 1993, while a student at the Stanford Graduate School of Business, she announced her homosexuality at a rally in support of Petty Officer Keith Meinhold, saying, "I am both a naval officer and a lesbian, and I refuse to live a lie anymore." Meinhold acknowledged his gay status on ABC's World News Tonight on May 19, 1992.

On June 10, 1993, a three-member Navy administrative board recommended that she be honorably discharged despite arguments that the action violated a federal judge's ruling the previous winter.

Dunning appealed and argued that she made a statement of status and not conduct. In December 1994, another three-member Navy administrative board met at Treasure Island and unanimously agreed with Dunning's argument that her public statement that she was a lesbian did not violate Don't Ask, Don't Tell. She was also promoted between those hearings. Afterwards the military released regulations that made any future use of that defense impossible.

In a letter dated May 24, 1995, the Chief of Naval Personnel wrote Dunning, "Your administrative separation case proceedings are closed, and you will be retained in the Naval Service," ending a two-year battle. She was represented by Morrison & Foerster.

=== LGBT activism ===
In December 2010, Dunning stood next to the President as he signed the DADT repeal bill.

She served as the co-chair of the Governing Board of the Servicemembers Legal Defense Network (SLDN) from its founding in 1993 until 1998, and again from 2006 to through 2011.

In November, 2003, she was one of thirty five LGBTQ alumni of the Naval Academy who petitioned the USNA Alumni Association for special status as a non-geographic chapter of the Alumni Association, similar to the association's RV chapter. The initial request was rejected on multiple grounds.

Zoe Dunning has served as a member of the Board of Directors of Stanford Pride, the Stanford LGBTQQI alumni club, since 2011, and as its vice-president since 2012.

== See also ==
- USNA Out
- Sexual orientation and the United States military

== Bibliography ==
- Shilts, Randy (1994/1997–2005). Conduct Unbecoming: Gays and Lesbians in the US Military. ISBN 5-551-97352-2 / ISBN 0-312-34264-0.
