= Vernon Berg, III =

American Naval Academy graduate and artist

Vernon Edward (Copy) Berg, III
- Vernon Edward (Copy) Berg, III
- Born: Vernon Edward Berg, III; 10 July 1951; Port Jefferson, New York
- Died: 27 January 1999 (aged 47); Manhattan, New York
- Military career
- Allegiance: United States of America
- Branch: United States Navy
- Service years: 1970–1976
- Rank: Ensign
- Nickname: Copy

Vernon E. "Copy" Berg, III (10 July 1951 – 27 January 1999) was U.S. Naval Academy graduate and artist. He was the first Naval Academy alumnus to actively fight the policies against homosexuality in the services. After Mr. Berg's suit against the Navy, which had given him an other than honorable discharge as an ensign in 1976, the armed forces adopted a policy of generally granting honorable discharges to homosexuals.

== Biography ==
Copy Berg was born on 10 July 1951 in Port Jefferson, New York. He was called Copy because he was so like his father, Commander Vernon E. Berg Jr., a Navy chaplain. He obtained a Naval & Marine Reserve appointment to U.S. Naval Academy. He graduated with the Class of 1974 with a Bachelor of Science Degree.

=== Naval Academy ===
While at the academy, Copy was known to be prolific at his art, which appeared in The Log Magazine, the Art and Printing Club posters, T-shirts, Beat Army buttons, Christmas dinner programs, and as centerfolds of programs. He could be seen dancing across the Stage of Mahan Hall in the Masqueraders' musicals. He is quoted as saying "It's not that a Midshipman can draw, write or sing well, its that a Midshipman can draw, write or sing at all."

He sang in the Protestant Chapel Choir and Naval Academy Glee Club.

=== Time in the fleet ===
After graduation from the Naval Academy, Berg reported to his first ship, the USS Little Rock (CLG-4), the Flagship for the U.S. Navy Sixth Fleet in the Mediterranean home ported in Gaeta, Italy. While at the Naval Academy, he met and fell in love with a civilian theatre director working at the academy, E. Lawrence Gibson. They were married in a small, private ceremony in New York's Central Park in 1975. At Copy's urging, Lawrence accepted a job teaching Naval personnel stationed on the Little Rock. When they began sharing Copy's apartment in Gaeta they discovered they had already been surveilled by Naval intelligence for five months. Their travails up through the Naval hearing were memorialized in Gibson's memoir Get Off My Ship: Ensign Berg v. the US Navy, published by Viking Press in 1978. The couple settled on Dean Street in Brooklyn, NY and were interviewed together on WBAI radio in 1979. They eventually split. Gibson died of natural causes in 2012.

=== Discharge and trials ===
As a result of the legal action, his discharge was upgraded to honorable in 1977.

In 1978, the United States Court of Appeals for the District of Columbia Circuit ruled that Berg and former Technical Sergeant Leonard P. Matlovich of the Air Force had been unfairly discharged, although it did not reinstate them, as both had sought. Berg was discharged after an investigation revealed he was in a gay relationship.

=== Life as an artist ===
After departing the U.S. Navy, he and Gibson moved to Brooklyn, New York, where Berg earned a master's degree in design from Pratt Institute and became a rising star in the New York arts scene and a gay rights activist. He died of AIDS in Manhattan on Wednesday 27 January 1999.

== Legacy ==
67 linear feet (161 boxes) of the Copy Berg Papers are held by the New York Public Library, Manuscripts and Archives Division.

Season 6, episode 2 of the podcast Making Gay History is about Berg.

== See also ==
- U.S. Naval Academy
- USNA Out
- Sexual orientation and the United States military
- Leonard Matlovich
- Joseph Steffan

== Bibliography ==
- Gibson, E. Lawrence (1978) Get Off My Ship ISBN 0-380-40071-5.
- Shilts, Randy (1994/1997/2005). Conduct Unbecoming: Gays and Lesbians in the US Military. ISBN 5-551-97352-2 / ISBN 0-312-34264-0.
