= Steve Clark Hall =

American filmmaker and submarine officer

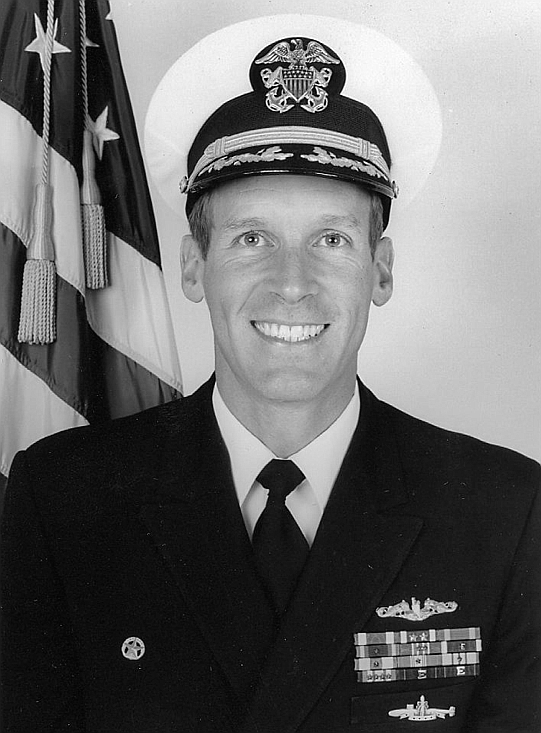
- Hall in November 1992, during his tenure as a commander.
- Born: November 9, 1953 (age 72); San Francisco, California, U.S.
- Military career
- Allegiance: United States of America
- Branch: United States Navy
- Service years: 1971-1995
- Rank: Commander
- Commands: USS Greenling (SSN-614); USS Drum (SSN-677)
- Awards: Meritorious Service Medal (2 awards); Navy Commendation Medal (3 awards); Navy Achievement Medal
- Other work: Out of Annapolis

Steve Clark Hall (born November 9, 1953) is a retired United States Navy submarine officer and documentary film maker. He is the first openly gay senior U.S. Navy officer who is a graduate of the U.S. Naval Academy.

== Early life and education ==
Steve Clark Hall was born in San Francisco on November 9, 1953, and attended high school in Eureka, California. He was nominated to the U.S. Naval Academy by Senator John V. Tunney of California. He graduated with honors in the Class of 1975 with a Bachelor of Science in Systems Engineering and rowed all four years on the Navy Lightweight Crew team. After completing his 20-year career as a nuclear submariner, he retired from Naval Service and returned to his home in the Castro District of San Francisco.

=== Career ===
After graduation from Annapolis, Steve Clark Hall entered the nuclear submarine training pipeline at the Naval Nuclear Power School in Vallejo, California. His sea tours included USS Haddock (SSN-621), Engineer Officer of USS Michigan (SSBN-727), as the Submarine Liaison Officer for Commander, Carrier Group THREE based at NAS Alameda deploying on the carriers USS Enterprise (CVN-65) and USS Carl Vinson (CVN-70), as Executive Officer of USS Permit (SSN-594) and as the Commanding Officer of the nuclear submarines USS Greenling (SSN-614) (1992–94) and USS Drum (SSN-677) (1994–95) He was the commanding officer at the time the “Drum” collided with another ship in Hong Kong. His only shore assignment was as the Executive Officer (ashore) at the Navy Program Management Office, Sunnyvale, California.

== Later work ==
After departing the U.S. Navy, Hall continued his public service, serving on the boards of various non-profit public benefit corporations including the Castro Area Planning + Action and the San Francisco Friends of City Planning. He served as President of the Castro/Eureka Valley Neighborhood Association in 2008.

=== Out of Annapolis project ===
Hall was one of 35 LGBTQ Naval Academy alumni who sought official recognition from the U.S. Naval Academy Alumni Association as the USNA Out Chapter. In July 2007, Hall began the Out of Annapolis Project which included a detailed study of the LGBT alumni of the Naval Academy. He produced and directed the documentary film by the same name, which opened at the SVA Theater in New York in June 2010.

In January 2009, after a front-page article in the Annapolis Capital brought significant awareness to the Out of Annapolis Project, Hall worked with LGBT alumni of the U.S. Military Academy to establish an association similar to USNA Out, Knights Out.

== See also ==
- Sexual orientation and the United States military
