= Get Off My Ship =

Memoir published in 1978

Get Off My Ship: Ensign Berg vs. the US Navy
- 1978 paperback edition publ. Avon Books
- Author: E. Lawrence Gibson
- Language: English
- Genre: memoir, nonfiction
- Publisher: Viking Press
- Publication date: 1978
- Publication place: United States
- Media type: Print
- Pages: 385
- ISBN: 978-0380400713

Get Off My Ship: Ensign Berg v. the US Navy (ISBN 978-0380400713) is a memoir by E. Lawrence Gibson published in two printings by Viking Press in 1978 about his relationship with Vernon Berg, III, the first officer to bring a legal challenge against the US military for anti-gay discrimination in a landmark case in the gay rights movement. In the end, a federal appeals court granted Berg a reinstatement in the Navy (which Berg declined), upgrade to Honorable Discharge, and back pay. While at the US Naval Academy, Berg met and fell in love with Gibson, a civilian theatre director working at the Academy. They were married in a small, private ceremony in New York's Central Park in 1975. At Copy's urging, Lawrence accepted a job teaching Naval personnel stationed aboard the USS Little Rock where Berg was also stationed. When they began sharing Copy's apartment in Gaeta, Italy they discovered they had already been surveilled by Naval Intelligence for 5 months. Their travails from that moment up through the conclusion of the Navy hearing are memorialized in Gibson's book. After the trial, the couple settled on Dean Street in Brooklyn, NY and were interviewed together on WBAI radio in 1979. They split in the 1980s.

The memoir's appendixes include the first public release of the Crittenden Report, a 1957 suppressed US military study concluding that there was "no sound basis for the belief that homosexuals posed a security risk...No intelligence agency, as far as can be learned, adduced any factual data...with which to support these opinions...[T]he concept that homosexuals necessarily pose a security risk is unsupported by adequate factual data."

== Author's Biography ==
Edward Lawrence Gibson was born on December 25, 1935, in rural Alta Vista, VA. He and his mother were brutally abused by his father, and he was sexually molested at a young age by a teenage neighbor. When he told his parents at age 18 that he was gay, his father urged him to commit suicide and his mother convinced him to check himself into a psychiatric hospital for aversion therapy. Gibson wrote in detail about these experiences in his personal correspondence with Copy Berg, and later in his second book, the semiautobiographical 2009 novel Escaping Dark Places (Vantage Press, ISBN 978-0533160600).

Gibson earned a bachelor's degree from Towson State Teachers College (now Towson University) in 1962, and an MA in Religious Education from Princeton Theological Seminary in 1966. While at Princeton Theological Seminary he directed a number of student productions including Albee's "The American Dream," Shaw's "Don Juan in Hell," and his own original play, "The Lament of Job," which included a presentation at the Fifth Avenue Church of New York. After settling in Brooklyn, NY with Copy Berg he became a school teacher, the bulk of his career spent as a history teacher, high school principal, and librarian at Brooklyn Friends School.

He died in Brooklyn of natural causes on August 12, 2012.
