= Allen Bernstein =

Allen Bernstein may refer to:

- Allen Irvin Bernstein (1913–2008), gay Jewish American World War II veteran and author
- Roxy Bernstein (Allen "Roxy" Bernstein, born 1972), American sportscaster

== See also ==
- Alan Bernstein (born 1947), President and CEO of the Canadian Institute for Advanced Research
