= OutServe Magazine =

- Editor-in-Chief: Angelina Leger
- Former editors: Liza Swart (March 2013-May 2013); David Small (July 2012-Feb 2013); Jonathan Mills (March 2011-June 2012) EDITORIAL BOARD: Jonathan Mills, Edward A. Sweeney, Nathaniel Frank, Brenda Sue Fulton, Zeke Stokes, Todd Burton, Marissa Skidmore
- Staff writers: Edward A. Sweeney, Chief Columnist; Angelina Leger, Operations and Art Director; William Burton, Distribution Director; Bobat Camacho, Social Media Director; Liza Swart, Asst. Editor; Aaron Testa, Online Editor; Eric Minton, Copy Editor; Jeremy Johnson, Blog Editor; Katie Miller, Columnist; Neal Simpson, Columnist; Brynn Tannehill, Columnist; Kody Parsons, Columnist; Joshua Ladner, Style Columnist
- Photographer: Samuel Morse; David Small
- Frequency: Bi-monthly
- Circulation: 250,000
- Publisher: OutServe-SLDN
- Founder: Jonathan Mills and Edward Sweeney
- First issue: March 2011
- Final issue: June 2013
- Company: OutServe
- Country: United States
- Based in: Washington, D.C.
- Language: English
- Website: www.outservemag.org
- ISSN: 2161-3370
- OCLC: 722418968

OutServe Magazine was a bi-monthly digital and print publication of OutServe, a non-profit, non-government organization for lesbian, gay, bisexual and transgender service members in the United States Armed Forces. It was co-founded by Air Force Staff Sgt. Jonathan Mills and Capt. Eddy Sweeney, and first published in March 2011, while OutServe was still operating clandestinely prior to the repeal of the "Don't Ask, Don't Tell" policy that banned open gays from service. The Magazine garnered over a quarter of a million views for its most popular issues. The publication was distributed free of charge on military bases, and was available to the public for downloading and redistribution through its website and mobile apps. It published 13 issues over 2 years, employing more than 30 volunteer staff, and was the first gay rights magazine to be approved for distribution on military bases.

== History ==
In February 2011, OutServe, Inc. launched an initiative for a newsletter that would inform LGBT service members of the fast-growing support network that was available to them, as well as inform readers on the status of DADT and other LGBT-related policies. Jonathan Mills and Eddy Sweeney expanded on this idea and created a bi-monthly magazine that sought to publish relevant information in a pre-DADT repeal environment, inform LGBT service members of various resources available to them, provide a voice for LGBT stakeholders in the military, and begin to normalize open service by introducing the Armed Services to the gay military professional.

The first electronic-only issue of the Magazine, distributed in March 2011 to OutServe network members, as well as released to the press, had over 10,000 impressions within the first 48 hours, and was met with an overwhelming show of support from the public, the Department of Defense, and the Obama administration. News organizations such as MSNBC, CNN, ABC, Der Spiegel, Stars and Stripes, and Military Times reached out to cover the launch. Writers and staff were originally attributed by pseudonyms in order to operate within the confines of DADT. In the months after, the bi-monthly publication shifted its focus from a pre-repeal environment to a post-repeal one, and the September 2011 Repeal Edition had a quarter of a million views. This issue featured, for the first time in any publication, the faces of 101 actively serving LGBT military professionals.

The Magazine featured LGBT multimedia essays by artists such as JoAnn Santangelo and Jeff Sheng, published the first public interview with Joint Chiefs of Staff Adm. Michael Mullen after his retirement (the most senior military leader charged with implementation of DADT repeal), was cited regularly by major news outlets, and partnered with more than 15 advertisers, including CIA, Barefoot Wine, Rhino Africa, MetLife, Amazon, Absolut, Miller Lite, VisitPhilly, Wells Fargo, Human Right Campaign, and Orbitz. From its launch in 2011 to its one-year anniversary in March 2012, OutServe Magazine expanded its staff from 3 to more than 30 volunteers, added a new OutServe Blog, released Android, Windows Phone, and Apple mobile apps, and expanded print and web distribution from 10,000 readers in the first month to over a quarter of a million views in 2013.

OutServe Magazine published its final issue in June 2013, under the direction of its final Editor-in-Chief Angelina Leger, one month before OutServe-SLDN's reorganization and the accompanying resignation of several of its leaders.

Archived issues can accessed at MagCloud.

== Repeal Edition ==
In September 2011, its third edition, the "Repeal Edition", revealed the identity of OutServe Co-director JD Smith as a U.S. Air Force active-duty lieutenant. The "Repeal Edition" featured 101 service members coming out to the public for the first time. It was also the first edition approved for distribution in print to military installations.
