= High Tech Gays v. Defense Industrial Security Clearance Office =

U.S. legal case

- Court: United States Court of Appeals for the Ninth Circuit
- Full case name: High Tech Gays, et al v. Defense Industrial Security Clearance Office, et al
- Argued: December 16, 1988
- Decided: February 2, 1990
- Citations: 895 F.2d 563; 60 Fair Empl.Prac.Cas. 1435; 52 Empl. Prac. Dec. (CCH) ¶ 39,608; 58 USLW 2473

Court membership
- Judges sitting: Melvin T. Brunetti, Edward Leavy, Jesse W. Curtis (C.D. Cal.)

Case opinions
- Majority: Brunetti, joined by a unanimous court

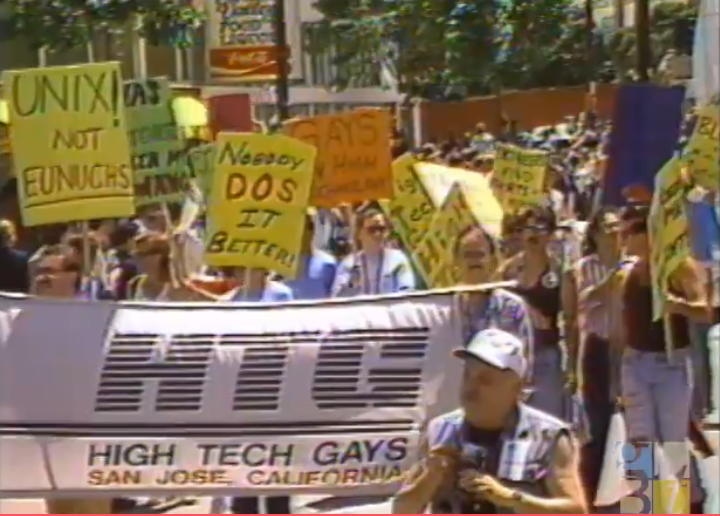
Screenshot from reel 247 showing High Tech gays at 1989 Pride parade, Charles Cyberski papers (1994-03), courtesy of the Gay, Lesbian, Bisexual, Transgender Historical Society

High Tech Gays, et al. v. Defense Industrial Security Clearance Office, et al., 895 F.2d 563 (9th Cir. 1990) was a lawsuit decided by the United States Court of Appeals for the Ninth Circuit on February 2, 1990.

In 1984, High Tech Gays, a social organization of gay people employed in the technology industry founded in 1983 in San Jose, California, challenged the policy of the Defense Industrial Security Clearance Organization (DISCO), a unit of the U.S. Department of Defense, that routinely denied security clearances to applicants who were known or thought to be homosexual. The group brought the suit as a class action with three named plaintiffs. DISCO's policy was to deny high-level security clearances to anyone who had participated in homosexual activity within the past fifteen years and to require more extensive review of applications for security clearances on the part of gays. The plaintiffs were employed by businesses doing work under contract to the Department of Defense.

In 1987, the District Court determined that laws that treat gay people as a class must be reviewed under the federal courts' heightened scrutiny standard because gay people are a "quasi-suspect class", noting that Bowers v. Hardwick held that "under the due process clause lesbians and gay men have no fundamental right to engage in sodomy". It found that the Defense Department's policy did not meet even its lowest standard of review, rational basis.

The District Court stayed the enforcement of its decision during appeal after the Department of Defense presented arguments "based on new evidence from several sources indicating that hostile intelligence agencies target persons who are especially vulnerable, and that among others, persons who are gay people are considered vulnerable by these agencies."

The Court of Appeals reversed the District Court's decision. It held that the proper standard of review was rational basis, citing Hardwick and writing that "the right to privacy inheres only in family relationships, marriage and procreation, and does not extend to all private sexual conduct between consenting adults." Addressing the other criteria that would require the use of a different standard of review, the Court added that "Homosexuality is not an immutable characteristic; it is behavioral" and "homosexuals are not without political power". It found the Defense Department's policies were based on its determination "that counterintelligence agencies target homosexuals" and therefore were "rationally related to permissible ends". It also recognized that "Special deference must be given by the court to the Executive Branch when adjudicating matters involving their decisions on protecting classified information."

The plaintiffs' complaint was addressed on August 2, 1995, when President Clinton issued Executive Order 12968 prohibiting discrimination "on the basis of race, color, religion, sex, national origin, disability, or sexual orientation in granting access to classified information".
