= USNA Out =

Non-profit of LGBT alumni of the U.S. Naval Academy

- The international maritime OSCAR signal flag - indicating "Man overboard" - with Trident
- Formation: 2003 in Annapolis
- Type: 501(c)(3)
- Legal status: Non Profit Public Benefit Corporation
- Purpose: Philanthropic
- Headquarters: Annapolis, MD, United States
- Members: c. 350
- Chairman & Vice Chairman of the Board: Dave Wolynski '97 & Brook Stevens '12
- Staff: 1 full time/0 paid
- Website: USNAOut.org

USNA Out is an American non-profit organization of lesbian, gay, bisexual and transgender (LGBT) alumni of the U. S. Naval Academy in Annapolis, Maryland. USNA Out is an independent 501(c)(3) organization that does not represent the Naval Academy Alumni Association nor the U. S. Naval Academy. It is the first LGBT organization representing alumni from a federal service academy.

== History ==
The group was initially formed in 2003 when 32 LGBT alumni of the Naval Academy petitioned the USNA Alumni Association for special status as a non-geographic chapter of the Alumni Association, similar to the special status of the association's RV chapter. The initial request was rejected on multiple grounds.

The organization continued to increase membership and incorporated as a 501(c)(3) in the State of Maryland in September, 2009. In November 2009 USNA Out realigned the leadership structure to support the growing membership of over 300. The organization now comprises an unofficial "affinity group" among the U. S. Naval Academy Alumni.

On December 22, 2010, USNA Out founding member Commander Zoe Dunning, USNR (Ret.), stood beside President Barack Obama as he signed the Don't Ask, Don't Tell Repeal Act of 2010.

USNA Out held its first annual dinner after the repeal of the Don’t Ask, Don’t Tell Act in April 2012, which was attended by 31 midshipmen from all four classes and 34 USNA Out members as well as 16 graduating seniors.

== Mission ==
USNA Out provides a path for "reconnection" for the many LGBT USNA alumni who have over time been disassociated from the U. S. Naval Academy and the USNA Alumni Association because of their sexuality or gender identity. By maintaining visibility, the members of the organization become role models for current Midshipmen, parents and family of midshipmen and for other alumni serving in the fleet.

Although many USNA Out members worked to end to the "Don't Ask Don't Tell" policy, political activism was not within the mission of the organization.

== Outreach ==
In 2007, USNA Out began the "OUT of ANNAPOLIS Project" with a goal of putting human faces and personalities to the LGBT alumni. The project included a detailed study of the alumni to establish who the alumni were as a group. It also included online profiles numerous alumni for the purpose of becoming "role models" for current midshipmen at the academy and junior officers in the fleet. In June, 2008, the OUT of ANNAPOLIS Project expanded to include a documentary film by the project title, OUT of ANNAPOLIS. The film produced and directed by Steve Clark Hall and Joseph Soto opened at the SVA Theater in New York in June, 2010.

One of the more revealing facts from the OUT of ANNAPOLIS study was that only one in six of those who enter the academy identify as LGBT at the time they enter. The remaining 83% re-identify as LGBT while at the academy, in the fleet, or as civilians after completion of their service.

== See also ==
- U.S. Naval Academy
- Knights Out
- Blue Alliance
- Zoe Dunning
- DMW Greer
- Joseph Steffan
- Vernon E "Copy" Berg, III
- Sexual orientation and the United States military
