= Knights Out =

- Formation: 2009
- Type: 501(c)(3)
- Legal status: Non Profit Public Benefit Corporation
- Purpose: Philanthropic
- Headquarters: United States
- Members: c. 450
- Executive Director: Drew Fitzsimmons
- Website: KnightsOut.org

Knights Out is an organization of West Point alumni, staff and faculty who support the rights of lesbian, gay, bisexual, and transgender (LGBT) people to serve openly in the U.S. military and who wish to educate young officers about the issues and contributions of LGBT troops. The group's name is in reference to the Army Black Knights, West Point's athletic mascot.

== History ==
In January 2009, two United States Military Academy alumni, L Paul Morris '80, and Dan Manning '04, along with Annapolis graduate Steve Clark Hall, USNA '75, started work to establish a West Point organization parallel to USNA Out, the LGBT alumni association of the United States Naval Academy. At the time, L. Paul Morris was serving as the chair of SAGALA, the joint service academy gay and lesbian alumni network, while Dan Manning was the USMA board representative. This led to the founding of Knights Out in March 2009.

Becky Kanis, USMA '91, agreed to chair the Knights Out Board and was joined on the Board by L. Paul Morris '80, Brenda S. "Sue" Fulton '80, Margaret Wilson '89, Scott Melendez ex-92, Sarah Haag '03, Dan Manning '04, and New York National Guard First Lieutenant Daniel Choi, '03. As spokesperson for the organization in 2009, Daniel Choi gained national attention for challenging the U.S. military's "don't ask, don't tell" (DADT) policy when he came out on the Rachel Maddow Show.

The core of the membership is represented by the "Out Knights," graduates and former cadets who are publicly identified on the website as lesbian, gay, bisexual, or transgender. USMA graduates and current and former Staff and Faculty who are straight or do not wish to be identified as LGBT can join as Graduate Supporters. All others are encouraged to join as Allies.

The membership has grown from 38 members to more than 400 members and allies, including over 75 Out Knights.

== Actions ==
Since its founding, members of Knights Out have spoken out in support of repealing the Don't Ask, Don't Tell policy and to educate their fellow Soldiers and citizens. Knights Out has also worked closely with the Servicemembers Legal Defense Network (SLDN) and other organizations committed to repeal. Finally, Knights Out members support West Point and the Army by speaking with Academy groups to educate and train leaders in preparation for leading a post-DADT Army.

Because the DADT repeal has been Knights Out's main project, the repeal is likely to alter the group's target. Fulton said that they will work with West Point to dispel stereotypes about LGBT soldiers.

== See also ==
- U.S. Military Academy
- USNA Out
- Blue Alliance
- OutServe
