= Executive Order 10450 =

1953 order by President Eisenhower expanding the definition of security risks

- Security Requirements for Government Employment
- Type: Executive order
- Number: 10450
- President: Dwight D. Eisenhower
- Signed: April 27, 1953

Summary
- Expanded the security criteria for government jobs; Made heads of departments and agencies responsible for review of personnel and applicant backgrounds; Added several reasons for job termination, including sexual orientation; Mandated re-appraisal of previously-reviewed background checks.

President Dwight D. Eisenhower issued Executive Order 10450 on April 27, 1953. Effective May 27, 1953, it revoked President Truman's Executive Order 9835 of 1947 and dismantled its Loyalty Review Board program. Instead, it charged the heads of federal agencies and the Civil Service Commission, supported by the Federal Bureau of Investigation (FBI), with the task of investigating federal employees to determine whether they posed security risks. It expanded the definitions and conditions used to make such determinations. The order contributed to the ongoing Lavender Scare of the mid-1950s, barring thousands of lesbian and gay applicants from government jobs.

== Comparison to the previous Executive Order 9835 ==
Previously, the criteria used to define a security risk were largely political, that is, affiliation with suspect organizations or a clear demonstration of disloyalty. Executive Order 10450 added more general estimations of character, stability, and reliability. Its language was broad: "Any criminal, infamous, dishonest, immoral, or notoriously disgraceful conduct, habitual use of intoxicants to excess, drug addiction, or sexual perversion." At the same time, the executive order's provisions contained advice on evaluating character problems, as in its provision that the medical valuation of a psychological problem should show "due regard to the transient or continuing effect of the illness."

== Ban on lesbian and gay federal workers ==
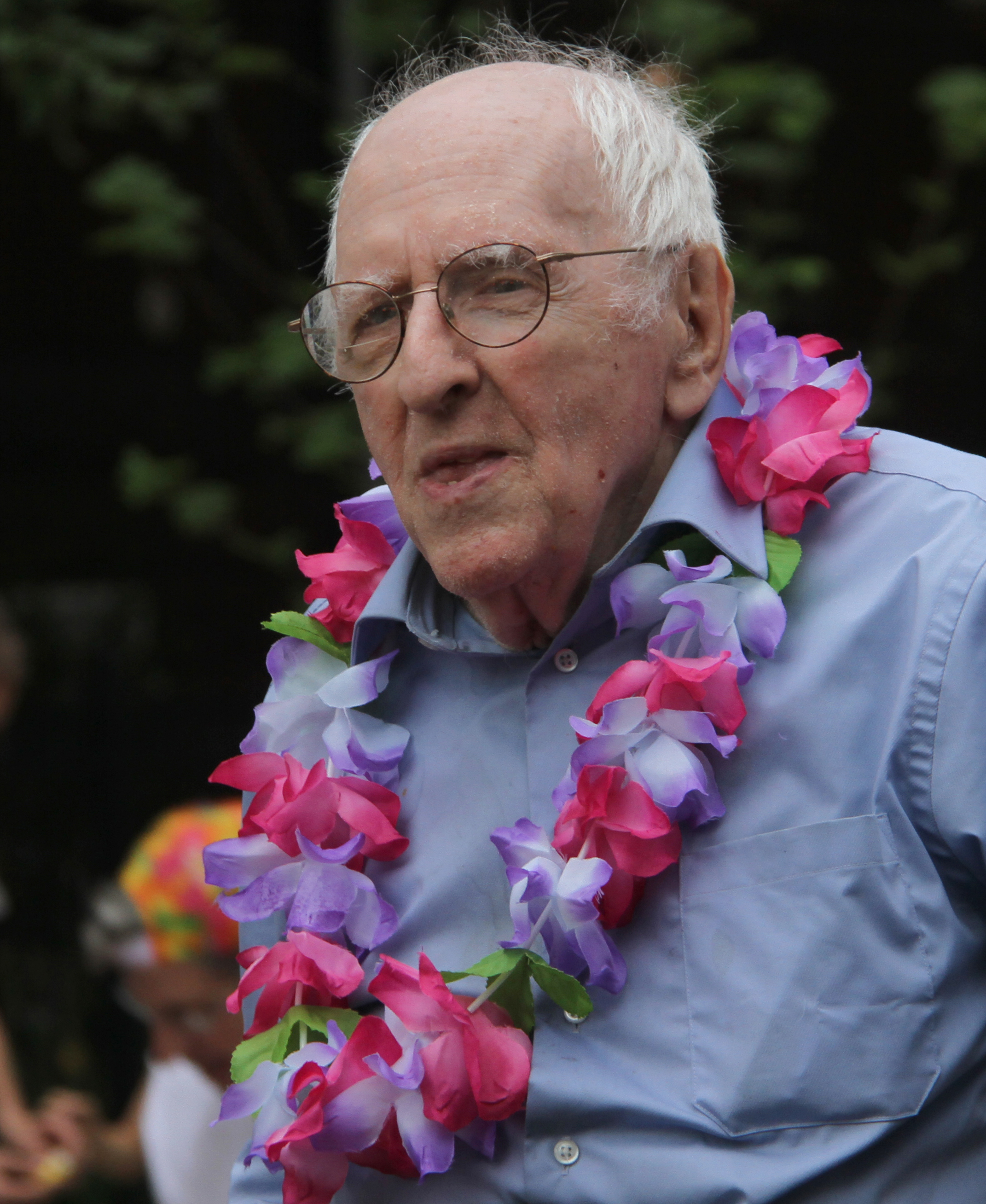
Astronomer Frank Kameny (pictured in 2010) was fired from his government job in 1957 for being gay. He would later sue the government in a case that went to the US Supreme court and would found the gay rights Mattachine Society.

Under the order, thousands of lesbian and gay applicants were barred from federal employment, and over 5,000 federal employees were fired under suspicions of being homosexual. It came as a part of the "Lavender Scare" witch hunts, which contributed to and complemented the McCarthyist Red Scare. From 1947 to 1961, the number of firings based on sexual orientation was far greater than those for membership in the Communist Party. It was not until 1973 that a federal judge ruled that a person's sexual orientation alone could not be the sole reason for termination from federal employment, and not until 1975 that the United States Civil Service Commission announced that they would consider applications by gay and lesbian individuals on a case-by-case basis.

Without explicitly referring to homosexuality, the executive order responded to several years of charges that the presence of homosexual employees in the State Department posed blackmail risks. Attorney General Herbert Brownell Jr. explained that the new order was designed to encompass both loyalty and security risks, and he differentiated between the two: "Employees could be a security risk and still not be disloyal or have any traitorous thoughts, but it may be that their personal habits are such that they might be subject to blackmail by people who seek to destroy the safety of our country." The executive order had the effect of banning gay men and lesbians from working for any agency of the federal government.

== Prior influences on the order's construction ==
The Hoey Committee, an investigative committee created by a Democrat-controlled Senate in 1950, was commissioned to investigate and receive testimony from various federal government agencies, the judiciary, and law enforcement officials in Washington, DC. The purpose of the committee was "to count the number of homosexuals in these departments" and discuss the merits of their inclusion in them. They did not talk to any LGBTQ+ people or groups. The Senate report, entitled Employment of Homosexuals and Other Sex Perverts in Government, found that almost "5000 homosexuals were within the military and civilian work force." The report concluded that gay people should not be allowed in government work because of their susceptibility to seduction and communism, making them a security risk. The report served as a key resource to the Eisenhower administration in the creation of Executive Order 10450. Thus, the Hoey Committee was one of the first steps of institutionalizing homophobia in government work in the United States and served as a guide for future government officials to do the same, as the Eisenhower administration did two years later.

== Other aspects of the order ==
The press recognized the revolutionary nature of the new executive order. The Washington Post said that it established not a loyalty test but a "suitability test." Some in government referred to their new "integrity-security" program. Some of those the press expected to be excluded from federal employment included "a person who drinks too much," "an incorrigible gossip," "homosexuals," and "neurotics."

Truman's earlier Executive Order 9835 applied only to the State Department and select military agencies. Executive Order 10450 extended to all employees of the federal government, notably the armed forces. Anyone enlisting was required to sign a statement swearing that he had no connections with an organization deemed subversive. Joining such an organization at any time during military service was grounds for immediate discharge from the military. According to scholars, since at least as early as 1960, Executive Order 10450 was also applied to ban transgender individuals from serving in the United States military. Due to the difficulty in proving something like an individual's sexuality, accusations of homosexuality were very dangerous to one's career, regardless of their accuracy.

== Repealing the ban on radical sympathizers ==
The U.S. Supreme Court in Cole v. Young (1956) restricted the application of the executive order. In the case of a food and drug inspector for the Department of Health, Education, and Welfare who had been dismissed for his association with radicals, the Court faulted the executive order for its failure to define "national security" and for other ambiguities. It faulted its application in the case of a position not clearly related to national security. It noted conflicts with statutes like the Veterans' Preference Act.

== Repealing the order ==
In 1975, the U.S. Civil Service Commission ended a ban on gay and lesbian individuals in the federal civil service. In 1977, the State Department lifted a policy barring gay individuals from employment in the Foreign Service. Around the same time, the IRS ended its policy of requiring "homosexual education and charity groups to publicly state that homosexuality is a 'sickness, disturbance, or diseased pathology'" before obtaining section 501 tax-exempt status.

The order's language restricting national security access based on sexual orientation was also repealed in 1995 when President Bill Clinton signed Executive Order 12968, which stated that "The United States Government does not discriminate on the basis of race, color, religion, sex, national origin, disability, or sexual orientation in granting access to classified information." The order's language concerning employment and sexual orientation was also repealed when Clinton signed Executive Order 13087 in 1998.

The order was explicitly repealed in 2017, when President Barack Obama signed Executive Order 13764, the last of his administration.

== See also ==
- Executive order (United States)
- Moynihan Commission on Government Secrecy
