= Josh Seefried =

American LGBT rights activist

- Born: February 6, 1986 (age 40); Aurora, Colorado, U.S.
- Education: United States Air Force Academy
- Known for: LGBT rights activism
- Website: www.JoshSeefried.com

Josh Seefried (born February 6, 1986) is an LGBT rights activist, a former captain in the United States Air Force, and a former co-chairman on the Board of Directors of OutServe-SLDN, an association of lesbian, gay, bisexual and transgender members of the U.S. Military. A graduate from the U.S. Air Force Academy in 2009, Josh was formerly known by his pseudonym JD Smith during his campaign to end the discrimination against lesbians, gays and bisexuals serving openly in the United States military.

Using social networking tools such as Facebook, Seefried organized LGBT active-duty military personnel into an underground association OutServe. To preclude outing himself as gay while serving on active duty in the Air Force, a violation of the then- Don't Ask, Don't Tell policy for which he could have been prosecuted and discharged, he assumed the leadership role and interacted with the media and officials in the Pentagon and the White House using only his pseudonym. He has appeared on CNN, HLN, and MSNBC in shadow; additionally, his comments continue to be regularly sought after by the media as a representative of lesbian, gay, and bisexual actively-serving military members. He was also an invited guest to the presidential signing of the legislation to repeal "Don't Ask, Don't Tell."

On October 27, 2012, the two organizations OutServe and SLDN merged. Seefried was voted co-chair of the board of directors, making him the youngest at 26 to co-chair any major LGBT organization. Seefried later resigned from the board of directors and left OutServe-SLDN.

== Bibliography ==
- Seefried, Josh (2011). Don't Ask, Don't Tell. Penguin Press. ISBN 978-1594203312.
