= Crittenden Report =

Government report on homosexuality in the US Navy

The Crittenden Report was the outcome of a 1957 investigation on the part of a United States Navy Board of Inquiry, officially known as the Board Appointed to Prepare and Submit Recommendations to the Secretary of the Navy for the Revision of Policies, Procedures and Directives Dealing With Homosexuals. Navy Captain S.H. Crittenden, Jr., chaired the Board.

== History ==
The Board evaluated Navy policies dealing with homosexual personnel that were based in part on the assertions made in the December 1950 final report of the Investigations Subcommittee of the Senate Committee on Expenditure in Executive Departments, which said that all of the government's intelligence agencies "are in complete agreement that sex perverts in Government constitute security risks." Senator Clyde Hoey, Democrat of North Carolina, chaired the subcommittee that produced the report, sometimes known as the Hoey Report or the Hoey Investigation.

The Crittenden Report, by contrast, concluded that there was "no sound basis for the belief that homosexuals posed a security risk" and criticized the Hoey Report: "No intelligence agency, as far as can be learned, adduced any factual data before that committee with which to support these opinions" and said that "the concept that homosexuals necessarily pose a security risk is unsupported by adequate factual data." According to Allan Bérubé, the report detailed anti-homosexual views in guidelines issued in 1952. These included efforts to characterize homosexuality as a "very bad thing that exists in life but about which the majority of people know little or nothing," and statements that "Homosexuality is wrong, it is evil, and it is to be branded as such" and "is an offense to all decent and law-abiding people, and it is not to be condoned on grounds of 'mental illness' any more than other crimes such as theft, homicide or criminal assault." It advocated anti-homosexual policies on grounds unrelated to national security. Apparently, it was felt "The service should not move ahead of civilian society nor attempt to set substantially different standards in attitude or action with respect to homosexual offenders."

Completed on March 15, 1957, the report entails three main areas of consideration, namely: available knowledge and facts concerning homosexual behavior and treatment; standards and methods used in implementation of military policies and instructions; and recommendations with respect to treatment, investigative procedures, discharges and policies. Noting that only homosexuality is covered by specific directives related to sexual perversion, the Crittenden Board stated at the outset of their report that there may be "an unwarranted emphasis" on homosexuality by military authorities. Further, the board stressed: "Many common misconceptions pertaining to homosexuality have become exaggerated and perpetuated over the years. As additional facts have been gathered in recent years, the fallacies inherent in these concepts are being demonstrated with increasing frequency." (Gibson, p. 357)

The Crittenden Report remained secret until 1976. Navy officials claimed they had no record of studies of homosexuality, but attorneys learned of its existence and obtained it through a Freedom of Information Act request. In September 1981, the Navy was still unable to fulfill a request for the Report's supporting documentation, specifically parts 2 and 3 of the Report, which contain "copies of directives and memoranda regarding homosexual policies, verbatim testimony from Navy officials on the evolution of the World War II wartime antigay policies, and an unidentified 'confidential supplement'."

== See also ==
- Don't ask, don't tell
- Executive Order 10450
- Lavender scare
- McCarthyism
- Wright Commission on Government Security

== Sources ==
- Timothy Haggerty, "History Repeating Itself: A Historical Overview of Gay Men and Lesbians in the Military before 'Don't Ask, Don't Tell'," in Aaron Belkin and Geoffrey Bateman, eds., Don't Ask, Don't Tell: Debating the Gay Ban in the Military (Boulder, CO: Lynne Rienner, 2003)
- Allan Bérubé, Coming out under fire: the history of gay men and women in World War Two (NY: Free Press, 1990)
- E. Lawrence Gibson, Get Off my Ship : Ensign Berg vs. the U.S. Navy (NY: Avon, 1978)
- David K. Johnson, The Lavender Scare: The Cold War Persecution of Gays and Lesbians in the Federal Government (University of Chicago Press, 2004)
- Jennifer Terry, An American Obsession: Science, Medicine, and Homosexuality in Modern Society (University of Chicago Press, 1999)
