= Keith Meinhold =

- Born: 1963 (age 62–63)
- Known for: One of the first openly gay United States Navy service members to be honorably discharged

Keith Meinhold (born c. 1963) is an American former Navy first class petty officer. He is a veteran of the US Navy who successfully challenged the Navy's attempt to discharge him for coming out as gay in 1992. Petty Officer Meinhold was represented by detailed military defense counsel, Matthew G. Gloss, LT, JAGC, USNR. Keith retired from the Navy in 1996, one of the first openly gay U.S. service members to be honorably discharged.

== Early career ==
Volker Keith Meinhold grew up in Stuart, Florida. On April 10, 1980, at the age of 17, rather than repeat the 11th grade at Martin County High School, he enlisted in the U.S. Navy. He realized he was gay after enlisting and came out to his family in 1990 at Christmas.

During his first decade of service in the Navy, Meinhold received merit promotions and was commended in his performance evaluations for "outstanding job performance," "positive influence on squadron morale," and "excellent rapport with both seniors and his peers." He left the Navy in July 1985 and re-enlisted in October 1985. He worked as a flight sonar analyst and instructor at Moffett Field Naval Air Station, near San Jose, California, where, according to later court filings, he was "consistently praised by students for his teaching abilities." Meinhold flew missions throughout the Pacific and Indian Ocean and the Persian Gulf.

He supervised a team of 32 Navy instructors and was recognized as "Aircrew Instructor of the Year". In September 1991, he was awarded the title "Master Training Specialist", an honor granted to those rated in the top ten percent of all Navy instructors.

Meinhold worked with a group that helped gays being discharged from the Navy find employment. They were overwhelmed by anti-homosexual campaigns–he called them "witch hunts"–on certain ships, the USS Blue Ridge (LCC-19) and USS Independence (CV-62). He contacted the Human Rights Campaign about the problem and they arranged for him to speak with the media about the witch hunts and about being gay in the Navy. On May 19, 1992, he declared his homosexuality in an interview on the ABC News program World News Tonight when he told a television interviewer: "Yes, in fact, I am gay."

== Discharge proceedings ==
On the basis of that statement, the Navy convened a discharge board to consider his case. Several officers testified on his behalf and one apologized for any inadvertent prejudice and said he had changed his opinion about homosexuals as a result of knowing Meinhold. The Navy decided to discharge Meinhold on June 30, and he was separated from the Navy on August 12, 1992.

Meinhold sued in federal court contending that his discharge had violated the Constitution's equal protection guarantee and that the Navy board had acted unfairly by refusing to tell him at his discharge hearing whether he was being judged for acknowledging his homosexuality or for engaging in homosexual acts, something he consistently denied. On November 7, 1992, U.S. District Court Judge Terry J. Hatter, Jr. issued a temporary injunction against the Navy and ordered Meinhold reinstated.

Meinhold returned to work, where many of his colleagues had known he was gay before his television appearance. He told reporters that "Some people have asked to be excused from performing military duties because of religious objections–that homosexuality is wrong." Their commander officers excused them from working alongside him. "I think that was wrong," Meinhold said.

On November 12, President-elect Bill Clinton, in response to a reporter's question at his first post-election press conference about the injunction in Meinhold's case, reaffirmed his commitment to lift restrictions on military service by gays and lesbians early in his presidency.

Hatter made the injunction permanent when he issued his decision in the case on January 28, 1993. He wrote that Meinhold's discharge violated the Constitution's guarantee of equal protection and that a discharge was unjustifiable "in the absence of sexual conduct which interferes with the military mission." He wrote: "Gays and lesbians have served, and continue to serve, the United States military with honor, pride, dignity and loyalty. The Department of Defense's justifications for its policy banning gays and lesbians from military service are based on cultural myths and false stereotypes. These justifications are baseless and very similar to the reasons offered to keep the military racially segregated in the 1940s." Hatter cited a study commissioned by the Defense Department in 1988 that found that sexual orientation was not related to job performance and quoted Lawrence J. Korb, an Assistant Secretary of Defense in the Reagan administration, who had said "there is no longer any justification for the armed services' current ban on homosexuals serving in the military."

On January 29, Clinton reached an agreement with Senate leaders, led by Sen. Sam Nunn, chairman of the Senate Armed Forces Committee, to delay until July any changes in policies with respect to military service by gays and lesbians. At a joint news conference with Nunn, Clinton praised Judge Hatter's ruling, which he said had strengthened his hand in the negotiations: "It makes the practical point I have been making all along." Meinhold appeared on the February 1 cover of Newsweek that carried the headline "Gays and the Military".

Meinhold assessed his work environment following Hatter's decision: "Some people are openly supportive, others give closet support and others, by their vibes alone, are not happy with my return".

On March 12, 1993, lawyers for the Department of Defense failed to get an emergency stay of Hatter's order from the U.S. Court of Appeals for the Ninth Circuit. The court noted that Clinton had issued a directive on January 29 that precluded discharges for homosexuality and directed instead that homosexual military personnel be transferred to standby reserve, which did not conflict with Hatter's injunction.

As part of the appeals process, Capt. Gregory Markwell, Meinhold's commander, provided in a sworn statement his negative assessment of the impact Meinhold's presence was having. As the national debate about modifying the rules banning gays and lesbians from the Armed Forces continued, Navy officials opposed to changing the policy made legislators aware of Markwell's statement and two Congressional committees requested it and made it public. Markwell's declaration described how work schedules were being modified to accommodate those who did not want to work with Meinhold and said that his reinstatement had "reduced morale, efficiency and mission focus" and "struck a discordant note with the troops."

In the weeks that followed, Meinhold testified before the House Armed Services Committee and then the Senate Armed Services Committee.

On August 31, 1994, a three-judge panel of the Ninth Circuit ruled unanimously that the Navy could not discharge Petty Officer Meinhold merely because he said he is gay. The court wrote: "a military service cannot discharge a service member solely because of a statement of sexual orientation devoid of a concrete, expressed desire to act on his homosexual propensity", distinguishing between declaration of sex orientation and the military's judgment of "conduct". It noted that "No similar assumption is made with respect to service members who are heterosexual" unless they are guilty of such prohibited conduct as adultery, sodomy or bigamy. Meinhold's lawyers saw this analysis as a direct attack on the assumptions behind the proposed "Don't ask, don't tell" (DADT) policy, then under consideration. One commented: "This decision says it is improper for the Government to make a presumption that a person who says he or she is gay will conduct himself or herself in prohibited conduct. That presumption is the linchpin for the Clinton Administration policy." The court read the Navy's regulation "to mandate separation due to a statement of homosexuality only when that statement itself indicates more than the inchoate 'desire' or 'propensity' that inheres in status", not when a statement "manifests no concrete, expressed desire to commit homosexual acts".

The Department of Defense did not appeal the decision, since it related to old regulations that had now been replaced by DADT, and the administration had won a different case, that of Joseph Steffan, a week earlier. Meinhold, now working at Naval Air Station at Whidbey Island in Washington, was warned that under DADT, if he repeated the same statement that had prompted the Navy's discharge proceedings, he would be discharged. His attorney commented: "He was told by the executive officer of his squadron that he has a clean slate, and that he would be permitted to remain, but that if he says he's gay again, then they would be taking action against him under the new policy. It's ridiculous. They live with a known homosexual so long as he doesn't show how gay he is. It shows how symbolic the policy really is."

== Later career ==
In July 1995, Hatter ordered the government to pay Meinhold $440,000 in court costs. The government appealed and the Ninth circuit again found for Meinhold, on February 4, 1997.

In his final Navy tour, Meinhold was recognized for photographic intelligence quality with two Lens Master and one Golden Lens awards. His crew was honored as the most combat effective P-3 crew in the Pacific Fleet as both the "Crew of the Quarter" and "Crew of the Year". Meinhold left active duty after 16 years of service in March 1996 and was awarded the Navy Achievement Medal.

In 1999, asked if he blamed DADT for the murder of Pfc. Barry Winchell by a fellow soldier, Meinhold told CBS News: "Absolutely. Not just the policy, but the lack of proper implementation of the policy is responsible for his death. I think what has happened out of the policy is that the Pentagon has perpetuated this anti-gay sentiment and hasn't done anything to prevent this."

He lives in Florida with his partner Steven Weiss. He works in marketing and graphic design for an ocean sciences firm.

== See also ==
- Sexual orientation and the United States military
