= Allen Irvin Bernstein =

United States Army soldier

Allen Irvin Bernstein (June 19, 1913 – September 8, 2008) was a gay Jewish American World War II veteran who in 1940 wrote a defense of homosexuality entitled Millions of Queers (Our Homo America), a 149-page unpublished typescript that was discovered in the National Library of Medicine in 2010 by Randall L. Sell, associate professor at Drexel University School of Public Health, and was published online at OutHistory in March 2014. The essay is notable for its argument that homosexuals should not be stigmatized or condemned by society, at a time when homosexual acts were crimes in all parts the country. It also provides insight into gay life and relationships in the United States during the 1930s and before, based on what Bernstein learned from his gay friends and acquaintances as well as on his wide reading and research in literary and sociological sources.

LGBT historian and author Jonathan Ned Katz calls the extended essay "a rich document of homosexual American history" and notes that "as a sociological, anthropological, and historical survey and personal polemic, [it] anticipates and most resembles a book published eleven years after it: The Homosexual in America: A Subjective Approach (1951), by the married sociologist Edward Sagarin, using the pseudonym Donald Webster Cory. Like Sagarin, Bernstein accepted many of the negative clichés about homosexuals, but argued that they should not be persecuted under the law."

== Personal life ==
Bernstein was born in Nashua, New Hampshire, to Joseph and Rose Simon Bernstein, both of East European Jewish descent. Bernstein grew up in Salem, Massachusetts, where he graduated from high school. After Rose died in 1928 and Joseph in 1929, Bernstein and his older brother Haskell were adopted by an aunt and uncle in Albany, New York.

Bernstein attended Tufts College for one year, then transferred to Union College, from which he graduated in 1933. He then spent a year at the University of Chicago, graduating with a master's degree in history in 1934. Bernstein was unable to find permanent work during the Depression, and went through a succession of temporary jobs. In January 1938, he was hired to write on history and architecture for the Federal Writers' Project guidebook to the state of Massachusetts, a job he held for the statutory maximum of 18 months.

In September 1940, Bernstein enlisted in the United States Army, initially being stationed in Staten Island, New York, and then was assigned to write training manuals for the Quartermaster Corps in Camp Lee, Virginia, with the rank of staff sergeant, and was eventually awarded a Good Conduct Medal. In January 1944, following an attempt to pick up a fellow soldier after attending a performance of the Ballets Russes in Richmond, Virginia, Bernstein was arrested by military police and summarily jailed, and then transferred to a psychiatric ward on base, pending his less-than-honorable blue discharge for homosexuality four weeks later.

After his discharge, Bernstein eventually took a job teaching at New England College in Henniker, New Hampshire, and later worked as a labor market analyst for the Maine Department of Labor, settling in Augusta, Maine, a job from which he retired in 1978. In 1946, Bernstein married Anne Fine, and subsequently had two sons, Gerald and Robert. Bernstein came out to his fiancée when he proposed to her, as he described in a 2003 interview:

I met this nice middle-class Jewish girl from the Boston area, through one of the Nashua, New Hampshire cousins, and we clicked. It was terrific. We were both products of the 30s, in our own early 30s. Quote, "I'm gay. Will you marry me?" "Yes."

Although Congress scrapped the blue discharges in 1947, veterans who had received them were still ineligible for any G. I. Bill benefits or assistance from the Veterans Administration. Beginning in March 1944, Bernstein began a series of appeals of his blue discharge, doggedly refiling his appeals after repeated rebuffs from the Army, until he was finally granted a retroactive honorable discharge in 1981.

After Anne's death in 1991, Bernstein came out to his sons and for the next two decades was an active volunteer in numerous service organizations and gay-rights groups, including the Red Cross, American Veterans for Equal Rights, and the Maine Lesbian/Gay Political Alliance (now EqualityMaine), among others.

In 1948, Bernstein had begun work at Harvard on a doctoral degree in education, but when university officials questioned his blue discharge and he told them it was for homosexuality, he was asked to leave the program. Not long before his death in 2008, Bernstein told his sons that he had willed his brain to Harvard Medical School, saying "If I could not get into Harvard when I was alive, at least my brain will get in."

== Writings ==
Except as noted, all were unpublished during Bernstein's lifetime:

- "A Pervert Talks Back" (1938)
- "They Didn't Mean Us" (1938)
- Millions of Queers (Our Homo America) (1940)
- Poems Partly Pederastic (1941) – a collection of 13 poems self-published by Bernstein
- "My Blue Sec. 8 Discharge" (1944) – submitted as an open letter to Common Sense in 1944, but not accepted for publication
- Letter to the Adjunct General of the U.S. Army, now in the archives of Common Sense at Yale University (1944)
- Letter to the editor published in the Portland, Maine, Press Herald (1993)

Published interviews:

- with Mary Ann Humphrey, published in her book My Country, My Right To Serve (1990)
- with Joan Radner for the Library of Congress, Veterans History Project (2002)
