= Joseph Steffan =

American lawyer

- Born: July 29, 1964 (age 62); Warren, Minnesota, United States
- Education: U.S. Naval Academy
- Occupation: Lawyer

Joseph Charles Steffan (born July 29, 1964) is an American lawyer and gay activist. He was expelled from the U.S. Naval Academy in Annapolis in 1987 shortly before graduation after disclosing his homosexuality. He sued the U.S. Department of Defense, claiming that his oral avowal of homosexuality could not be construed as an indication that he ever had or intended to engage in sexual relations with another man. He lost a protracted court battle for reinstatement in 1994.

== Early years ==
Joseph Steffan was born on July 29, 1964, in Warren, Minnesota, to a family of Scandinavian stock. He was raised a Roman Catholic and was a choir boy. He was inducted into the U.S. Naval Academy in Annapolis in July 1983. He determined he was gay during his second year there. In his First Class (senior) year he was promoted to a battalion commander, placing him in command of one-sixth of the academy's 4,500 midshipmen and among the top ten highest-ranking midshipmen in the academy. He twice sang "The Star-Spangled Banner" at Army–Navy games. After he told another midshipman and a chaplain that he was homosexual, the academy conducted an investigation and Steffan told a disciplinary board that he was homosexual. The board then changed his performance evaluation from "A" to "F" and recommended that he be discharged. He was expelled from the academy six weeks before graduation. He never admitted, nor was he was accused of, engaging in sex with another man. In a letter to the New York Times dated August 23, 1988, he wrote: "the real problem is not homosexuality, but rather, the military's open and officially supported prejudice against homosexuals who have the desire and capability to serve their country."

== Lawsuit ==
=== District Court ===
On December 29, 1988, Steffan, represented by the Lambda Legal Defense and Education Fund, filed suit in United States District Court for the District of Columbia asking it to order the Department of Defense to reinstate him. He claimed his equal protection and due process rights had been violated. At the time, he was working in Fargo, North Dakota, for a computer software company.

When his deposition was taken, Steffan refused to respond to questions about whether he had ever "engaged in homosexual acts" as defined by the Navy: "Bodily contact actively undertaken or passively permitted between members of the same sex for the purpose of satisfying sexual desires." He also refused to discuss other aspects of his behavior, including why he had himself tested several times for HIV. Based on that refusal, U.S. District Judge Oliver Gasch dismissed the suit on November 15, 1989.

A panel of the United States Court of Appeals for the District of Columbia Circuit reversed Gasch on December 7, 1990. Its decision said: "That [Steffen] seeks reinstatement as relief for an allegedly invalid separation does not put into issue the question whether he engaged in potentially disqualifying conduct unless such conduct was a basis for his separation."

During a hearing on March 5, 1991, Gasch used the term "homo" several times to refer to Steffan or to homosexuals generally. On March 11, 1991, Steffan's attorneys asked Gasch to disqualify himself based on the prejudice evidenced by his language. In April, Gasch refused to disqualify himself.

On December 9, 1991, Gasch ruled in favor of the Department of Defense in the case of Steffan v. Cheney. His decision held that the government's exclusion of homosexuals from the Armed Forces "is rational in that it is directed, in part, at preventing those who are at the greatest risk of dying of AIDS from serving. This is understandable in light of the overall mission of defending the nation. The interest we as a Nation have in a healthy military cannot be underestimated." Neither party to the case had mentioned AIDS in its briefs. At the time, the U.S. military denied enlistment to applicants who tested positive for HIV and gave medical discharges to servicemembers who became infected with HIV only when they could no longer perform their assigned duties. According to the New York Times, "As of September, 1,888 members of the military who had tested positive for the virus were still on duty." Gasch also found the policy reflected "The quite rational assumption in the Navy ... that with no one present who has a homosexual orientation, men and women alike can undress, sleep, bathe and use the bathroom without fear or embarrassment that they are being viewed as sexual objects."

=== Court of Appeals ===
On Inauguration Day, January 20, 1993, Steffan sang the national anthem at the Triangle Ball, a gala for homosexuals celebrating the beginning of Bill Clinton's presidency.

While awaiting the resolution of his lawsuit, Steffan finished college at North Dakota State University and entered the University of Connecticut School of Law.

On October 6, 1992, while serving as co-chairman of the Gay and Lesbian Law Students Association there, he and other students, with the support of the law school dean and represented by the American Civil Liberties Union, asked a Connecticut state court to ban military recruiting on their campus because the military's ban on service by gays and lesbians violated the state statute that banned discrimination based on sexual orientation. He told a reporter that given his experience in the Navy having military recruiters on campus was "like someone kicking you in the stomach."

In late 1992, Steffan published his autobiography, Honor Bound. Herbert Mitgang wrote that "What makes the book particularly readable is his account of discovering his homosexuality." Steffan began his third year of law school in the fall of 1993.

In a newspaper profile that appeared in February 1993, Steffan carefully edited his statements to avoid affecting his lawsuit: "Because he is afraid of undercutting his lawsuit against the Government ... he portrays himself as purer than pure, refusing even to answer whether he has a boyfriend. His replies are careful, a mix of natural Midwestern reserve and lobbyist's savvy." He offered opinions of a general nature–"Heterosexual men have an annoying habit of overestimating their own attractiveness."–and described his mood as the debate about gays in the military had become a political issue: "I'm discouraged. In terms of the tenor of the debate, we've lost ground. I've come to appreciate the power of hatred. We're being portrayed as inherently immoral disease carriers unable to control their sexuality. I think people realize it's wrong to kick gay people out of the military. But they have been made afraid." As for the military: "I think what's going on in the military is denial and perpetuating the myth that the military is the last bastion of white male heterosexuality.... This male arrogant elitism that the military is an institution for a few, for one small segment of our society."

The Appeals Court panel heard arguments on September 13, 1993. The court's questioning revolved around the Navy's apparent punishment of speech and its regulation of behavior outside the military's jurisdiction. Judges asked hypothetical questions about a servicemember who was celibate or promised not to engage in homosexual sex while in the military, or one who only engaged in such acts off-base with a civilian in a jurisdiction where such behavior was not criminalized. The government's attorney argued that allowing such instances would require the military to condone that behavior and that the root of the military's policy was "Good order, discipline and order, and unit cohesion."

In November 1993, a three-judge panel of the Court of Appeals reversed the District Court decision and found in Steffan's favor. The court ordered the Navy to commission the dismissed Steffan as a Navy officer and grant him his Naval Academy diploma. The court said that the military's new policy on military service by open gays and lesbians, "Don't ask, don't tell" (DADT), was not under review, yet the court held that the equal protection guarantee of the Fifth Amendment did not permit the Government to remove members of the armed services merely because they say they are homosexuals, a holding that directly contradicted DADT. In the decision in the case, now called Steffan v. Aspin, Judge Abner J. Mikva wrote:

A cardinal principle of equal protection law holds that the Government cannot discriminate against a certain class in order to give effect to the prejudice of others. Even if the Government does not itself act out of prejudice, it cannot discriminate in an effort to avoid the effects of others' prejudice. Such discrimination plays directly into the hands of the bigots; it ratifies and encourages their prejudice.

Constitutional principles mandate that Government may not disadvantage a person on the basis of his status or his views solely for fear that others may be offended or angered by them. That is precisely the substance of the Secretary's argument in this case: that heterosexual service members and potential recruits will be offended by the presence of homosexuals, and this will affect their morale, discipline and enlistment. The Constitution does not allow Government to subordinate a class of persons simply because others do not like them.

The decision was the second time a Federal appeals court had ruled that as a matter of constitutional law, the military could not exclude someone on the basis of sexual orientation.

Government attorneys debated how to proceed, given the narrowness of the decision and uncertainty about its application to the military's new DADT policy, which had replaced the rules under which Steffan had been discharged. The government decided to appeal on technical grounds. Since the Court of Appeals had ordered that Steffan be awarded his commission, they proposed to argue that, since only the President can award a commission with the consent of the Senate, the court's order violated the principle of separation of powers. In January 1994, however, the Appeals Court suspended the panel's order in Steffan's favor and rejected the government's request that it limit its review to the separation of powers question and refrain from considering the policy's constitutionality.

The case was argued before the full Court of Appeals on May 11, 1994. In August 1994, Steffan began a clerkship with a Federal judge in New Jersey.

The Court of Appeals for the D.C. Circuit handed down a 7–3 decision on Nov. 22, 1994. The majority seven justices, all appointed by Presidents Reagan or Bush, found for the government. Three judges appointed by Presidents Carter or Clinton dissented. Writing for the majority, Judge Laurence H. Silberman found Steffan's position "more clever than real" and said that "Steffan's claim that the Government cannot rationally infer that one who states he or she is a homosexual is a practicing homosexual, or is at least likely to engage in homosexual acts, is so strained a constitutional argument as to amount to a basic attack on the policy itself." Judge Patricia Wald, writing for the minority, said:

For the Government to penalize a person for acknowledging his sexual orientation runs deeply against our constitutional grain. It has, we believe, no precedent or place in our national traditions, which spring from a profound respect for the freedom to think and to be what one chooses and to announce it to the world. The majority's ingenious plays on presumptions and inferences cannot disguise the injustice that lies at the heart of this case. In years to come, we will look back with dismay at these unconstitutional attempts to enforce silence upon individuals of homosexual orientation, in the military and out. Pragmatism should not be allowed to trump principle, or the soul of a nation will wither.

The decision conflicted with a holding by another federal appeals court in August 1994 that ordered the reinstatement of Petty Officer Keith Meinhold, who had outed himself on national television.

One legal analysis of the case suggested that advocates of LGBT rights needed to develop arguments other than the "contortion" of the distinction between status and conduct used by Steffan's attorneys.

At the beginning of 1995, Steffan declined to appeal the decision to the U.S. Supreme Court.

== Later years ==
Steffan and his fellow students eventually won the lawsuit they had brought to deny military recruiters access to their Connecticut Law School. Under federal government's Solomon Amendment, the state was facing the loss of $70 million in grants and student aid. In October 1997, the Connecticut Legislature voted to allow the recruiters on campus. Steffan said he was not surprised and commented: "As a newly minted realist, I recognize that idealism has a price." Of his long legal battles he said: "It's been very much an ebb and flow of positive and disappointing experiences. I realize now that this is a very long-term battle. Social values do not change rapidly, and political change comes about even more slowly."

Steffan is a lawyer in New York City.

He donated his papers related to his suit for reinstatement in the Navy to the University of Connecticut Law School archives.

== See also ==
- Sexual orientation and the United States military

== Sources ==
- Randy Shilts, Conduct Unbecoming: Gays & Lesbians in the U.S. Military (Ballantine, 1993)
- Marc Wolinsky & Kenneth Sherrill, eds., Gays and the Military: Joseph Steffan versus the United States (Princeton University Press, 1993)
