= OutServe-SLDN =

Non-profit organisation in the USA

- Formation: July 2, 2012 (merged)
- Headquarters: Washington, D.C.
- Location: Worldwide
- Members: >7,000
- Executive Director: Andy Blevins
- Website: www.OutServe-SLDN.org

OutServe-SLDN was a network of LGBTQ military personnel, formed as a result of the merger between OutServe and the Servicemembers Legal Defense Network. OutServe-SLDN was one of the largest LGBT employee resource groups in the world. OutServe was founded by a 2009 graduate of the US Air Force Academy, Josh Seefried (also known as JD Smith to protect his identity) and Ty Walrod. There were over 7,000 members and 80 chapters worldwide.

On July 2, 2012, OutServe announced that it would merge with Servicemembers Legal Defense Network, an organization that advocates on behalf of and provides legal services to gay and lesbian military personnel and veterans, in October 2012. On October 25, 2012, Allyson Robinson was the first executive director of OutServe-SLDN following the merger of those two organizations. She was the first transgender person to ever lead a national LGBT rights organization that does not have an explicit transgender focus.

As part of an extensive reorganization and a review of the organization's mission and finances, which included some public airing of internal dissension and inability to fund its current operations, Josh Seefried resigned from the Board on July 8, 2013 Less than nine months after hiring Robinson, OutServe-SLDN's board announced it was bankrupt and had to close its Washington D.C. headquarters; on the same day, Robinson announced that her resignation as executive director would take effect the following day, July 12, 2013. The board announced that for at least a year it plans to focus on the financial crisis and the payment of debts, followed by an eventual return to providing "advocacy, development, or other support." Since that time, OutServe-SLDN continued to actively serve its over 7,000 members and in early 2014 engaged with the Tenth Circuit Court of Appeals regarding Marriage Equality Cases in Oklahoma and Utah.

In May 2019, OutServe-SLDN merged with the American Military Partner Association (AMPA) to form the Modern Military Association of America (MMAA), a united voice for the LGBTQ military and veteran community. MMAA continues the missions of both OutServe-SLDN and AMPA through education, advocacy, and support for LGBTQ service members, veterans, military spouses, family members and allies.

== Leadership ==
Former OutServe logo prior to 2012 design change.

Allyson Robinson was the first executive director of OutServe-SLDN, following the merger of those two organizations. She was the first transgender person to ever lead a national LGBT rights organization that does not have an explicit transgender focus.

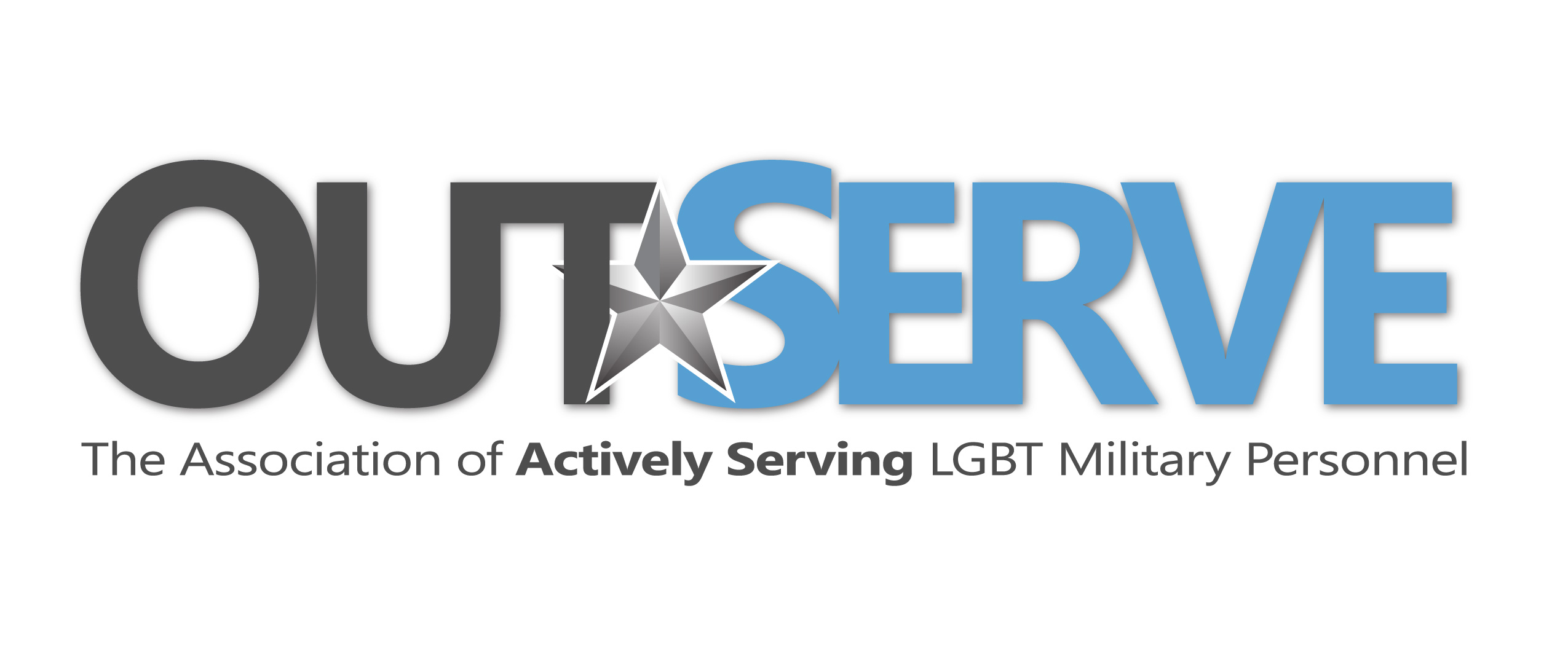
Logo of OutServe (2012)

There are leaders for each of the 80+ chapters worldwide, whose identities, as well as those of all members, were kept anonymous under DADT. With the expiration of DADT on September 20, 2011, JD Smith revealed his true identity. One hundred and one OutServe members in total came out publicly with the end of DADT.

== Membership ==
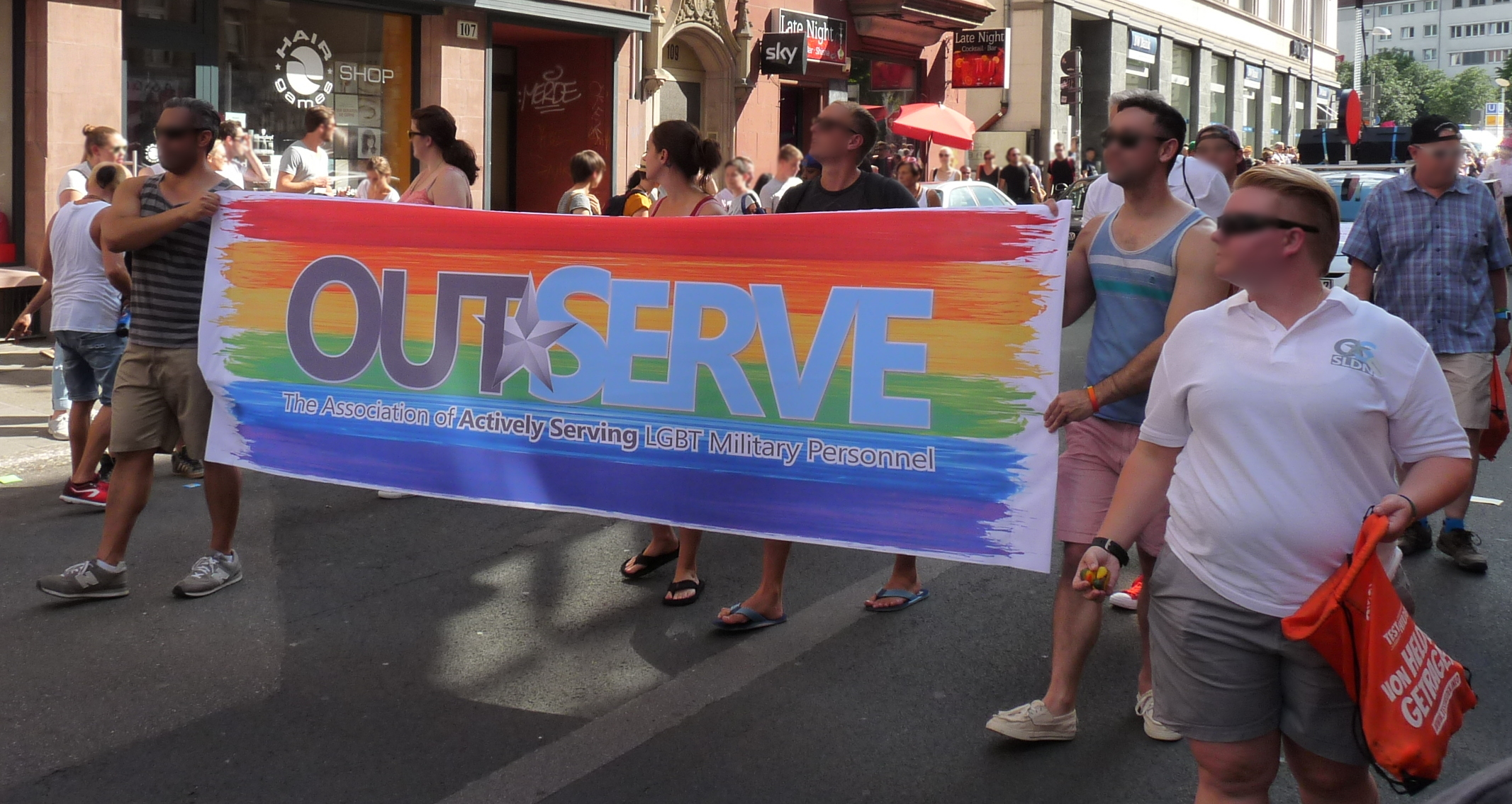
OutServe members taking part in Stuttgart's Pride March in 2016 (Germany).

As of April 2011, OutServe was divided into 42 regional chapters, with a total membership of over 5,000 members. It included personnel from the Army, Air Force, Navy, Marines and Coast Guard, both commissioned officers and enlisted. Due to privacy concerns, OutServe's Membership was closely guarded and monitored. Each chapter has an internally selected leader. Several chapters have hosted meetings and social gatherings aimed at improving the morale and quality of life of the members. The structure of OutServe was inspired by the British military's Proud2Serve organization. As of 2014, OutServe has continued to grow and now has a total membership of over 7,000 members in 80+ chapters worldwide.

== General ==
In June 2010, OutServe sent a letter criticizing the Comprehensive Review Working Group's initial decision to exclude gay and lesbian military personnel from the DADT review process.

On July 26, 2010, OutServe was falsely accused of claiming to be the first organization to directly represent active-duty service members, specifically. Walrod said that OutServe was not interested in claiming credit for the work of other organizations and only aimed to give a voice to personnel silenced by the DADT policy.

At the end of August 2011, the DOD approved the distribution of OutServe Magazine at Army and Air Force base exchanges beginning with the September 20 issue, coinciding with the end of DADT.

== OutServe Magazine ==
OutServe Magazine, co-founded by Air Force Staff Sgt. Jonathan Mills and Capt Edward Sweeney, was a bi-monthly periodical digital and print publication of OutServe, a non-profit, non-government organization for lesbian, gay, bisexual and transgender service members in the United States Armed Forces. It was first published online in March 2011, while OutServe was still operating clandestinely prior to the repeal of the "Don't Ask, Don't Tell" policy that banned open gays from service. The Magazine was later printed and distributed to military bases, the first magazine of its kind to receive DoD approval for distribution, beginning the day of the implementation of DADT repeal. The publication was distributed free of charge to the military, and was available to the public for downloading and redistribution through its website and mobile apps. The Magazine published its final issue in June 2013, one month before the resignation of key OutServe-SLDN leaders. The Magazine's archived issues can be found at MagCloud.

== SLDN ==
Servicemembers Legal Defense Network (SLDN) was founded as a non-profit legal services, watchdog, and policy organization founded in the United States in 1993. It was dedicated to ending discrimination and harassment of gay and lesbian U.S. military personnel negatively affected by the "Don't ask, don't tell" (DADT) policy which was established that same year. Before being merged into OutServe-SLDN, SLDN documented over 700 violations in the policy's first two years of operation. As of January 2011, it provided legal aid to more than 10,000 service members.

=== Lawsuits ===
In June 2008, the United States Court of Appeals for the First Circuit ruled against SLDN in Cook v. Gates, in which SLDN's twelve clients sought reinstatement in the military after being discharged under DADT.

On October 27, 2011, SLDN sued the Department of Defense, challenging Section 3 of the Defense of Marriage Act (DOMA) and two statutes that detail military benefits. In a November 21 filing, SLDN argued:

Any claim that DOMA, as applied to military spousal benefits, survives rational basis review is strained because paying unequal benefits to service members runs directly counter to the military values of uniformity, fairness and unit cohesion. While there was once a debate as to whether gay and lesbian service members should be allowed to serve openly in the armed forces -- just as there were similar debates regarding integrating the military by race and then by gender -- there never has been any debate as to whether similarly situated service members who do the same work deserve the same benefits.

The case, McLaughlin v. Panetta, was put on hold at the request of both sides in anticipation of the outcome of two other First Circuit cases that were being appealed, Gill v. Office of Personnel Management and Massachusetts v. United States Department of Health and Human Services. On February 17, 2012, the DOJ announced it could not defend the constitutionality of the statutes challenged in the case. The Bipartisan Legal Advisory Group (BLAG) of the U.S. House of Representatives sought to undertake the defense, and as of May 2012, the parties were disputing BLAG's right to intervene.

== See also ==
- USNA Out
- Servicemembers United
- OutServe Magazine
- The American Military Partner Association
