= Jean-François Gariépy =

Canadian neuroscientist and far-right political commentator

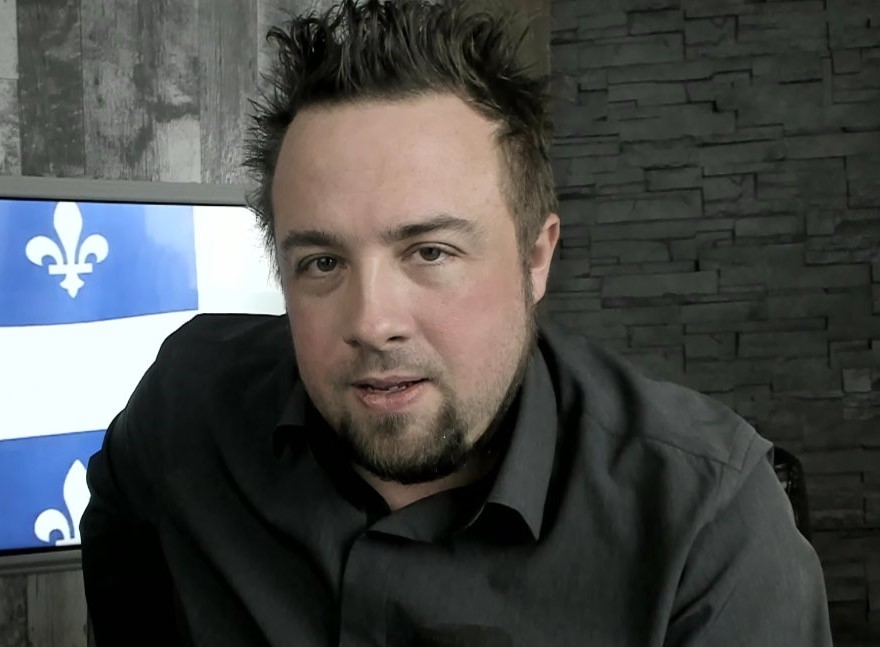
- Gariépy in January 2020
- Born: Québec, Canada
- Education: PhD
- Occupations: YouTube personality; author

YouTube information
- Channel: JFG Tonight
- Years active: 2011–present
- Genre: Political commentary
- Subscribers: 9.53 thousand
- Views: 210 thousand
- Gariépy's voice
- Last updated: 25 April 2026
- Website: jfg.world

Jean-François Gariépy (French pronunciation: [ʒɑ̃.fʁɑ̃.swa ɡaʁ.je.pi]) is a Canadian white supremacist, former neuroscience researcher, and alt-right political commentator. Gariépy hosted the YouTube channel The Public Space before launching his current channel JFG Tonight where he calls for the creation of a white ethnostate, promotes antisemitic messages, and advocates for the genetic superiority of white people. The Anti-Defamation League lists The Public Space among "White Supremacist Channels". Gariépy has been described as a "standard bearer of the alt-right."

== Early life ==
Gariépy was raised in Saint-Sophie in Quebec. Gariépy studied biology at the Université de Montreal. In 2008, the Society for Neuroscience awarded Gariépy the Next Generation Award. In 2012, he finished a doctoral thesis in French about the neural networks involved in the respiratory rhythm in lampreys. From September 2011 until September 2015, Gariépy studied social interactions in monkeys at the Institute for Brain Sciences at Duke University. Over his scientific career, Gariépy published 13 research papers that have been cited 943 times.

Gariépy was not asked to return to his postdoctoral position. At this time, Gariépy was in a relationship with one of his undergraduate lab assistants. Gariépy told The Daily Beast he left Duke University for Canada because "he'd grown disillusioned with the scientific community." In a Facebook post, Gariépy said he was leaving academia because it was "defective" and was interfering with "a true search for knowledge". He said he would continue to search for "a better way" to satisfy his scientific curiosity. As of 2018, he had moved back to Canada following changes to his legal immigration status related to his divorce from his third wife.

== Political commentator ==
Gariépy made his first public appearance on episode 76 of the podcast Drunken Peasants in 2015. In 2017, Gariépy joined the YouTube channel Warski Live as co-host. At Warski Live, Gariépy introduced topics like scientific racism by discussing ethnic differences with guests like Richard B. Spencer, Millennial Woes, Andrew Anglin and Sargon of Akkad. At Warski Live, Gariépy gained notoriety among the alt-right as a moderator of the so-called "YouTube Bloodsports" where two or more mainly right-wing guests engage in often highly abusive discussions on politics.

After a falling out with his co-host, Andy Warski, in April 2018, Gariépy founded his own YouTube channel "The Public Space". The channel has, among many others, featured white nationalists and alt-right figures like Richard B. Spencer, David Duke, Mike Peinovich, Nick Fuentes, Greg Johnson, in addition to anti-transgender activist Posie Parker.

== Personal life ==
Gariépy has been married and divorced three times. His first marriage occurred when he was 18, and lasted five years.

In 2018, following his third divorce, Gariépy was the defendant in a guardianship lawsuit over a 19-year-old he was claiming as his fiancée. A doctor said this woman had autism and "the social and mental maturity of a 10 or 11-year-old child." Gariépy had made contact with the woman online before she decided to travel to North Carolina to see him in July 2016. According to the woman, Gariépy intended to impregnate her. The parents of the teenager won guardianship and returned her home.

In June 2023, Gariépy's partner Élora Patoine (also known as "Mama JF") disappeared, having last been seen in Moncton on June 19, two days after being left at a gas station. Gariépy subsequently announced a deep cleaning of his house. He believed that she left voluntarily (as an act of off-the-grid living) in explaining why he never reported her absence to police. In September/October 2023, she was reported missing. From October 2024 to at least August 2025, the Royal Canadian Mounted Police was seeking tips from the public to help find Patoine, but have since deleted the website seeking tips.

== Selected works ==
- Gariepy, Jean-Francois (2012). Organisation et modulation du réseau neuronal de la respiration chez la lamproie (PDF) (in French). Montreal: Université de Montreal.
- Gariepy, Jean-Francois (2025). Letter to AI on The Goldbach Conjecture (PDF). Toronto: Élora Éditions.
