= Kellie-Jay Keen-Minshull =

British anti-transgender activist

- Keen-Minshull in 2017
- Other name: Posie Parker
- Political party: Party of Women

Kellie-Jay Nyishie Keen-Minshull (née Keen), also known as Posie Parker, is a British anti-transgender and gender-critical activist. She is the leader of the political party Party of Women. She describes herself as a woman's rights activist, but says that she is "not a feminist". She is known for popularising the anti-trans slogan "adult human female".

Keen-Minshull is the founder of the group Standing for Women and a former special advisor to the Women's Liberation Front (WoLF). She has been described as a key figure opposing the United Kingdom's Gender Recognition Act 2004. She stood for election as MP for the constituency of Bristol Central in the 2024 United Kingdom general election, coming in last place with only 0.5% of the vote.

She has used billboards, posters, stickers and social media to promote anti-transgender rights messages, and has held events in the United Kingdom, the United States, Australia, and New Zealand that have been protested against by supporters of transgender rights.

== Biography and views ==
Keen-Minshull's activism includes opposition to legal protections and policies that allow transgender people to be legally recognised as their gender. She has opposed the UK Gender Recognition Act, the use of public toilets by transgender people according to their gender, and the participation of transgender people in sports that align with their gender. She has also opposed the use of puberty blockers and hormone replacement therapy for transgender children, and drag performances, especially in locations that may be viewed by children. According to PinkNews, Keen-Minshull has referred to the trans community as a "pernicious cult" and "previously compared trans people to sex offenders and serial killers".

Keen-Minshull is also a special advisor to the Women's Liberation Front. In March 2023, the New Zealand Herald described Keen-Minshull as "a key figure in the movement against the UK's Gender Recognition Act".

Hope not Hate has described her as "a leading voice in the anti-trans movement" and linked her to far-right extremism.

=== Billboards, posters and stickers ===
Keen-Minshull is credited for popularising the term "adult human female" to define a woman, which she began to promote in 2018 on billboards. The term is associated with gender-critical feminism.

In September 2018, under the pseudonym "Posie Parker", Keen-Minshull paid the advertising company Primesight to place a billboard poster in Liverpool with the text "woman, wʊmən, noun, adult human female", telling the BBC it was in response to support expressed by Liverpool mayor Joe Anderson for the trans community. Keen-Minshull said she was concerned the word "woman" was "being appropriated to mean anything" and that the poster was intended to "start a conversation" about women's rights. Primesight removed the poster following a complaint, stating it had been "unaware of the motive" and "misled" and was "fully committed to equality for all". In response to the poster, LGBT charity Stonewall noted in their 2018 Trans Report on violence and hate crimes against trans people that: "These are not just statistics, they represent the lives of trans people, which are only being made worse by increasingly frequent attacks in the media, online and in public spaces."

Standing for Women had a digital version of the poster placed on a billboard in Leeds on 19 October 2018, and Kong Outdoor, which owned the billboard, said the sign initially appeared to comply with Advertising Standards Authority regulations, but then removed it pending further investigation after becoming aware of "the controversy around the message."

In May 2019, a sticker stating "Women only. This is a single sex service under the Equality Act 2010" that was produced by Standing for Women and designed to appear official was removed from a Dundee Railway Station bathroom door after station staff were alerted. Keen-Minshull denied that the group had placed the sticker in the station and said "We are fed up that the protected category of sex in the Equality Act is routinely ignored and are standing up and saying we matter too."

On 27 July 2020, Keen-Minshull paid for a poster reading "I ❤ JK Rowling" to be displayed at Waverley Station in Edinburgh. Rowling had recently elicited controversy for her views on trans people. The poster was taken down by the Scotland wing of Network Rail on 30 July, who stated that the poster was removed for violating its advertising guidelines due to its political nature.

In July 2021, Speak Up for Women in New Zealand used the phrase "adult human female" in billboards, which were removed following complaints about transphobia.

HelloPrint, the company that had produced stickers, t-shirts, and other merchandise for Keen-Minshull over five years announced in February 2023 that it would no longer fill orders for Keen-Minshull, and "If we had been fully aware of her beliefs earlier, we would earlier have refused to print for her."

=== Social media ===
In 2018, after a complaint from Susie Green, then CEO of transgender charity Mermaids, Keen-Minshull was interviewed by West Yorkshire Police for suspicion of malicious communication in relation to tweets she had made. In 2019, Keen-Minshull said she was interviewed by Wiltshire Police for suspicion of harassment due to two YouTube videos she had produced that directed criticism at Green for supporting her daughter's transition. The 2018 case was closed with no further action.

In May 2018, Woman's Place UK, an organisation that opposes gender self-identification for trans people, announced that it had disinvited Keen-Minshull from a meeting, based on objections to "her stated views on race and religion." In 2022, Woman's Place UK published screenshots they said were from Keen's Twitter account and since deleted, to "clarify our own political ground", stating they had invited Keen-Minshull to discuss the 2018 police investigation related to her tweets, and since then, "many of her subsequent connections, statements and actions have only strengthened our decision not to work with her."

In January 2019, Keen-Minshull praised far-right activist Tommy Robinson in a podcast for Feminist Current.

On 30 January 2019, Sarah McBride, a transgender rights activist and press secretary for the Human Rights Campaign (HRC), participated in a panel discussion between members of the Parents for Transgender Equality National Council and members of the United States Congress, during a visit to Capitol Hill to advocate for the Equality Act. Afterwards, Keen-Minshull and Julia Long entered the room in the Cannon House Office Building where McBride was working, and recorded themselves on Facebook Live shouting at and misgendering her.

In response to the 30 January incident, an HRC spokesperson stated: "It is disturbing but not at all surprising that anti-transgender extremists brought to the United States at the behest of The Heritage Foundation would stoop to harassing a transgender woman and parents of transgender youth." A spokesperson for The Heritage Foundation denied a connection to the presence of Keen-Minshull and Long in the United States and said in reference to a Heritage Foundation panel discussion attended by Keen-Minshull that the organisation had "no contact with them before or after our Jan. 28 event, and have zero connection to anything they did afterward."

In October 2019, Keen-Minshull appeared in a video interview with Jean-François Gariépy, a far-right YouTuber who advocates for a "white ethno-state". She has also given an interview to Soldiers of Christ Online, a far-right network. Keen-Minshull denied prior knowledge of the interviewers' far-right affiliations. In 2019, Jean Hatchet, a gender-critical activist, expressed concerns about what she described as "right-wing links" developed by Keen-Minshull in the US, as well as her connections to The Heritage Foundation, writing on her blog: "I don't care what these people think about trans ideology. That cannot be separated from the things they do and advocate that specifically harm women."

In 2021, Keen-Minshull produced a YouTube video about Mridul Wadhwa, the director of the Edinburgh Rape Crisis Centre (ERCC), and referred to her as a "male CEO". Wadhwa had faced threats of violence that led to increased security at the ERCC, as well as an activist and social media campaign that opposed her hiring on the grounds that she was a trans woman.

=== Rallies, speaker events, and protests ===
==== United Kingdom and United States ====
In March 2022, Keen led a group protesting the inclusion of Lia Thomas at the NCAA Division I Women's Swimming Championship in Atlanta, also appearing on Tucker Carlson Tonight. On 19 June, Keen-Minshull and approximately 60 supporters held a rally in Bristol, which was met by approximately 100 counter-protestors organised by Bristol Against Hate. On 18 September, a rally in Brighton organised by Keen-Minshull as part of a speakers tour was met by hundreds of counter-protesters. Sussex police reported three arrests.

On 16 October, Keen-Minshull began a series of public speaking events organised by Standing for Women in the United States that were intended to tour eleven cities, starting in Los Angeles. In Los Angeles and the second stop in San Francisco, few supporters attended, and there were no counter-protesters nor police at the events. Keen-Minshull said threats from Antifa led her to cancel the speakers for an event in Portland, Oregon. In a video published on Twitter, an attendee at the Portland event was hit in the face with a pie. On 5 February 2023, Keen-Minshull organised a "Let Women Speak" protest in Glasgow's George Square in response to the passage of the Gender Recognition Reform (Scotland) Bill and the Isla Bryson case; hundreds of protesters and counterprotestors attended, and the counterprotestors were organised by the Cabaret Against The Hate Speech.

In May 2026, Keen-Minshull was a speaker at the "Unite the Kingdom" rally organised by Tommy Robinson. At the rally she called for the removal of Islam from classrooms and parliament.

==== Australia ====
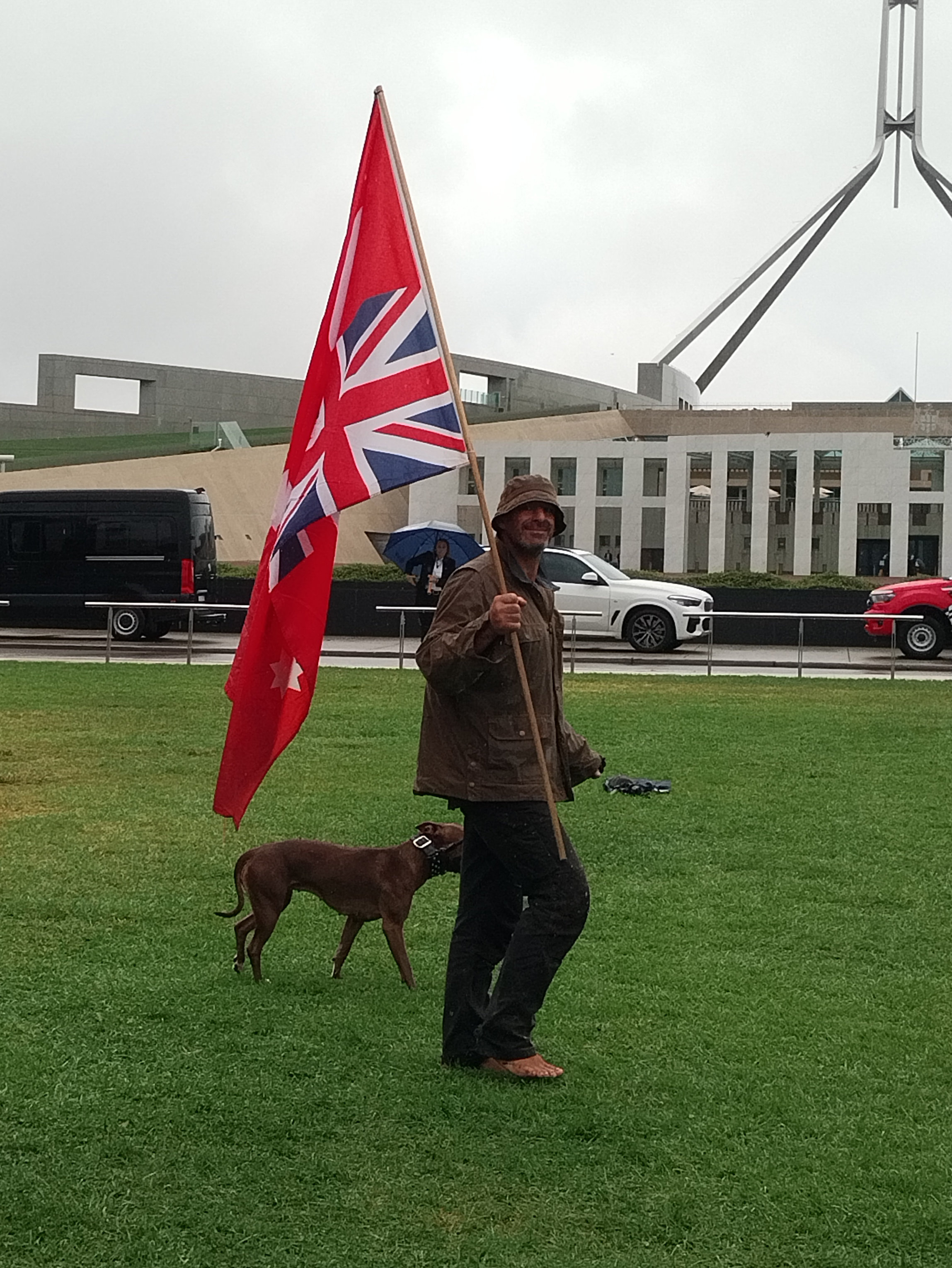
An attendee of Keen-Minshull's rally in Australia, 2023

In January 2023, Keen-Minshull announced plans to tour Australia and New Zealand in March. Stephen Bates, the Australian Greens' spokesperson for LGBTQIA+ communities, wrote to Immigration Minister Andrew Giles asking him to revoke Keen-Minshull's visa and posted the letter online with her name redacted. Keen-Minshull later said she was the subject of the letter. A petition also launched on Change.org to oppose the visa. By 18 February, the petition was removed to comply with Australia's defamation law. According to LGBTQIA+ rights activist Chris Johnson, who started the petition, there had been more than 11,167 signatures.

Keen-Minshull's Melbourne event on 18 March 2023 was attended by a group of at least 30 neo-Nazis, organised by the National Socialist Network and its leader Thomas Sewell, who were seen performing the Nazi salute on the steps of Parliament House and displaying a banner that read "Destroy Paedo Freaks". Overall attendance at the event was estimated to be between 300 and 400 supporters at the anti-transgender protest led by Keen-Minshull, and about twice as many counterprotesters. Following the event Keen-Minshull said "They're absolutely not associated with me whatsoever. I absolutely abhor anything to do with Nazis."

On 23 March 2023, Keen-Minshull held a rally outside of the Australia Parliament House in Canberra, attended by about 30 supporters, including One Nation Party senators Pauline Hanson and Malcolm Roberts and United Australia Party senator Ralph Babet. The rally was also attended by a group of about 100 counterprotesters, including senator Lidia Thorpe, who on video footage of the rally appeared to be pulled to the ground by police after she approached Keen-Minshull while shouting "you're not welcome here."

In March 2024, Keen-Minshull commenced a legal claim for defamation against John Pesutto, the leader of the opposition in the Australian State of Victoria. In May 2024, Keen-Minshull's claim against Pesutto was settled. He issued an apology in which he said that he had never intended to assert that Keen-Minshull was a Neo-Nazi. He said that he would pay a part of the legal costs, although he in fact secretly paid them in full, but not compensation. Keen-Minshull said she was delighted with the apology.

==== New Zealand ====
Following her Melbourne event, Keen-Minshull's permission to enter New Zealand was put under review by Immigration New Zealand on 20 March. In response, the centre-right National Party's deputy leader Nicola Willis argued that Keen-Minshull should be allowed into the country on free speech grounds. By contrast, the left-wing Green Party's immigration spokesperson Ricardo Menéndez March opposed Keen-Minshull's entry on the grounds that her presence would endanger the LGBT and Muslim communities. The review decided to allow her to enter New Zealand.

On 23 March, a coalition of LGBT support groups filed for a judicial review of the decision to allow Keen-Minshull to enter New Zealand. The following day, the High Court at Wellington ruled the decision was lawful. Before Keen-Minshull held events in New Zealand, Labour Immigration Minister Michael Wood described her views as "inflammatory, vile and incorrect."

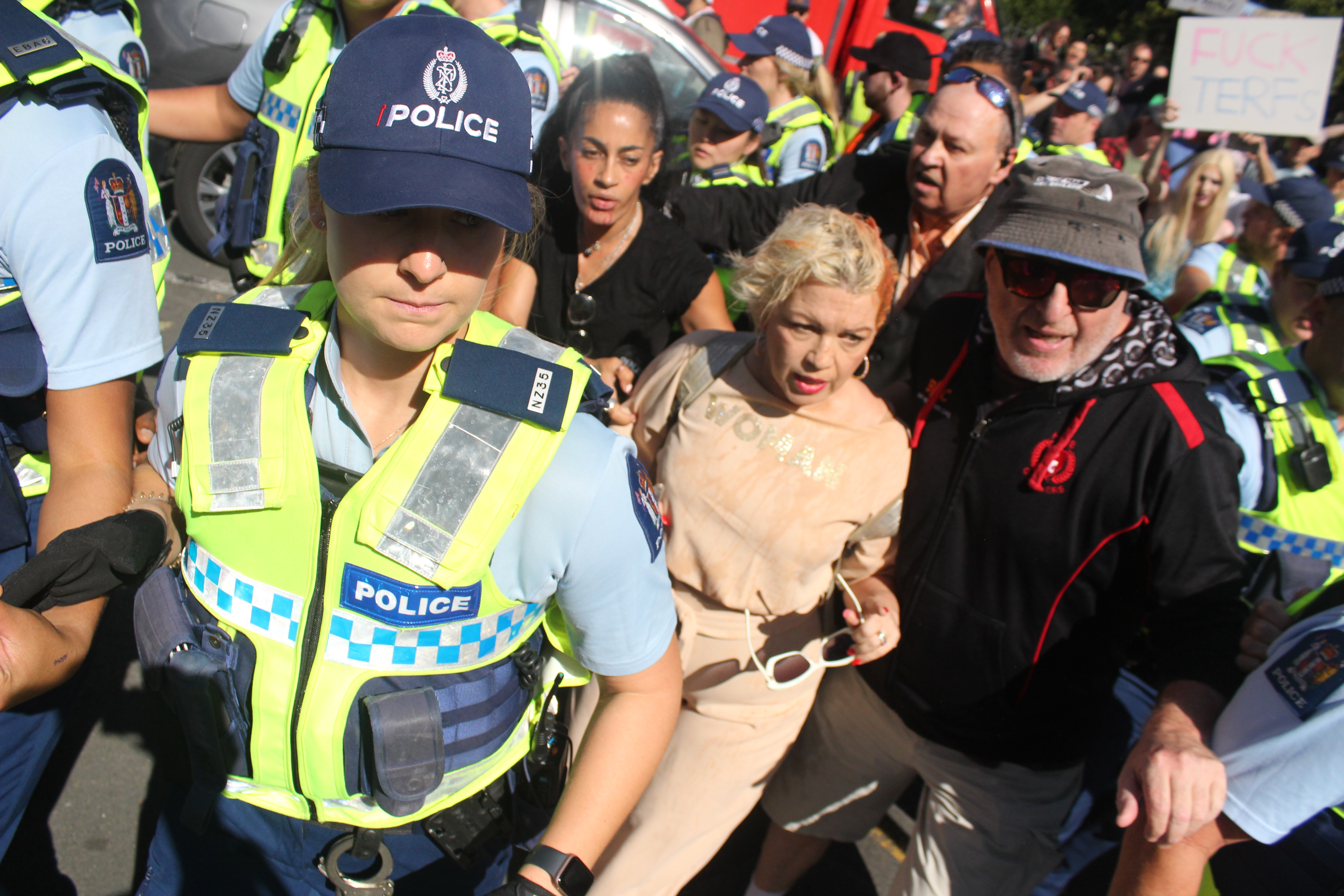
Keen-Minshull being escorted from her Auckland event by police in March 2023

On 25 March, a rally organised by Keen-Minshull in central Auckland was also attended by counter-protesters, estimated to number in the thousands, who made noise and chanted loudly before her appearance; tomato juice was poured on Keen-Minshull by intersex activist Eliana Rubashkyn, and Keen-Minshull left the area with a police escort before she could speak. The rally was also attended by a small group wearing Azov Battalion and Boogaloo Boys insignia, as well as a member of the white nationalist Action Zealandia group and members of right-wing groups including the New Conservative Party, Voices for Freedom, and Counterspin Media.

The Wellington event was subsequently cancelled. On 26 March, Keen-Minshull left New Zealand, saying it was the "worst place for women she has ever visited" and describing the media as corrupt and dishonest. National Party police spokesperson Mark Mitchell called for "a serious review" into policing failures at the protest.

According to Radio New Zealand, reporting of the event included descriptions of confrontations between supporters and protestors, as well as Keen-Minshull being drowned out by noise from protestors, while far-right media outlet Counterspin Media promoted "claims of rampant and unchecked violence." On 12 September 2023, the New Zealand Media Council and Broadcasting Standards Authority (BSA) dismissed 16 complaints against local media coverage of Keen-Minshull's Auckland visit and the ensuing counter-protests. These complaints had alleged that media coverage against Parker and her supporters was negative, portrayed her as transphobic, and disproportionately focused on the pro-transgender counter-protesters.

In early April 2023, Radio New Zealand reported that Keen-Minshull's New Zealand visit had led to a massive increase in online transphobia within the country, especially against public figures such as Green Party co-leader Marama Davidson and transgender activist Shaneel Lal, who participated in the counter-protest. Counter-extremism researcher Byron C. Clark observed that extremist groups in New Zealand had adopted transphobia as a "wedge issue" to exploit public fear and "get themselves closer to the mainstream."

On 16 September 2023, Keen-Minshull abandoned plans to travel for a second speaking engagement in New Zealand due to safety concerns. She had planned to speak at a protest outside Rubashkyn's hearing at the Auckland District Court on 20 September. In late October 2023, Judge Claire Ryan rejected Rubashkyn's application to have her two assault charges dismissed and ruled that she would face trial. In early September 2024, Rubashkyn was convicted of pouring tomato juice on Keen-Minshull and a second woman during the Auckland tour. She also pled guilty to two charges of assault and was discharged.

On 5 March 2024, a man who was filmed punching Judith Hobson, a 71-year old female supporter of Keen-Minshull, was granted a discharge without conviction and permanent name suppression by the Auckland District Court. The man, who had participated in the counter-protest against Keen-Minshull's Auckland talk, had punched Hobson three times in the face, causing concussion and bruising to her left eye and behind her left ear. He admitted a charge of common assault and was ordered by Judge Kevin Glubb to pay $1,000 in reparation to Hobson. Hobson criticised the court's decision to discharge the man without conviction, and ACT Party MP Laura Trask said it was a "tragedy for women". The man was subsequently doxed, with his name, occupation, photograph and town being shared on several social media platforms. Police confirmed that they investigating the doxing, which they described as a breach of the court suppression order.

In mid-May 2024, Keen-Minshull spoke via video link at the "Unsilenced Summit" in Wellington, which was organised by Inflection Point NZ to oppose what it regarded as the "gender indoctrination and medicalisation" of children. Despite protests Te Papa Museum, which owned the Wellington Convention Centre where the venue was held, allowed the conference to proceed. Other speakers at the conference including Destiny Church leader Brian Tamaki and former National Party MP Simon O'Connor. 360 people attended the Unsilenced conference while a protest organised by Pōneke Anti-Fascist Coalition and Queer Endurance in Defiance attracted 500 people.

=== Political career ===
In September 2022, in response to Eddie Izzard's announcement of her plan to run for MP of Sheffield Central, Keen-Minshull announced her own plan to run, saying she would "campaign on the basis of repealing the Gender Recognition Act" and "erase the word 'gender'". During her livestreamed announcement, she also called the hijab "atrocious" and a "tool of oppression", and referred to Tucker Carlson as "an intelligent, really lovely, welcoming, warmly welcoming man".

Following her Auckland rally in March 2023, Keen-Minshull announced her intention to form her own party, the Party of Women, and take on Labour leader Keir Starmer in his Holborn and St Pancras constituency at the 2024 United Kingdom general election.

On 8 February 2024, the Party of Women was registered by the UK Electoral Commission, with Keen as the leader. She announced the registration of the party through a livestream on her YouTube channel on the same day. On 8 June 2024, Keen announced that she would run for the Bristol Central seat. She came in last place, with 196 votes, equating to 0.5% of the vote and lost her deposit.

== Personal life ==
Keen-Minshull was raised in Somerset and has an older sister, a husband, and four children.

== See also ==
- Hands Across the Aisle Coalition
