= Quit lit =

Quit lit may refer to:

- Quit lit (academia), a literary genre of autobiographical apologia, issued publicly, when leaving a job or industry, particularly academia
- Quit lit (alcohol cessation), a literary genre on alcohol cessation
