= Candlestick murder =

1958 murder in Charleston, South Carolina

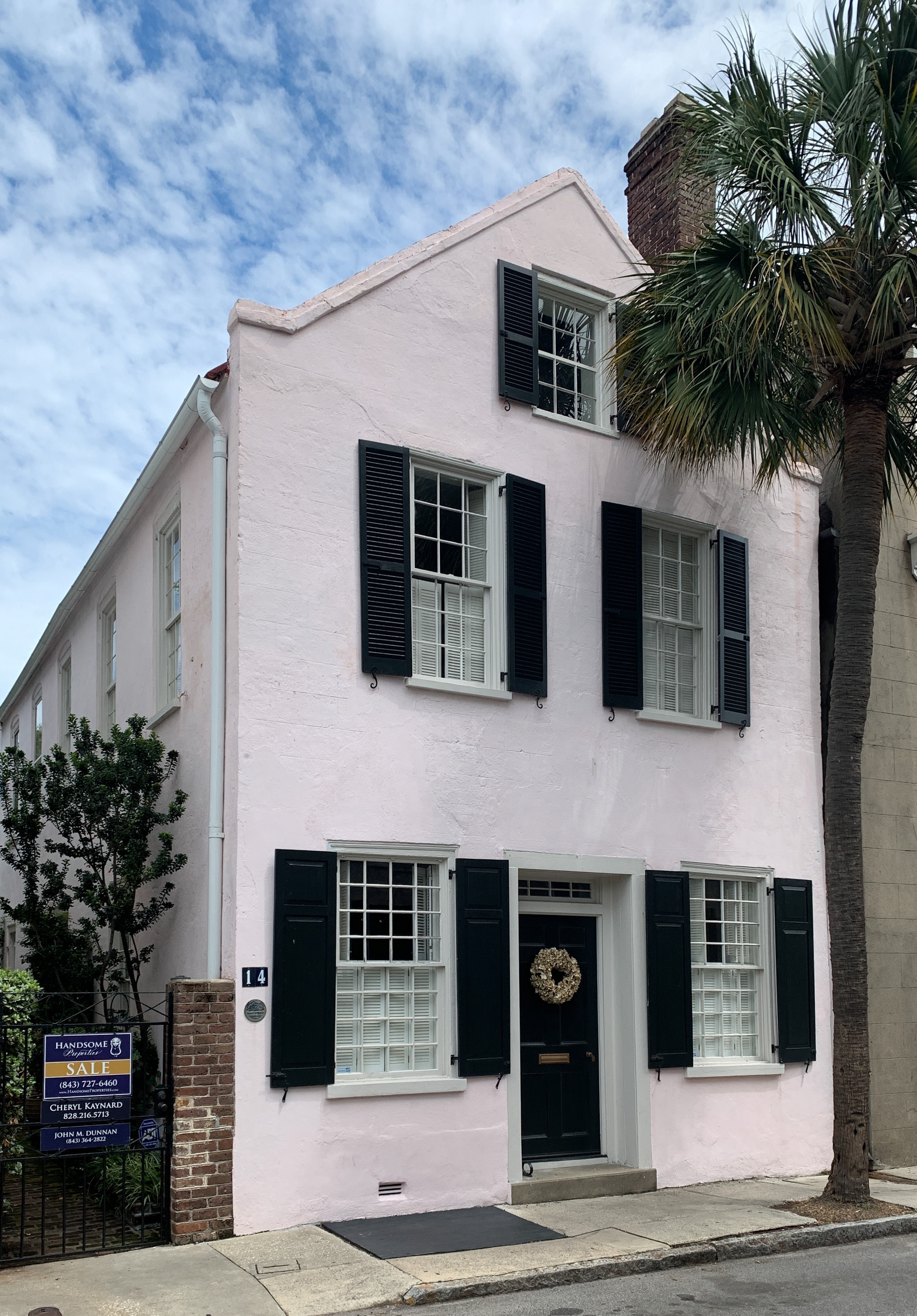
Queen Street house of Jack Dobbins and Edward Otey

The Candlestick murder refers to the murder of Jack Dobbins by John Mahon in Charleston, South Carolina on October 31, 1958. The acquittal of the confessed killer on the gay panic defense led to widespread fear in Charleston's gay community.

== Murder ==
Jack Dobbins was a 30 year old chemical company executive at the Davidson Chemical Co. Division of W.R. Grace and Company at the time of his murder on October 31, 1958; his murder is believed to have occurred during the hours of 1:30 to 7:00 am. According to friends of Dobbins, he had gone to a Halloween party with his roommate Edward Otey, a 25-year-old student at the Medical University of South Carolina, and several other friends and is reported to have left the party at 2:00 am on November the 1st. When reporting to the home of Dobbins on Queen Street, Elizabeth Bryant, Dobbins' maid, found him dead on his living room sofa unclothed. Bryant alerted Dobbins' housemate, Edward Otey, who had been asleep upstairs and Otey proceeded to call the police. The Charleston News and Courier reported Dobbins injuries saying that his "head was bloodied from repeated blows near the left ear". The weapon believed to have used in the murder of Dobbins was a brass candlestick holder found in the arms of Jack Dobbins at the scene causing the assault to be referred to as the Candlestick murder. An autopsy of Dobbins indicated that he had been struck nine times resulting in the fracturing of his skull in three places. Coroner Jennings Cauthren stated that there were no signs of struggle to the attack which he said suggests that the attack was a surprise to Dobbins.

== Suspects ==
Dobbins' housemate, Edward Otey (1934–1969) was an initial suspect but was later dismissed. John Mahon became the primary suspect. Mahon was an 18 year old airman that Dobbins had met at Club 49, a mixed gay and straight bar in Charleston on October 31, 1958, where Dobbins helped to "tend bar". Dobbins had served Mahon a few drinks before they decided to continue their night at the Elbow Cocktail bar, where Mahon was denied entry because he could not comply with their dress code. They returned to Dobbins' house on Queen Street in the early morning of November 1.

Mahon claimed to have thought Dobbins to only be unconscious after hitting him and that he became aware of Dobbins death through newspapers. Mahon turned himself into the police and admitted to the murder claiming self defense. The Charleston News and Courier published Mahon's account of the night, writing that Dobbins had brought Mahon back to his residence on Queen Street and served him whisky and proceeded to make "improper advances". The Charleston News and Courier went on to report that the "advances" made Mahon uncomfortable and that he tried to "think of a method of escape". Mahon used the restroom and upon returning found Dobbins "unclothed" in the living room. It is then that Mahon claims that Dobbins told him to "come here John" prompting Mahon to run upstairs where he obtained the candlestick from the bedroom of Dobbins and upon returning downstairs where he said that he told Dobbins that he wanted to leave.

== Trial of John Mahon ==
Mahon was put on trial for Dobbins' murder on December 9, 1958. Witnesses at the trial made allusions to Dobbins' sexuality, commenting that he didn't often have female visitors. Mahon testified that Dobbins had made advances and that Mahon had attacked to knock Dobbins out, not to kill him. While testifying, Mahon was quoted that he "hit [Dobbins] three or four times" after which Dobbins "fell on the couch"; Mahon says that he proceeded to "[toss] the candlestick down on the couch and ran out the door". The state had called for the death penalty against Mahon. The prosecution tried to cite robbery as a motive for the murder of Jack Dobbins. Solicitor Theodore D. Stoney claimed that in the case of Dobbins it would have been a robbery as "some people preyed on persons of abnormal behavior to get money"; this was a reference to Dobbins' sexuality.

Mahon appeared in front of the all-male jury to testify. He was later found not guilty by the jury under the argument of self defense that was presented by the defense. He was allowed to return home with his family to celebrate Christmas.

== Aftermath ==
Billy Camden, a member of the local gay community, stated that the attack and the verdict made the gay community distrust the justice system. "By emphasizing accepted gender roles, the defense lawyers placed sexuality on the list of concerns for those in Charleston looking to maintain the old social order of veiled white supremacy and racial segregation," writes Thompson, current head of digital research services at University of Houston Libraries. "Furthermore, the close coverage of the trial by local and regional newspapers helped to spread the consequences of sexual non-conformity to a wider audience, even if these newspapers did not blatantly engage in a discussion on homosexuality. The trial served as just one in a series of reminders on what the white power structure of Charleston and other Southern cities would tolerate." Leonard Matlovich recalled the Candlestick murder as a reminder of the negative consequences of homosexuality.
