= Miriam Ben-Shalom =

American educator and activist (born 1948)

Miriam Ben-Shalom; מרים בן שלום
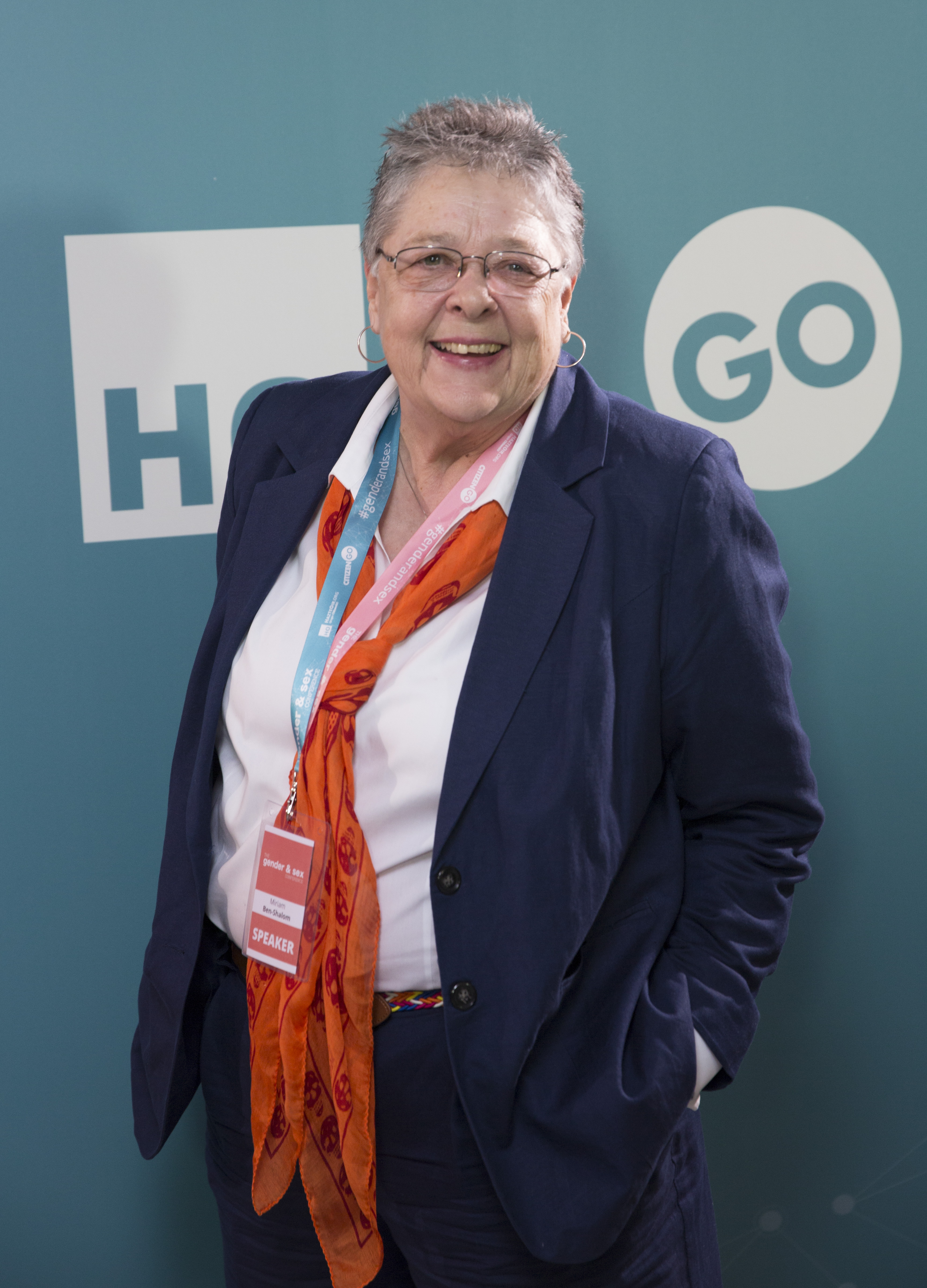
- Miriam Ben-Shalom in 2018
- Born: May 3, 1948 (age 78); Waukesha, Wisconsin
- Military career
- Allegiance: Israel (1968–1970); United States of America (1974–1990)
- Branch: United States Army Reserve; Israeli Army
- Service years: 1974–1976; 1988–1990
- Rank: Staff Sergeant
- Units: 84th Training Division, 5091st Reception Battalion
- Conflicts: War of Attrition
- Other work: Suing for Army reinstatement; Founding American Veterans for Equal Rights; Protesting against DADT policy; Public school teacher

Miriam Ben-Shalom (Hebrew: מרים בן שלום; born May 3, 1948) is an Israeli-American educator, activist and former Staff Sergeant in the United States Army. After being discharged from the military for homosexuality in 1976, she successfully challenged her discharge in court and returned to military service in 1987—the first openly gay person to be reinstated after being discharged under the military's policy excluding homosexuals from military service. She served until 1990 when the Army succeeded in terminating her service after prolonged judicial proceedings.

== Early life ==
Ben-Shalom was born in Waukesha, Wisconsin, one of six children in a Roman Catholic family, and grew up in the surrounding area of Big Bend and East Troy. After her mother died in an automobile accident when she was six, she was largely raised by her father, a World War II veteran and owner of a local chain of convenience stores. Graduating from high school in 1967, she married for a short time and had a daughter. The next year, she converted to Judaism and, at the age of 19, left with her daughter for a five-year residence in Israel, where she took up Israeli citizenship, remarried, changed her name to her current name and served in the Israeli Army during the War of Attrition as the driver of an armored personnel carrier. In 1971, she returned to the United States, divorced and entered the University of Wisconsin–Milwaukee, majoring in creative writing and graduating with a B.A. and M.A.

== Service, discharges and activism ==
In 1974, Ben-Shalom enlisted in the United States army reserve and joined the 84th Training Division. In 1975, she read the cover story of Time magazine's interview with Leonard Matlovich, a Vietnam War Air Force veteran who decided to come out of the closet as a homosexual and was fighting his discharge. Although Ben-Shalom was out to her commander, the commander made no move to dismiss her until, after graduating from drill sergeant's school, she appeared on local television and outed herself as lesbian. Her commander filed discharge proceedings against her, and she was honorably discharged in 1976.

Ben-Shalom took the Army to court to overturn her dismissal, and in 1980 Judge Terence Evans of the U.S. District Court in Chicago ruled that her dismissal violated the First, Fifth and Ninth Amendments of the U.S. Constitution based upon testimony that she was only dismissed because of her statement to the press. The Army refused to comply with the ruling, and the case dragged on until 1987 when the U.S. Court of Appeals in Chicago confirmed the previous ruling and forced the Army to comply with the ruling by threatening contempt of court fines. Ben-Shalom reenlisted in September 1988, but the Army appealed the decision and finally won an August 1989 decision from Judge Harlington Wood, Jr. that ruled against Ben-Shalom by ruling her statement to the press as an admission of guilt in violating military policy. The U.S. Supreme Court declined to hear her appeal of the case on February 26, 1990, and Ben-Shalom's military career ended.

Ben-Shalom returned to Waukesha and was one of six LGBT veterans who founded the Gay, Lesbian and Bisexual Veterans of America (GLBVA), today known as the American Veterans for Equal Rights.

She continued to participate in a number of protests against the military policy excluding homosexuals from service and in 1993 protested the military's new "Don't ask, don't tell" (DADT) policy by joining David Mixner in chaining herself to the White House fence. After a long period of work as a teacher, she returned to direct action and was arrested on November 15, 2010, in uniform after chaining herself to the White House fence along with other participants, including Dan Choi.

== Personal life ==
She is a member of the New England Gay, Lesbian and Bisexual Veterans and of the California Alexander Hamilton American Legion Post 448. A resident of Milwaukee with her life partner, Karen Weiss also serves as a full-time tenured instructor of English with the Milwaukee Area Technical College.

== Tributes ==
In 2015, she was named by Equality Forum as one of their 31 Icons of the 2015 LGBT History Month.

== Opposition to transgender rights ==
In 2016, Ben-Shalom was invited to be the Grand Marshal of the Milwaukee Pride Parade. Shortly after the invitation was made, the Board of Directors of the non-profit organization behind the parade became aware of comments about transgender women on her Facebook page that were considered to be transphobic. They rescinded the invitation in an email letter to Ben-Shalom that she made public in a Facebook post:

The Bylaws of the Milwaukee Pride Parade include our mission statement, "To provide an outlet to the citizens of South Eastern Wisconsin in which GLBT individuals and groups can participate in a parade to show their pride." We are an inclusive organization that seeks to be free of intolerance, and seeks to promote the equality of all members of the community. As such, we feel that we cannot have a Grand Marshal who has publically [sic] and repeatedly denigrated transwomen.

In March 2017, she testified before the Texas Senate Committee on State Affairs in support of Senate Bill 6, which would require transgender people to use the bathroom or changing facility of the sex stated on a person's birth certificate rather than of their gender self-identification.

Ben-Shalom has also availed herself of the support offered by conservative media outlets and organizations. In 2017, she co-founded the Hands Across the Aisle Coalition, a nonpartisan coalition of "radical feminists, lesbians, Christians and conservatives" who oppose "gender identity legislation". That same year, she appeared in the "Biology Isn't Bigotry: Why Sex Matters in the Age of Gender Identity" panel sponsored by The Heritage Foundation. In February 2018, she was a speaker at the "Gender and Sex Conference" in Madrid, sponsored by HazteOir/CitizenGo.

== See also ==
- Sexual orientation and the United States military
