= Alan G. Rogers =

United States Army officer (1967–2008)

Alan Greg Rogers
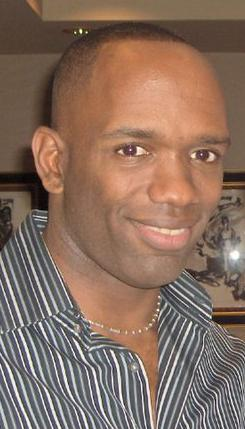
- Born: September 21, 1967
- Died: January 27, 2008 (aged 40); Baghdad, Iraq
- Burial place: Arlington National Cemetery
- Military career
- Allegiance: United States of America
- Branch: United States Army
- Service years: 1990–2008
- Rank: Major
- Units: Military Transition Team, 1st Brigade, 1st Infantry Division, Fort Riley, Kansas
- Conflicts: Operation Iraqi Freedom
- Awards: Bronze Star (2); Purple Heart
- Other work: American Veterans for Equal Rights (AVER)

Alan Greg Rogers (September 21, 1967 – January 27, 2008) was an ordained Baptist pastor, a U.S. Army major and intelligence officer, a civil rights activist in the gay, lesbian and bisexual military community and the first-known gay combat fatality of Operation Iraqi Freedom. The subsequent coverage of his death in the media sparked a debate over the effect of the military's "don't ask, don't tell" (DADT) policy and what information should be included in the biography of a gay military person killed in action.

== Early life and education ==
At the age of 3, Rogers was adopted by George and Genny Rogers and was their only child. In 1977, the Rogers family moved from New York City to Hampton, Florida, near Gainesville. Rogers attended Hampton Elementary School, and ultimately graduated from Bradford County High School in Starke, Florida, in 1985. Rogers joined Ebenezer Missionary Baptist Church in Lincoln City, Florida, and was ordained a pastor as a young man. While in high school, Rogers was commander of the Junior Reserve Officers' Training Corps program and elected by his classmates as the "most intellectual."

== Military career and adult life ==
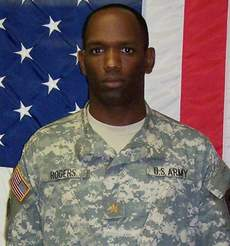
Department of Defense photograph of Alan G. Rogers

After high school, Rogers joined the Reserve Officers' Training Corps program at the University of Florida and then accepted a commission in the United States Army upon graduation with a Bachelor of Arts degree in religion in 1995. Rogers later completed a Master of Arts degree in organizational management from the University of Phoenix through distance learning. Rogers's father, George, died of a heart attack in 2000, and his mother, Genny, died of kidney-related problems two weeks later. Rogers preached at his mother's funeral.

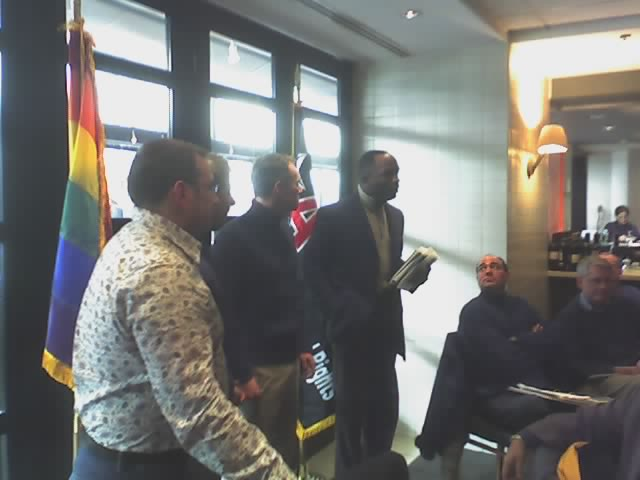
Alan G. Rogers receiving award at AVER, January 16, 2005

In 2001, Rogers commanded a military intelligence company based out of Waegwan, South Korea. During his tenure as company commander, Rogers emphasized unit morale and cohesiveness, often organizing company-wide get-togethers and functions.

In 2004, Rogers moved to Washington, D.C. and, in 2005, earned a Master of Public Policy degree from Georgetown University. Only 25 Army officers were accepted into the program. Rogers's thesis adviser was Mark Nadel, who described Rogers as "an officer with leadership qualities that made him think, 'This is a guy I'm going to hear from in 10 years, and he's going to be a general.'" Rogers's thesis examined how the U.S. military's DADT policy affected recruitment and retention for military officers. In recognition of his achievements at Georgetown, Rogers gained an internship at the Pentagon serving the deputy secretary of defense, Gordon R. England.

Beginning in October 2004, Rogers served as Treasurer of the Washington, D.C. chapter of the American Veterans for Equal Rights (AVER). On January 16, 2005, Rogers received an award from the organization for his service at a ceremony held at Dupont Grill. Rogers also attended events supporting the Servicemembers Legal Defense Network (SLDN), which works to end the DADT policy.

Rogers expressed his opinion on the "don't ask don't tell" (DADT) policy in his Master's thesis, written in 2005 shortly before he was deployed to Iraq and reportedly killed by an improvised explosive device (IED) while on foot patrol: "Today's current policy on gays in the military seems to rest on many faulty assumptions—namely that homosexuals will jeopardize unit cohesiveness. My research has been unable to justify that position and has found that the opposite is more true. Denying service members the right to serve freely and openly violates basic dignity and respect of the human experience and puts our national security at risk."

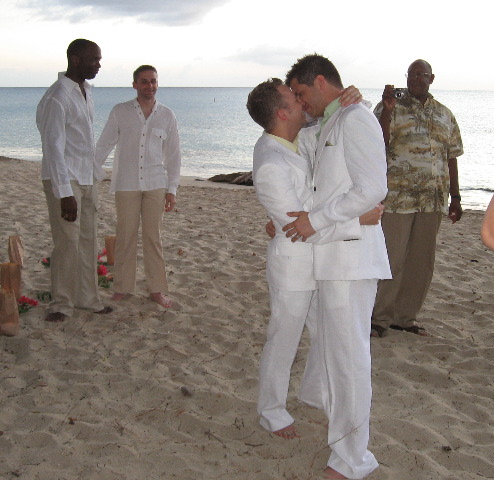
Major Alan G. Rogers (top left) holding hands with his date during same-sex wedding ceremony on June 28, 2006

In June 2006, Rogers provided the opening prayer for a same-sex wedding ceremony. Rogers reportedly expressed "an intensely deep loneliness that stemmed from his inability to have both a [same-sex] relationship ... and the military career he also loved so much."

In July 2007, Rogers was deployed to Iraq. Friends organized a send-off party in his honor on July 14, 2007, held at the Fabulous Bed & Breakfast in northwest Washington, D.C.

Rogers's commanding officer in Iraq was Col. Thomas Fernandez. Rogers communicated via e-mail with many of his friends during his deployment, and two of his friends from AVER received e-mail from Rogers the day before he died.

== Death and afterward ==
According to an Army report, Rogers was killed by an improvised explosive device while on foot patrol in Baghdad, on January 27, 2008. On January 30, 2008, friends of Rogers established the Alan G. Rogers Memorial Scholarship Fund.

A funeral service was held for Rogers at Ebenezer Baptist Church on February 8, 2008. In honor of Rogers, Florida Gov. Charlie Crist ordered the Florida and U.S. flags be flown at half-staff at the Bradford County Courthouse, Hampton City Hall and the Florida State Capitol. Family members later expressed that "we really didn't know about [Rogers being gay] until after his death." Rogers's beneficiary from Florida later stated that he knew Rogers was gay, but felt it had "no more relevance than I'm straight."

Rogers was buried with full military honors at Arlington National Cemetery on March 14, 2008, in Section 60, at Gravesite 8558. About 200 people attended the service, including Deputy Secretary of Defense Gordon England, Army Lt. Gen. John F. Kimmons, active duty military, both enlisted and officers, Rogers's friends and family from Florida, and Rogers's friends in northern Virginia, and Washington, D.C. Also in attendance were a dozen or more gay active-duty military personnel.

== National media coverage of Rogers's funeral ==
Rogers's funeral gained national media publicity, initially on MSNBC, in The Washington Post and on National Public Radio's Morning Edition. However, initial reports omitted Rogers's sexual orientation or anything related to the subject.

The Post and NPR reports coincided with the "grim milestone" that the U.S. military death toll reached 4,000 dead. Rogers's death and funeral gained further media attention when it was revealed that he was gay and worked to end the military's DADT policy.

Initially, members of the national media were well aware of Rogers's sexual orientation, yet it was widely reported that Rogers was not married and left no children. While technically accurate, some members of the LGBTQ community viewed the statement as an intentional distortion and dodge of Rogers's sexual orientation.

Rogers's cousin, Cathy Long of Ocala, Florida, said, "The Post did a wonderful job. Personally, as far as the family is concerned, we really didn't know about this until after his death. It was in the back of our minds, but we didn't discuss it." Cathy Long accepted Rogers's flag at the major's funeral. "I really feel Alan was a lot more than that," said Cathy Long who called the Washington Blade story "self-serving whatever their cause is and that they're trying to use Alan to do that."

The Washington Post ombudsman, Deborah Howell, stated that the editors of the Post deliberated the question of whether to disclose his sexual orientation and ultimately made a decision not to include such information.

The Army asked that Rogers's sexual orientation not be disclosed, and the Army presented it as a concern of the family.

The Washington Blade reported on the Post's decision to change the story and included more details about Rogers's activities and friends in the LGBTQ community. Subsequently, Howell of The Washington Post, citing Rogers's apparent feelings on DADT, wrote a column admitting that the Post's article "would have been richer" had it disclosed his sexual orientation and activities in the GLBT community.

On March 31, 2008, an anonymous attempt was made to remove information relating to Rogers's sexual orientation from the present Wikipedia article. The IP address associated with the attempt corresponds with the IP address for the office of the Army Deputy Chief of Staff for Intelligence (G-2) at the Pentagon, currently headed by Lt. Gen. John Kimmons. Kimmons attended Rogers's funeral and presented the U.S. flag from Rogers's coffin to a family member. The Army subsequently denied that the IP address associated with the changes "necessarily belongs to any one specific office."

The August 4, 2008, issue of The New Yorker magazine published a lengthy profile of Rogers, and the larger issues surrounding the DADT debate spurred on by his death. The story quotes Colonel Mike Hardy, who worked with Major Rogers at the Pentagon, as saying, "He did not make any moves to be remembered as a gay soldier. Nowhere in those phone calls home did he say, 'let everyone know that I died a proud gay officer.'" Ben McGrath, the author of the article, then comments, "Of course, being a proud gay officer is tantamount, under the current military policy, to being a retired gay officer with no pension."

In December 2010, the U.S. Congress passed a bill providing for the potential repeal of DADT pending certain conditions. Those were confirmed in July 2011 by President Barack Obama, the Secretary of Defense, and Chair of the Joint Chiefs of Staff, and repeal took effect on September 20, 2011.

== Awards ==
- Bronze Star (2)
- Purple Heart
