= Kara Dansky =

American attorney and gender-critical feminist

Kara Dansky is an American lawyer, public speaker, writer, and consultant. Dansky is best known for her gender-critical activism. She is the president of the American chapter of the gender-critical group, Women's Declaration International. From 2016 to 2020, she served on the board of Women's Liberation Front, which has also been described as gender-critical.

In November 2021, she published "The Abolition of Sex: How the 'Transgender' Agenda Harms Women and Girls". Dansky graduated with a Juris Doctor Degree from the University of Pennsylvania Law School and a Bachelor of Arts from Johns Hopkins University.

== Education ==
Dansky received a BA from Johns Hopkins University and a JD from the University of Pennsylvania Law School.

== Career ==
Dansky was the executive director of the Stanford Criminal Justice Center at Stanford Law School. While director, she focused on linking the work of those in academia studying criminal justice with policy makers.

In 2014, Dansky authored the ACLU study War Comes Home: The Excessive Militarization of American Policing which concluded that the increasing application of military tactics and weapons by American police was unnecessarily putting civilians at risk of injury and death.

In 2015, Dansky appeared in the documentary film Peace Officer which explores the militarization of police in the United States through several incidents that occurred in Utah.

From 2016 to 2020, Dansky served on the board of the Women's Liberation Front. She has appeared on Tucker Carlson's Fox program to discuss her views.

In 2020, Dansky testified in support a bill in the South Dakota legislature that would ban the prescribing of hormones or sex-reassignment surgery for transgender youth.

In 2021, Dansky authored the book The Abolition of Sex: How the 'Transgender' Agenda Harms Women and Girls.

In 2023, Dansky published The Reckoning: How the Democrats and the Left Betrayed Women and Girls.

Dansky is the current president of the American chapter of Women's Declaration International.

Dansky has partnered with May Mailman of the conservative Independent Women's Forum in working to define male and female in law according to a definition rooted in biology. Mailman has called TERF activists, particularly Dansky, as the main intellectual force behind the effort, stating that "the ones that were really driving the charge and had just a lot more knowledge and background, and had been thinking about these issues, writing about these issues, for such a long time, tended to be people on the left."

== Personal life ==
Dansky is a Shambhala International certified meditation instructor.
