= Eliana Rubashkyn =

Formerly stateless New Zealand pharmacist

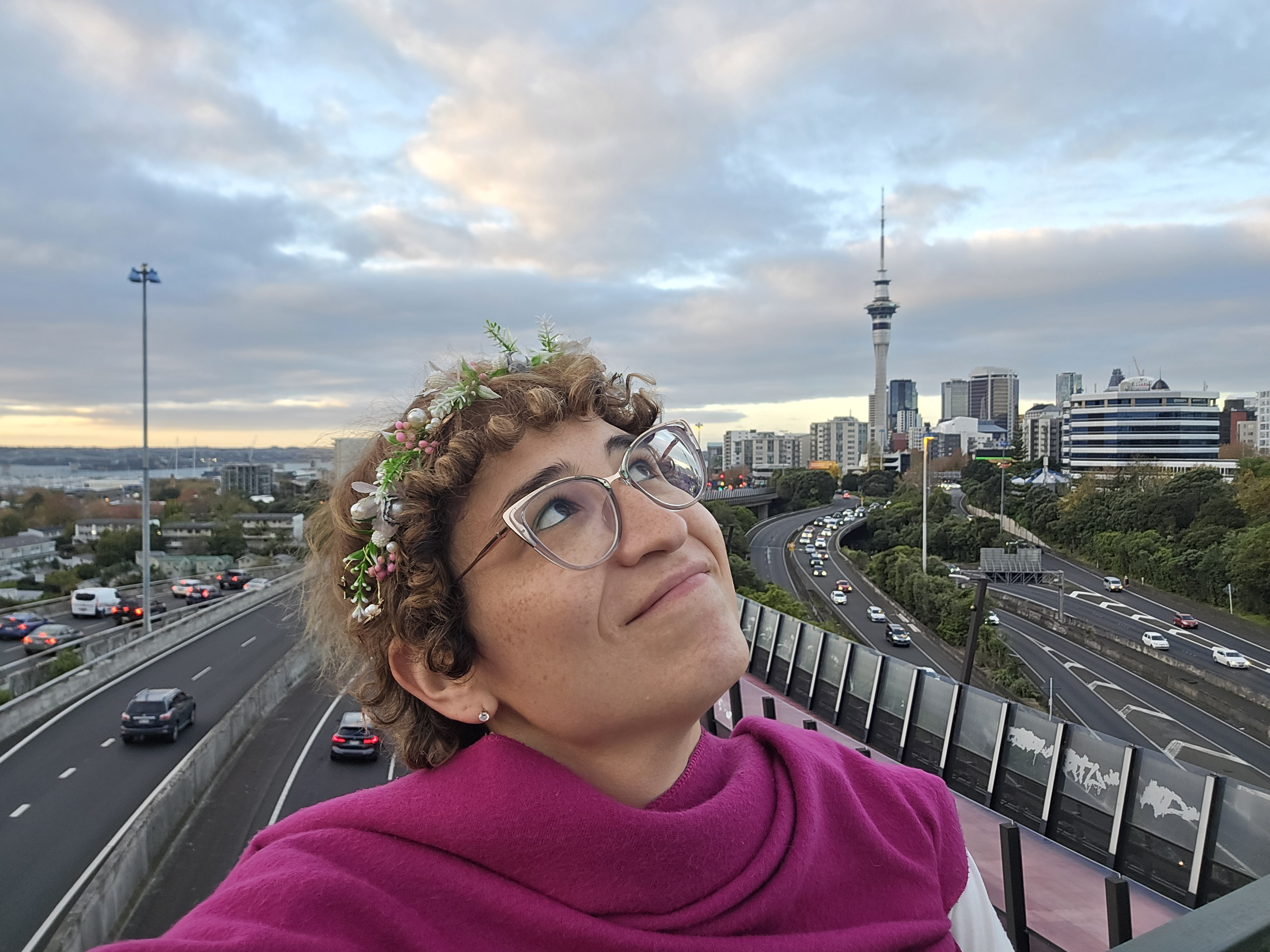
- Rubashkyn in Auckland.
- Born: 25 June 1988 (age 38); Bogotá, Colombia
- Other names: Eliana Golberstein, Sasha Rubashkina
- Citizenship: Colombia, New Zealand
- Occupations: Pharmacist, chemist, human rights advocate, scientist, polyglot.

Eliana Rubashkyn (born 25 June 1988) is a Colombian-born New Zealand pharmacist, chemist, and human rights advocate, known for her (Note: Rubashkyn uses both they/them and she/her pronouns. This article uses she/her for consistency.) work at the intersection of science, public health, and international law. She became the first intersex and transgender person assigned male at birth to be legally recognised as a woman under a mechanism of the United Nations refugee protection system, without undergoing gender-affirming surgery. Her landmark case helped establish precedent for gender identity recognition under the 1951 Refugee Convention.

Rubashkyn was detained in Hong Kong International Airport in 2012 after discrepancies between her gender identity and official documents led to her being denied entry. She subsequently spent over a year stateless and held in detention and asylum facilities across Hong Kong, facing discrimination and mistreatment. With the assistance of Amnesty International and UNHCR, she was eventually resettled in New Zealand in 2014, where she was granted full citizenship in 2018.

In parallel with her activism, Rubashkyn has published research on respiratory aerosol dynamics, public health, and harm reduction science, including co-authored peer-reviewed studies on vaping and COVID-19 aerosol transmission. Her work has been cited in international policy discussions on pandemic preparedness and nicotine regulation.

She has held roles with ILGA World and Intersex Asia, working on global strategies to advance bodily autonomy, gender recognition, and access to life-saving medicines for intersex and LGBTIQ+ communities. In 2023, Rubashkyn was involved in a counter-protest during an anti-trans rally in Auckland, during which she threw tomato juice on British activist Kellie-Jay Keen-Minshull. She pleaded guilty and was convicted and discharged, serving no prison time.

== Biography ==
Rubashkyn was born in Colombia to a Ukrainian mother who had moved there in the 1970s.

She has described her heritage as a convergence of Eastern European, Jewish, Soviet, Indigenous Muisca. Her mother, Tamara Vyacheslavovna Rubashkina, was a Soviet-trained pediatrician and daughter of Lida Rubashkina, a World War II Doctor, and Vyacheslav Rubashkin, a decorated Russian-Jewish veteran of the Battle of Stalingrad who participated in the liberation of several concentration camps in Eastern Europe.

She was born with the intersex condition of partial androgen insensitivity syndrome and was assigned male at birth.

In 2011, Rubashkyn obtained her degree in pharmacy and chemistry at the National University of Colombia, and speaks five languages fluently. After studying molecular biology in the University of Granada, she was granted a scholarship to develop postgraduate studies in public health at the Taipei Medical University, and at the same time started her transition and gender-affirming care in Taiwan. Rubashkyn identified that being stabbed in Colombia was catalyst for her decision to seek higher education elsewhere.

=== Statelessness ===
Within a year of starting hormone replacement therapy, Rubashkyn's physical appearance changed dramatically due to her intersex condition, and the Taiwanese immigration authorities required her to update her passport at the closest Colombian consulate before she could begin her second year of master's studies. She travelled to Hong Kong to do so, but when she arrived at Hong Kong International Airport's immigration facility, she was detained for over eight months in several detention and refugee centres because of her ambiguous legal condition.

Rubashkyn suffered from abusive mistreatment and constant sexual abuse and harassment in several of the reclusion centres in which she lived. She was restrained in a psychiatric ward of the Queen Elizabeth Hospital in Kowloon, caused by an attempted suicide, after being mistreated and sexually abused.

Unable to seek asylum to be granted protection as a refugee in Hong Kong due to the government not having ratified the UN Refugee Convention, she faced deportation, and suffered severe mistreatment in the airport's detention centre. Rubashkyn refused to contact her home embassy to prevent deportation because of the lack of diplomatic assistance they offered, and she became de facto stateless on 30 October 2012. Rubashkyn's position as a refugee limited the contact she could have with authorities from the governments of Colombia.

With the help of Amnesty International and the United Nations High Commissioner for Refugees (UNHCR), she was granted refugee status; however, because Hong Kong is not a signatory of the 1951 refugee convention, it did not recognise her as a refugee and sought to deport her to Colombia.

Her case drew international attention, particularly in Southeast Asia and Colombia, where transgender, gender diverse people and intersex people are often persecuted. Her case was also noted in New Zealand, a country known for its stance on equality for LGBTI people. In December 2013, the UN offered a solution by recognising Rubashkyn as a woman under the UNHCR refugee system. She became the first gender diverse person recognised as a woman in China without having undergone a sex reassignment surgery or medical intervention. A CNN story about her struggle and a short documentary about her life in Hong Kong won a GLAAD Media Award in May 2015.

=== Resettlement ===
In May 2014, New Zealand accepted Rubashkyn as a refugee and granted her asylum, extending a universal recognition of her gender. Her case was the first in the world in which the gender identity of a person was recognised internationally. In 2015, Rubashkyn's marriage received significant media attention when the NZ Registrar of Marriages asked for Rubashkyn's dead name, alongside her legal name, to register the marriage.

In 2019, Rubashkyn gave evidence as part of the investigation into the murder of Grace Millane, after realising she had served the accused in an Auckland pharmacy.

== Career ==
Since being resettled in New Zealand, Rubashkyn has worked as a pharmacist and is involved in a number of advocacy roles.

=== Activism ===
Rubashkyn has advocated for rights of refugees and intersex, transgender, and gender diverse people in New Zealand and globally. Rubashkyn has made contributions to United Nations Development Program and United Nations High Commissioner for Refugees in her capacity as the co-founder of Rainbow Path Aotearoa New Zealand, a LGBT refugee advocacy charity.

Rubashkyn co-authored together with Renee Dixon, and Tina Dixon the 2019 Canberra Statement on access to safety and justice for LGBTIQ+ asylum seekers and refugees, contributing intersex and refugee perspectives to this international advocacy policy document.

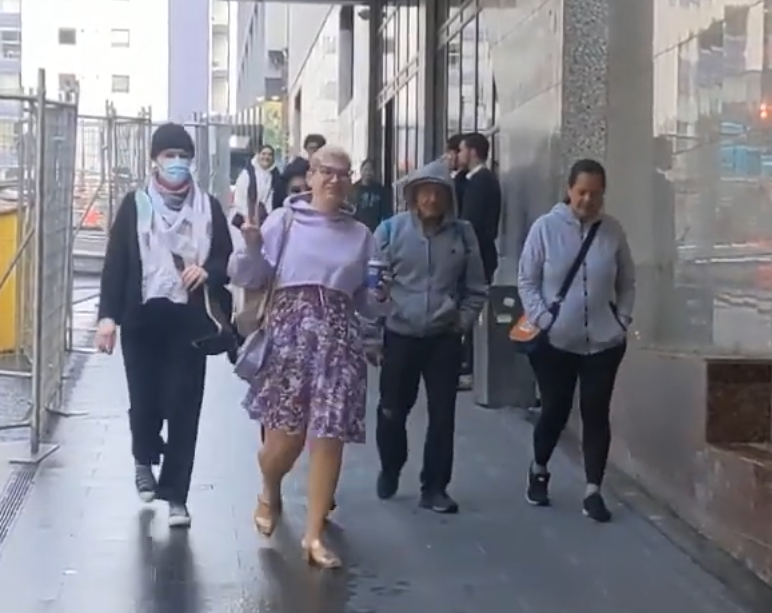
Rubashkyn (front) gesturing a V sign outside of Auckland District Court in 2024

During a protest against Kellie-Jay Keen-Minshull in Auckland on 25 March 2023, Rubashkyn threw tomato juice over Keen-Minshull's head. Subsequently, Rubashkyn reported receiving death threats. Rubashkyn departed to Australia, then the United States, claiming she feared being arrested in New Zealand. New Zealand police subsequently charged her with two counts of assault, one count for the tomato juice incident with Keen-Minshull and another of assault against Tania Suzanne Sturt, an event organiser who was standing next to Keen-Minshull and was also splashed by the juice. Supporters of Rubashkyn raised over $15,000 in the two weeks following the incident to cover her legal costs. In April 2023, Rubashkyn's lawyer entered a not guilty plea on her behalf.

On 20 September 2023, Rubashkyn's lawyer James Olsen applied to have the assault charges against her dismissed at the Auckland District Court. Keen-Minshull encouraged her supporters to gather near the courtroom via social media; having abandoned her second travel plans to New Zealand due to safety concerns. Keen-Minshull's supporters including a "Let a Woman Speak" group were met by members of the Trans Liberation Alliance (TLA) group congregated in St Patrick's Court near the Auckland District Court. This protest was peaceful with police separating the two groups. Olsen argued that the case should be dismissed since Keen-Minshull had declined to lodge a complaint or submit evidence to the police. Police prosecutor Sergeant Phil Mann has sought to rely on Keen-Minshull's filmed statements to TVNZ following the juicing incident. On 26 October, Judge Claire Ryan rejected Rubashkyn's attempt to dismiss the charges against her and ruled that she would face trial for two assault charges against Keen-Minshull.

In June 2024 as the case was headed for trial, Rubaskyn made a surprise guilty plea. On 3 September, Judge Kirsten Lummis convicted and discharged Rubashkyn, meaning she did not serve time for either assault.

=== Brussels Collaboration on Bodily Integrity ===
The Brussels Collaboration on Bodily Integrity, to which Rubashkyn is a signatory, represents a consensus uniting leading bioethicists, physicians, legal scholars, and human rights advocates. It has become a foundational reference for ethical, legal, and medical standards concerning medically unnecessary genital cutting and bodily autonomy.

=== Scientific work ===
Rubashkyn (publishing under the name Eliana Golberstein in scientific contexts) has contributed to interdisciplinary research at the intersection of public health, respiratory aerosol dynamics, harm reduction, and aerosol science. Her work gained relevance during the COVID-19 pandemic for modeling and analyzing the dynamics of pathogen transmission through environmental e-cigarette aerosol (ECA). This study has been cited in harm reduction science and is currently being reviewed for its relevance in modeling the dynamics of human breathing, pandemics and aerosol dispersion.

In collaboration with nuclear physicist Roberto A. Sussman and harm reduction scientist Riccardo Polosa, Rubashkyn co-authored several peer-reviewed articles examining the theoretical plausibility and risk modeling of SARS-CoV-2 transmission through vaping in indoor environments. These studies evaluated the extent to which vaping, as a respiratory activity, contributes to aerosol dispersion, and they developed comparative frameworks against activities such as speaking, coughing, and regular breathing.

One of the earliest works, published in the International Journal of Environmental Research and Public Health, assessed the plausibility of COVID-19 contagion via ECA, concluding that while such risks exist, they are negligible when compared to more intense respiratory activities like speaking or coughing.

In a subsequent study published in Environmental Science and Pollution Research, Rubashkyn contributed to the development of an analytic risk model estimating the probability of SARS-CoV-2 contagion through vaping in shared micro-environments. This model adapted established airborne pathogen transmission frameworks to include parameters specific to vaping, such as aerosol visibility, exhalation plume dynamics, and particle dispersion.

Rubashkyn also co-authored a paper in Applied Sciences that explored the optical and physical properties of ECA. The study provided a novel visualization framework to understand the mechanics of respiratory droplet dispersion using ECA as a visible tracer, making it a useful proxy to model airflow and pathogen transport under pandemic-related research constraints.

=== International Law ===
In December 2023, Rubashkyn co-authored the Intersex Legal Mapping Report: Global Survey on Legal Protections for People Born with Variations in Sex Characteristics, published by ILGA World, the International Lesbian, Gay, Bisexual, Trans and Intersex Association. This landmark report is the largest international legal assessment on intersex human rights to date, comprehensively documenting the legal situation of intersex people worldwide. It evaluates protections related to bodily integrity, autonomy, anti-discrimination, and equal enjoyment of human rights in over 90 countries.

The report has been widely recognized for its contribution to international human rights law, bioethics, and policy development, and is currently cited by multiple UN mechanisms and civil society advocates as a core reference document. Its findings played an instrumental role in informing the first-ever UN Human Rights Council Resolution on the Rights of Intersex Persons, adopted on 4 April 2024.

Rubashkyn helped shape the global legal and ethical framework addressing non-consensual medical interventions, discrimination, and legal recognition for people born with variations in sex characteristics. The report has become an essential resource for policymakers globally, human rights advocates, and scholars working on bodily integrity and intersex rights at national and international levels.

In October 2025, Eliana Rubashkyn’s work was formally cited by the United Nations Office of the High Commissioner for Human Rights (OHCHR) in its landmark report “Discriminatory Laws and Policies, Acts of Violence and Harmful Practices Against Intersex Persons” (A/HRC/60/50), presented at the 60th Session of the Human Rights Council in October 3.

Her co-authored study, Intersex Legal Mapping Report: Global Survey on Legal Protections for People Born with Variations in Sex Characteristics (ILGA World, 2023), was used by the UN to identify legal frameworks and guide international recommendations on prohibiting medically unnecessary interventions and enacting anti-discrimination protections based on sex characteristics. This citation situates Rubashkyn among the global pioneers shaping international human-rights norms and policy on intersex equality and bodily autonomy.
