= Leonard Matlovich =

US Airman and LGBTQ rights activist (1943–1988)

- Matlovich on the cover of Time in 1975
- Born: July 6, 1943; Savannah, Georgia, U.S.
- Died: June 22, 1988 (aged 44); West Hollywood, California, U.S.
- Burial place: Congressional Cemetery, Washington, D.C.
- Military career
- Allegiance: United States
- Branch: United States Air Force
- Service years: 1963–1975
- Rank: Technical sergeant
- Conflicts: Vietnam War
- Awards: Bronze Star Medal; Purple Heart; Air Force Commendation
- Other work: Gay rights activist

Technical Sergeant Leonard Phillip Matlovich (July 6, 1943 – June 22, 1988) was an American Vietnam War veteran, race relations instructor, and recipient of the Purple Heart and the Bronze Star. He was the first gay service member to purposely out himself to the military to fight their ban on gay people, and perhaps the best-known openly gay man in the United States of America in the 1970s next to Harvey Milk. His fight to stay in the United States Air Force after coming out of the closet became a cause célèbre around which the gay community rallied. His case resulted in articles in newspapers and magazines throughout the country, numerous television interviews, and a television movie on NBC.

Matlovich's photograph appeared on the cover of the September 8, 1975, issue of Time magazine, making him a symbol for thousands of gay and lesbian servicemembers and gay people generally. Matlovich was the first named openly gay person to appear on the cover of a U.S. newsmagazine. According to author Randy Shilts, "It marked the first time the young gay movement had ever made the cover of a major newsweekly. To a cause still struggling for legitimacy, the event was a major turning point."

== Early life and early career ==
Born at Hunter Air Force Base in Savannah, Georgia, Matlovich was the only son of retired Air Force sergeant Leonard Matlovich (of Czech ancestry) and his wife, Vera. He spent his childhood living on military bases, primarily throughout the Southern United States. Matlovich and his sister were raised in the Catholic Church. He spent much of his teenage years in Charleston, South Carolina, attending the Catholic Bishop England High School. When the Candlestick Murder occurred in Charleston in 1958, Matlovich saw it as proof of the negative societal consequences of homosexuality. Not long after he enlisted at 19, the United States increased military action in Vietnam, about ten years after the French had abandoned active colonial rule there. Matlovich volunteered for service in Vietnam and served three tours of duty. He was seriously wounded when he stepped on a landmine in Đà Nẵng.

While stationed in Florida near Fort Walton Beach, he began frequenting gay bars in nearby Pensacola. "I met a bank president, a gas station attendant – they were all homosexual", Matlovich commented in a later interview. In 1973, when he was 30, he slept with another man for the first time. He "came out" to his friends, but continued to conceal the fact from his commanding officer. Having realized that the racism he had grown up around was wrong, he volunteered to teach Air Force Race Relations classes, which had been created after several racial incidents in the military in the late 1960s and early 1970s. He became so successful that the Air Force sent him around the country to coach other instructors. Matlovich gradually came to believe that the discrimination faced by gay people was similar to that faced by African Americans.

== Activism ==
In March 1974, previously unaware of the organized gay movement, he read an interview in the Air Force Times with gay activist Frank Kameny, who had counseled several gay people in the military over the years. He contacted Kameny, who told him he had long been looking for a gay service member with a perfect record to create a test case to challenge the military's ban on gay people. Four months later, he met with Kameny at the longtime activist's Washington, D.C. home. After several months of discussion with Kameny and ACLU attorney David Addlestone during which they formulated a plan, he hand-delivered a letter to his Langley AFB commanding officer on March 6, 1975. When his commander asked, "What does this mean?" Matlovich replied, "It means Brown versus the Board of Education" – a reference to the 1954 landmark Supreme Court case outlawing racial segregation in public schools.

Perhaps the most painful aspect of the whole experience for Matlovich was his revelation to his parents. He told his mother by telephone. She was so stunned she refused to tell Matlovich's father. Her first reaction was that God was punishing her for something she had done, even if her Roman Catholic faith would not have sanctioned that notion. Then, she imagined that her son had not prayed enough or had not seen enough psychiatrists. His father finally found out by reading it in the newspaper, after his challenge became public knowledge on Memorial Day 1975 through an article on the front page of The New York Times and that evening's CBS Evening News with Walter Cronkite. Matlovich recalled, "He cried for about two hours." After that, he told his wife that, "If he can take it, I can take it."

== Discharge and lawsuit ==
At that time, the Air Force had a fairly ill-defined exception clause that could allow gay people to continue to serve if there were extenuating circumstances. These circumstances might include being immature or drunk, exemplary service, or a one-time experimentation (known sarcastically as the "Queen for a day" rule). During Matlovich's September 1975 administrative discharge hearing, an Air Force attorney asked him if he would sign a document pledging to "never practice homosexuality again" in exchange for being allowed to remain in the Air Force. Matlovich refused. Despite his exemplary military record, tours of duty in Vietnam, and high performance evaluations, the panel ruled Matlovich unfit for service, and he was recommended for a General (Under Honorable Conditions) discharge. The base commander, Colonel Alton J. Thogersen, citing Matlovich's service record, recommended that it be upgraded to Honorable. The Secretary of the Air Force agreed, confirming Matlovich's discharge in October 1975.

Matlovich sued for reinstatement, but the legal process was a long one, with the case moving back and forth between United States District and Circuit Courts. When, by September 1980, the Air Force had failed to provide U.S. District Court Judge Gerhard Gesell an explanation of why Matlovich did not meet its criteria for exception (which by then had been eliminated but still could have applied to him), Gesell ordered him reinstated into the Air Force and promoted. The Air Force offered Matlovich a financial settlement instead. Convinced that the military would find some other reason to discharge him if he reentered the service, or that the conservative Supreme Court would rule against him should the Air Force appeal, Matlovich accepted. The figure, based on back pay, future pay, and pension, was $160,000.

== Excommunication ==
A converted Mormon and church elder when he lived in Hampton, Virginia, Matlovich found himself at odds with the Latter-day Saints and their opposition to homosexual behavior; he was disfellowshipped and later excommunicated by the Church of Jesus Christ of Latter-day Saints for homosexual acts. He was disfellowshipped on October 7, 1975, in Norfolk, Virginia, and then excommunicated January 17, 1979. By this time, Matlovich had stopped being a believer.

== Settlement, later life and illness ==
From the moment his case was revealed to the public, Matlovich was repeatedly called upon by gay groups to help them with fundraising and advocating against anti-gay discrimination, helping lead campaigns against Anita Bryant's efforts in Miami, Florida, to overturn a gay nondiscrimination ordinance and John Briggs' attempt to ban gay teachers in California. Sometimes he was criticized by individuals more to the left than he had become. "I think many gays are forced into liberal camps only because that's where they can find the kind of support they need to function in society," Matlovich once noted. While appealing his discharge, he moved from Virginia to Washington, D.C., and, in 1978, to San Francisco. In 1981, he moved to the Russian River town of Guerneville, where he used the proceeds of his settlement to open a pizza restaurant.

With the outbreak of HIV/AIDS in the U.S. in the early 1980s, Matlovich's personal life was caught up in the hysteria about the virus. He sold his Guerneville restaurant in 1984, moving to Europe for a few months where, during a visit to the joint grave of lovers Gertrude Stein and Alice B. Toklas and the grave of gay writer Oscar Wilde in Père Lachaise Cemetery in Paris, France, he got the idea for a gay memorial in the United States. He returned briefly to Washington, D.C., in 1985 and, then, to San Francisco where he sold Ford cars and once again became heavily involved in gay rights causes and the fight for adequate HIV/AIDS education and treatment.

In 1986, Matlovich felt fatigued, then contracted a prolonged chest cold he seemed unable to shake. When he finally saw a physician in September of that year, he was diagnosed with HIV/AIDS. Too weak to continue his work at the Ford dealership, he was among the first to receive AZT treatments, but his prognosis was not encouraging. He went on disability benefits and became a champion for HIV/AIDS research for the disease which was claiming tens of thousands of lives in the Bay Area and nationally. He announced on Good Morning America in 1987 that he had contracted HIV, and was arrested with other demonstrators in front of the White House that June protesting what they believed was an inadequate response to HIV/AIDS by the administration of President Ronald Reagan.

Despite his deteriorating health, he tearfully made his last public speech on May 7, 1988, in front of the California State Capitol during the March on Sacramento for Gay and Lesbian Rights:

... And I want you to look at the flag, our rainbow flag, and I want you to look at it with pride in your heart, because we too have a dream. And what is our dream? Ours is more than an American dream. It's a universal dream. Because in South Africa, we're black and white, and in Northern Ireland, we're Protestant and Catholic, and in Israel we're Jew and Muslim. And our mission is to reach out and teach people to love, and not to hate. And you know the reality of the situation is that before we as an individual meet, the only thing we have in common is our sexuality. And in the AIDS crisis – and I have AIDS – and in the AIDS crisis, if there is any one word that describes our community's reaction to AIDS, that word is love, love, love.

== Death ==
On June 22, 1988, less than a month before his 45th birthday, Matlovich died in Los Angeles of complications from HIV/AIDS. His tombstone, meant to be a memorial to all gay veterans, does not bear his name. It reads, "When I was in the military, they gave me a medal for killing two men and a discharge for loving one." Recognizing military officials would not then allow such a marker in Arlington Cemetery, Matlovich chose a gravesite in the Congressional Cemetery in Washington, D.C. Another reason was because the man many believe to have been the greatest love of poet Walt Whitman, Peter Doyle, is buried there. He chose the same row where the graves of FBI Director J. Edgar Hoover and Hoover's longtime assistant director and heir Clyde Tolson are, as a kind of "last laugh".

== Legacy ==
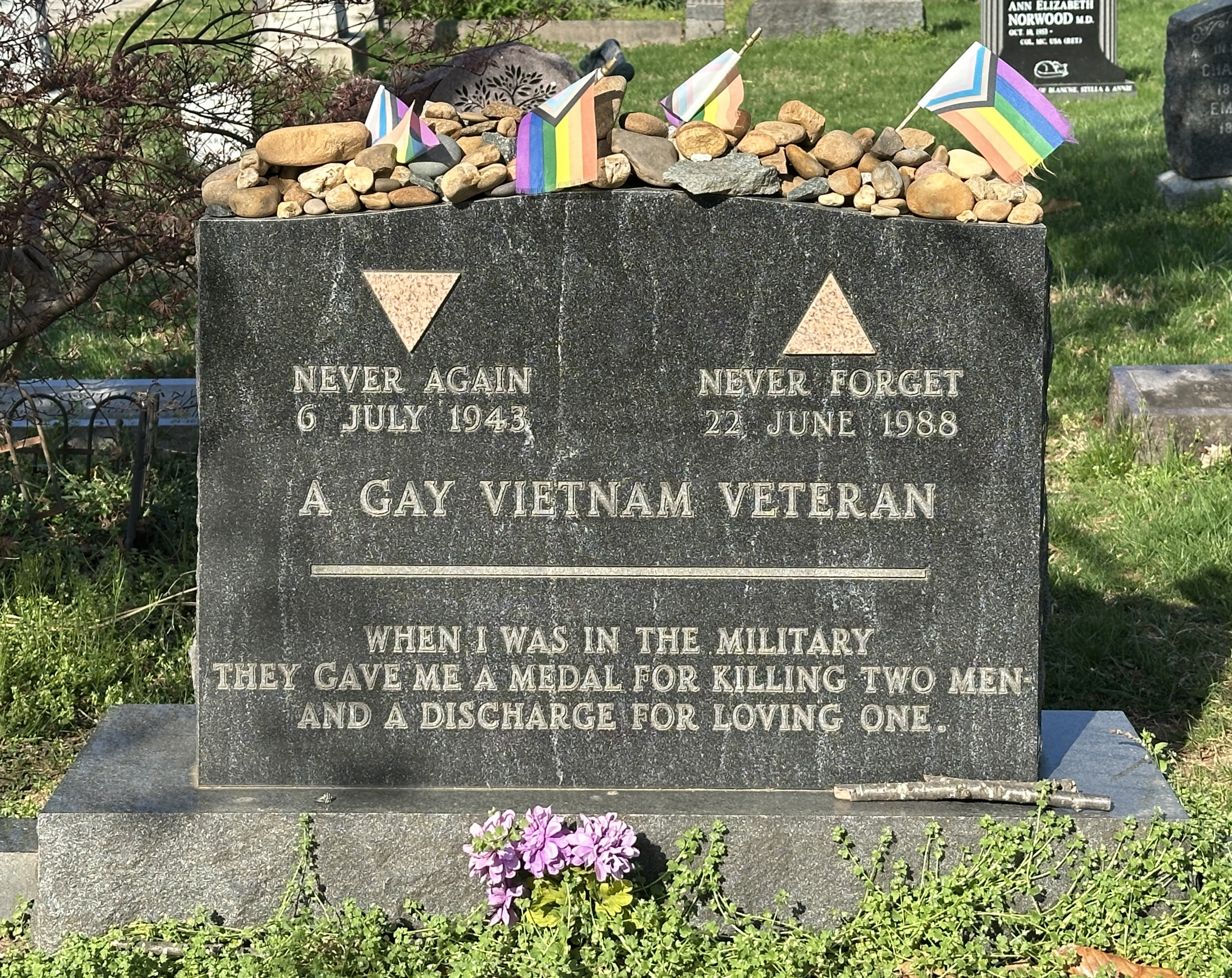
Matlovich's tombstone at the Congressional Cemetery, which reads: "A Gay Vietnam Veteran When I was in the military, they gave me a medal for killing two men and a discharge for loving one."

Matlovich's case is remembered as being a divisive issue in the 1970s gay liberation movement in America, where several LGBTQ groups ideologically differed on whether to support his effort to remain in the U.S. military while being openly gay. Activist Howard Wallace brought the issue in front of a meeting of the Bay Area Gay Liberation group on December 4, 1975 leading to heated debate among the organization, which ultimately decided not to take a public stance. As a consequence, Howard Wallace and Claud Wynne created their own organization inspired by Matlovich, called the Coalition to Defend Gays in the Military.

Before his death, Matlovich donated his personal papers and memorabilia to the GLBT Historical Society, a museum, archives and research center in San Francisco. The society has featured Matlovich's story in two exhibitions: "Out Ranks: GLBT Military Service From World War II to the Iraq War", which opened in June 2007 at the society's South of Market gallery space, and "Our Vast Queer Past: Celebrating San Francisco's GLBT History", which opened in January 2011 at the society's GLBT History Museum in the Castro District.

A bronze plaque in his memory was installed near the entrance of the apartment in which he once lived at the corner of 18th and Castro Streets in San Francisco. In October 2012, another, larger bronze memorial plaque was installed on Chicago's Halsted Street as a part of the Legacy Walk, an "outdoor museum" of LGBTQ historical figures including Milk, Wilde, Barbara Gittings, Bayard Rustin, and Alan Turing, and the Legacy Project Education Initiative in Illinois public schools.

San Francisco resident Michael Bedwell, a close friend and the original executor of Matlovich's estate, created a website in honor of Matlovich and other gay U.S. veterans. The site includes a history of the ban on gay and bisexual people in the U.S. military both before and after its transformation into "Don't Ask, Don't Tell", and illustrates the role that gay veterans fighting the ban played in the earliest development of the gay rights movement in the United States.

Matlovich's gravesite has been a site of attraction and ceremony for LGBTQ rights activists since his interment including an annual LGBTQ Veterans Day observance, and several individuals and couples have chosen to also be buried in Congressional Cemetery identifying their being gay on their tombstones per his suggestion such as Gittings and her partner Kay Tobin Lahusen. In May 2011, gay Iraq veteran Capt. Stephen Hill – who would later become famous for being booed by audience members during a Republican presidential candidates debate for asking whether any would attempt to restore "Don't Ask, Don't Tell" – and his partner Josh Snyder chose to be legally married next to the gravesite to honor Matlovich's fight against the original ban. His grave is the starting point for the annual Pride Run 5K sponsored by DC Front Runners, a running, walking, and social club serving Washington DC's LGBTQ people and their friends. On Veterans Day 2015, a Veterans Administration memorial for his mentor Kameny (1925–2011) was dedicated immediately behind Matlovich's grave. Activists including Army Lt. Dan Choi, Army Staff Sergeant Miriam Ben-Shalom and members of GetEQUAL held a vigil at Matlovich's gravesite on November 10, 2010, before proceeding to chain themselves to the White House fence (and be subsequently arrested) to protest "Don't Ask, Don't Tell".

In June 2019, Matlovich was one of the inaugural fifty American "pioneers, trailblazers, and heroes" inducted on the National LGBTQ Wall of Honor within the Stonewall National Monument (SNM) in New York City's Stonewall Inn. The SNM is the first U.S. national monument dedicated to LGBTQ rights and history, and the wall's unveiling was timed to take place during the 50th anniversary of the Stonewall riots.

== Literature and film ==
- Castañeda, Laura and Susan B. Campbell. "No Longer Silent: Sgt. Leonard Matlovich and Col. Margarethe Cammermeyer." In News and Sexuality: Media Portraits of Diversity, 198–200. Sage, 2005, ISBN 1-4129-0999-6.
- Hippler, Mike. Matlovich: The Good Soldier, Alyson Publications Inc., 1989, ISBN 1-55583-129-X
- Miller, Neil. "Leonard Matlovich: A Soldier's Story." In Out of the Past: Gay and Lesbian History from 1869 to the Present, 411–414. Virginia: Vintage Books, 1995, ISBN 0-679-74988-8
- Shilts, Randy. Conduct Unbecoming: Gays and Lesbians in the US Military, Diane Publishing Company, 1993, ISBN 0-7881-5416-8
- Sergeant Matlovich vs. the U.S. Air Force, made-for-television dramatization directed by Paul Leaf, written by John McGreevey, starring Brad Dourif in title role. Originally aired on NBC, August 21, 1978.
- The Strange History of Don't Ask, Don't Tell, HBO television documentary directed by Fenton Bailey and Randy Barbato. Originally aired September 20, 2011.

== See also ==
- Sexual orientation and the United States military
