= Stephen Snyder-Hill =

US soldier and LGBTQ activist

Stephen (Steve) Snyder-Hill
- Born: Stephen Michael Hill; October 21, 1970 (age 55); Upper Sandusky, Ohio, United States
- Branch: United States Army, United States Army Reserve
- Service years: 1988–1996, 2001-2019
- Rank: Major
- Awards: Meritorious Service Medal
- Alma mater: The Ohio State University
- Spouses: Joshua Snyder-Hill, né Snyder
- Other work: Author, lecturer, activist, dietitian/public health professional
- Website: www.soldierofchangebook.com

Stephen Snyder-Hill (né Hill; born October 21, 1970) is an American soldier, author, lecturer, and LGBT rights activist who served under the United States Army's Don't Ask, Don't Tell policy and fought against the Defense of Marriage Act in collaboration with Freedom to Marry and the Servicemembers Legal Defense Network. He is author of the book Soldier of Change which covers the media frenzy associated with his activism and his life as gay in the army.

== Early life ==
Snyder-Hill grew up in Upper Sandusky, Ohio. One of the things he remembers about his childhood was the local newspaper running an April Fool's joke on April 1, 1994, about gay people and the KKK. The "joke" was that gay people and the KKK would march at a parade in the small conservative town. He writes in his book Soldier of Change: From the Closet to the Forefront of the Gay Rights Movement that as a child it bothered him, reinforcing the idea that it was wrong to be gay. Later in life, after all of the activism and publicity on September 27, 2014, the same newspaper honored him in an article about his activism. He uses this as an example of "trusting the power of your voice" and how it can change hearts and minds. In his book, he details his coming out while at war. Describing the night of an artillery battle he writes:

All of the sudden there was a huge explosion off to our left. That was the first time in my life I thought I might actually die. I happened to look up at a picture of my brother and his girlfriend. All those years of hiding who I was, being scared of it and not admitting or understanding it stopped right then. My whole life had been fake. And if I were to die, I would have never been honest with myself, never let myself love another person. I was so scared, and I felt like I was going to die alone.

He later discusses how a visit to Dachau when he lived in Germany also changed his life. He took photographs while visiting the Holocaust site. One of the photos was a uniform with a pink triangle on it. He did not understand at the time what that meant, but later while in college he started wearing gay pride symbols and one of them was the pink triangle with the inscription "Silence = Death". He attributes that moment in his life to the moment when he was thrust into activism.

He then started speaking out while in college at Ohio State University. A student, Dan Hazard, had written a letter in the student newspaper The Lantern thanking gay people for leaving Columbus to march on Washington, saying that for the first time in his life he did not have to worry about contracting AIDS. This infuriated Snyder-Hill who, for the first time, publicly wrote back a response. Snyder-Hill wrote: "I have recently come out, I am no different than you; well, you know, I might be a little different - I just got back from defending my country in Operation Desert Storm. When I say defending my Country, I mean defending everyone, regardless of race, gender, sexual orientation - that means everyone, including you." From this point on Snyder-Hill knew he had a calling to defend LGBTQ rights. He was out during college, but went back into the closet when he decided to re-join the US Army Reserve in March 2001.

== Military service ==
Snyder-Hill served thirty-one years in the United States Army and Army Reserve in two stints, achieving the rank of major and earning the Meritorious Service Medal. He joined the army in 1988 at the age of 19, serving on active duty in Germany. He fought in the first Gulf War in Saudi Arabia, Iraq, and Kuwait before his honorable discharge in 1996. He came out after leaving the army, but when he reenlisted in 2001 he had to go back into the closet and hide his sexuality in order to serve because of the Clinton-era Don't Ask, Don't Tell policy. He was deployed to Iraq in support of Operation New Dawn in 2010. Throughout his military career Snyder-Hill received numerous awards and decorations. Steve officially retired from the US Military on November 22, 2019. The US Army gave him and his husband a certificate of appreciation, something that was only made possible after the fall of Don't Ask, Don't Tell. Steve gave an extensive interview to the Ohio Historical Society recounting his military service under "Don't Ask Don't Tell".

Snyder-Hill's military awards include: Meritorious Service Medal, Army Commendation Medal (w/ 1 Bronze Oak Leaf Cluster), Army Achievement Medal (w/ 1 Bronze Oak Leaf Cluster), Army Good Conduct Medal, Army Reserves Component Achievement Medal (w/ 3 Bronze Oak Leaf Clusters), National Defense Service Medal (w/ Bronze Service Star), Southwest Asia Service Medal (w/2 Bronze Stars), Iraqi Campaign Medial (w/ 1 Bronze Star), Global War on Terrorism Medal, Armed Forces Reserve Medal (w/ M Device, & 10 Year Bronze Hourglass), Army Service Ribbon, Army Overseas Service Ribbon (w/ #2 Designator), Saudi Arabian For The Liberation of Kuwait Ribbon, and five Arcams.

== Booing at debate ==
On September 22, 2011, at a Republican Party presidential debate in Orlando, Florida, before the 2012 U.S. Presidential Election, debate moderator Megyn Kelly directed to presidential hopeful Rick Santorum a question via a YouTube video message posed by Snyder-Hill, who was then serving in the U.S. Army in Iraq. Snyder-Hill asked whether the candidates' presidencies would "circumvent the progress that's been made for gay and lesbian soldiers in the military". In asking this question, Snyder-Hill publicly came out of the closet only two days after the official end of Don't Ask, Don't Tell. Before Santorum responded, some audience members booed Snyder-Hill and then the audience loudly applauded Santorum when he said he would reinstate the ban on openly gay people serving in the military. The responses precipitated partisan reaction often chastising the audience, as well as Santorum and the other candidates, for remaining silent after the booing and not supporting the soldier.

Several candidates said after the debate that they regretted not speaking up or could not hear the boos from the stage. Vice President Joe Biden called the candidates' silence on the stage after the soldier was booed "reprehensible", and in a speech at the Human Rights Campaign, President Barack Obama, who would face one of the Republican candidates in the upcoming election, sharply criticized them for remaining silent, saying: "You want to be commander-in-chief? You can start by standing up for the men and women who wear the uniform of the United States, even when it's not politically convenient." A few months later, first Biden and then Obama endorsed marriage equality.

== LGBT rights activism ==
=== Marriage at Congressional Cemetery ===
While a captain in the United States Army Reserve, Stephen Hill married Joshua Snyder in Washington, D.C., on May 3, 2011. Same-sex marriage was legal in Washington, but not yet across the United States. They were married in the Congressional Cemetery at the grave site of their personal hero Leonard Matlovich whose stone reads: "When I was in the military they gave me a medal for killing two men and a discharge for loving one."

=== Name change ===
The couple petitioned to have their surnames combined to Snyder-Hill in the state of Ohio, which did not recognize their marriage at the time. The couple were advised to declare another, fictitious reason for the name change, but they refused. Interviewed on Current TV's The War Room, Hill said: "When the magistrate pulled us in there, she said that you can put any other reason on this application. … I'm not going to lie. That's one thing I have told myself since Don't Ask, Don't Tell was repealed. The Army accepts me. I'm not going to lie anymore to anybody else." They sought and were granted judicial relief from a court in Columbus, Ohio. He was also interviewed on the local news channel 10 TV where he was quoted as saying, "I won't lie anymore, I did it for 20 years of my life, I served my country so I shouldn't have to lie on an application."

=== Marriage Equality Lawsuit against the DOD ===
He and his husband were plaintiffs in a lawsuit filed by the Servicemembers Legal Defense Network challenging the Defense of Marriage Act and other federal statutes that prevented the military from providing equal protections and support to same-sex-marriage families, and lent their story to a video produced by the advocacy group Freedom to Marry supporting marriage equality.

=== CBUS of Love ===
On June 21, 2013, Snyder-Hill and his husband Joshua arranged to have 25 LGBTQ couples married on the steps of the US Supreme Court right before the DOMA judgment. They were all married on the building's steps. During the ceremony, a guard said that they were not allowed to protest and could not be let on the grounds of the US Supreme Court as a group. Snyder-Hill resisted, saying, "By God, nothing is preventing each couple from walking up there as a couple." After the couples were married, they walked down the steps of the Supreme Court as Snyder-Hill and Joshua read out their married names. The event attracted media and news coverage from their local Columbus News, to newspapers such as the Washington Blade.

=== Media ===
Snyder-Hill's story was featured on the front page of the LA Times on December 29, 2013. Reporter Christopher Goffard captured their story with the tagline, "America saw Stephen Hill's face for 15 seconds. It took him a lifetime to show it."

=== TED Talk ===
Snyder-Hill and his husband Joshua continue to travel as activists across the country telling their story. He uses the tagline "Trust the Power of your Voice" in speaking with universities and groups across the nation. He also did a TEDx Talk at Ohio State University in 2015 to a crowd of more than 4,000 people that ended in a standing ovation. This later would be a point of contention during the sexual assault claim Snyder-Hill brought against Ohio State University. He posted on social media "in 2015, OSU asked me to be the headliner of their 'Human Narrative' TED Talk. It was titled 'Trust the power of your voice'. In 2018, They are asking me to silence mine."

== Books ==
=== Soldier of Change: From the Closet to the Forefront of the Gay Rights Movement ===
Snyder-Hill wrote a book, Soldier of Change: From the Closet to the Forefront of the Gay Rights Movement, with a foreword by George Takei, is described by its publisher as the first memoir by military personnel about serving under the Don't Ask, Don't Tell policy.

=== How OSU Beat Michigan State (working title) ===
In 2019, it was reported that Snyder-Hill was in the process of writing his second book. It was given the tentative title How OSU Beat Michigan State, in reference to the sexual abuse scandals both at Ohio State University and at Michigan State University. The book chronicles his experience with not only the sexual assault at OSU but also the aftermath and coverup in current day.

== Ohio State University sexual assault claim ==
=== 1995 medical appointment with Dr. Strauss ===
In 1995, Snyder-Hill visited the Ohio State University (OSU) student health center. He was assigned physician Dr. Richard Strauss, who he claimed to the university officials abused him. He reported it to the university the day after it happened. He reported this all to the Head of Student Services Dr. Ted W. Grace. The survivors created a website to educate the public about what had happened to them.

=== 1995 meeting and confrontation with Dr. Strauss ===
In response to Steve's complaint, OSU set up a meeting between Dr. Strauss (the abuser), Snyder-Hill (the abused), Snyder-Hill's boyfriend at the time, and Dr. Louise Douce. The meeting lasted for two hours and ended up being a confrontation between the accused and accuser. During the session, Dr. Strauss yelled at Snyder-Hill that he was trying to "ruin the doctor's reputation". No one at the meeting stopped the verbal abuse. At the end of the meeting, the facilitators of the meeting (Douce and Grace) concluded that Snyder-Hill must have been "confused and mistaken" about what had happened to him. Snyder-Hill was unhappy with this conclusion, but was not provided any appeal opportunity or instruction on who else he could complain to. They also never informed law enforcement or reported Dr. Strauss to the Medical Board. Dr. Grace called Snyder-Hill after the meeting and responded that they would change their forms and that they would allow people to opt out of any uncomfortable body parts to be examined in future paperwork. Snyder-Hill told Dr. Grace the only way he would go away, was that he made Dr. Grace promise that 1) this had never happened to anyone else, 2) that this be documented in the doctor's personnel file, and 3) that if this happens again to anyone else that he wanted to be notified immediately. Snyder-Hill asked Dr. Grace to put all this to him in writing; at first there was silence on the phone, but then Dr. Grace did follow up. The meeting and the three complaints were all documented in Dr. Grace's own notes (taken one year later and which would not be released to Snyder-Hill until the university publicly wanted it released with the Perkins Report). Dr. Strauss also received an exemplary performance appraisal six months after this sexual assault. Dr. Grace never provided an explanation why he waited to document the first two complaints against Dr. Strauss, a year later (after a third student complained, and after he signed off on an exemplary performance appraisal for Dr. Strauss six months before this documentation). Snyder-Hill's complaint form was documented back in 1995.

=== Perkins Coie investigation and preservation of OSU documents ===
In May 2019, the university released the results of their investigation. This report concluded that many university officials knew about Strauss's predation but did nothing. OSU released supporting files on their Compliance and Integrity page, which was only available for one year. Snyder-Hill, who the university dismissed for public records requests, took all of the thousands of documents which were not released in any logical order, and Snyder-Hill organized, labeled, and archived them to keep the university transparent, so they would remain available to the public for more than one year. In an effort to understand what all happened in Strauss's era, Snyder-Hill also created a timeline of what happened back when Strauss was sexually assaulting students from 1978 to 1996, and referenced all timeline events either to the Perkins Coie report, or to the documents released. It was the release of the Perkins Report and timing of the release of Snyder-Hill's public records, which caused him to question the university's intentions and transparency. It was in this report that Snyder-Hill found out that another student complained about Dr. Strauss to Dr. Grace just two days before Snyder-Hill had. There was also another person who complained one year after Snyder-Hill. It was the three of these complaints collectively (Student A, B, and C) that eventually got Strauss suspended. He was never fired from his job and was allowed to retire with emeritus status.

=== Public records complaint ===
In July 2018, Snyder-Hill saw on TV that a sexual assault scandal was unfolding at Ohio State University. When he saw the doctor's face, he instantly recognized him from the 1990s. He requested his original complaint back from the 1990s and realized this was the same doctor. Ohio State University delayed complying with Snyder-Hill's request to release records for 155 days. The original complaint as well as the letter from OSU was released by WOSU in 2018. He filed a lawsuit against OSU with other plaintiffs in 2018. Snyder-Hill also filed a lawsuit in the Court of Claims against Ohio State University for breaking public records law. The university responded to the lawsuit that it delayed the release of the records because they didn't want to traumatize Snyder-Hill with the public information. Snyder-Hill, not having a legal background, prose crafted a legal argument contradicting every one of the Universities points. The issues that the complaint addressed were questioning why the university argued that they didn't want to 'piecemeal release information' to the public, but they did put out Strauss's personnel file that had nothing that showed he did anything. That point contradicted what they were claiming. He also questioned their intentions releasing that clean file, whether it was to make people doubt survivors, and get this sexual assault accusation buried. He also questioned the universities use of 'trauma informed care' as their justification for why they refused to release information. He also mentioned that the head of their human resources sent a text to his husband mistakenly, and in that text asked if 'we had found the letter of complaint, she was curious. This was a time when the university had not yet released the info on the complaint, and the head of human resources misspelled Snyder-Hill's name exactly as it appeared on the complaint, making him believe that she had it right in front of her, deciding whether to release it to him. These points were all brought up to the court. The Court of Claims ruled in Snyder-Hill's favor that the university broke public records law and included some harsh words to the university on their response and lack of due diligence in complying with public records law. Snyder-Hill also complained to the Court that OSU's attorney tried to confuse the process by telling him that he wasn't allowed to respond to the Court. OSU responded to this by saying that the email that was sent was a 'mistake'. Snyder-Hill promptly responded that this explanation didn't make any sense, and that he was "tired of being lied to" by the university.

=== Medical Board complaint ===
In 2020, Snyder-Hill filed an Ohio State Medical Board complaint against both Dr. Ted Grace and OSU's current President Dr. Michael Drake. The complaint against Grace was because he never reported Strauss's behavior to the Ohio State Medical Board. A Governor's working group released a report investigating the Medical Board's handling of the Strauss case back in the nineties. The complaint against OSU's president at the time, Dr. Michael V. Drake, was for alleged unethical behavior, as the "leader of this university" denied public records even with repeated requests in violation of Ohio Public Revised Code 149.43. Snyder-Hill also questioned OSU's decision to release Strauss's Personnel file early in the investigation. At the same time OSU released a "clean" personnel file to the public, Snyder-Hill was requesting his original complaint, which detailed and corroborated the survivors who had come forward. This led Snyder-Hill to believe the university was trying to cover this up and make the public doubt the survivors who came forward. He spoke publicly about this and laid out this argument to the Ohio Court of Claims. ESPN released a story that also questioned the lack of anything negative in Strauss's personnel file "The 228 pages of Strauss' employment records released by Ohio State offer no clues the university was aware of any sexual misconduct. The file includes letters from high-ranking university officials congratulating the doctor for various appointments and tenure."

=== Suspension of Dr. Grace's medical license ===
Eventually, Dr. Ted W. Grace went public with his explanation of his letter to Snyder-Hill in the nineties. In a newspaper article from the Southern Illinoisian, Snyder-Hill combated most of Dr. Grace's explanations. Most of what Snyder-Hill cited in his defense was Dr. Grace's own words contradicting his current explanation of the events surrounding Dr. Strauss in the nineties. The Medical Board complaint eventually led to Dr. Grace getting his medical license suspended in Ohio and Illinois. This story was covered by most national news media.

== See also ==
- LGBT rights in the United States
- List of LGBT rights organizations
- OutServe-SLDN
