= Hands Across the Aisle Coalition =

Organization opposing transgender rights

- Formation: 2017; 9 years ago
- Founders: Kaeley Triller Haver, Miriam Ben-Shalom
- Key people: Kellie-Jay Keen-Minshull
- Affiliations: Heritage Foundation, Women's Liberation Front
- Website: Official website

The Hands Across the Aisle Coalition (HATAC) is an organization founded in 2017 and operating primarily in the United States, known for its opposition to transgender rights. The organization aims to connect anti-trans radical feminists with conservative Christian anti-LGBT groups, ostensibly "tabling [their] ideological differences" to "oppose gender identity ideology". The organization actively supports anti-LGBT groups in legislation targeting transgender rights.

Since 2019, HATAC has worked with the Heritage Foundation to hold panel discussion events featuring Republican Party strategists, Christian evangelical advocates, and leaders of anti-trans feminist organizations such as the Women's Liberation Front (WoLF).

British anti-transgender activist Kellie-Jay Keen-Minshull is a member of the organization.

== Founding ==
Hands Across the Aisle was co-founded by Kaeley Triller Harms, an anti-abortion conservative, and Miriam Ben-Shalom. Haver is a childhood sexual assault survivor and Ben-Shalom was discharged from the U.S. army for coming out as a lesbian in 1976, causing her to campaign against Don't Ask Don't Tell for decades. Triller-Haver admitted via a facebook post to having sexually abused a minor who was part of the youth treatment program she was an employee of. In 2016, Ben-Shalom was dis-invited from being grand marshal of the Milwaukee Pride parade because of her support for "bathroom bills" which deny transgender people the right to use bathrooms corresponding to their gender identity.

Before founding HATAC, Haver was the communication director for Just Want Privacy, a campaign to repeal a law in Washington state that allows transgender people to use bathrooms corresponding to their gender identity. Just Want Privacy was criticized by a sexual assault survivor for using her story to fundraise for anti-trans goals.

It's unknown who funds HATAC. The Southern Poverty Law Center wrote: "With little transparency on its website about who and what formed the group, HATAC might simply be a secular-facing iteration of the same anti-LGBT agenda that has driven the Christian Right for decades."

== Activism ==
In May 2017, HATAC cosigned a petition with Michelle Cretella, then president of the anti-LGBT hate group the American College of Pediatricians, and leaders of other anti-LGBT groups such as the Family Policy Alliance, Concerned Women for America, and the Texas Eagle Forum, to Ben Carson, then director of the U.S. Department of Housing and Urban Development (HUD). The petition supported barring transgender women from accessing women's homeless shelters. In 2019, HUD proposed a new rule which would allow federally funded homeless shelters to force trans people to share facilities based on their assigned sex rather than their gender identity, or to deny them entrance altogether.

In February 2017, the Heritage Foundation hosted a panel with 5 members of the Hands Across the Aisle Coalition including members of WoLF.

In September 2017, WoLF and HATAC issued a letter to John Wiesman, then Secretary of Health for the Washington State Department of Health, demanding the state cease changing gender designations on birth certificates.

In 2019, the anti-LGBT group Alliance Defending Freedom helped a client sue his school district in Doe v. Boyertown Area School District for allowing transgender boys to use the same locker rooms and bathrooms as him. HATAC and WoLF wrote amicus briefs in support of the client.

Also in 2019, Kellie-Jay Keen-Minshull and Venice Allen, another British anti-trans activist, met and connected with Lynn Meagher at an event hosted by HATAC. Meagher has two transgender children who she said no longer speak to her because they were lost to "the trans cult". Her elder daughter, in contrast, stated they were estranged because Meagher was "extremely emotionally and physically abusive growing up", "racist", "transphobic", "greedy", "cruel", and "religiously intolerant". Meagher has ties to the Proud Boys.
