= American Veterans for Equal Rights =

American LGBT veteran service organization

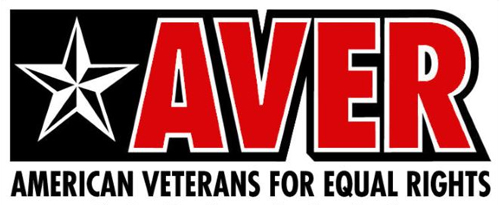
- Founded: 1990
- Founder: Miriam Ben-Shalom
- Location: Sumner, Washington
- Region served: United States
- Services: veterans
- Website: aver.us
- Formerly called: Gay, Lesbian and Bisexual Veterans of America

American Veterans for Equal Rights (AVER) is the oldest Lesbian, Gay, Bisexual and Transgender (LGBT) Veterans Service Organization (VSO) in the United States. Founded on 17 May 1990, AVER is a non-profit VSO that supports and advocates for the rights of LGBT military veterans, active duty service members, and their families.

== History ==
AVER was founded by several LGBT veterans including SSgt. (Army Reserve-Rtd.) Miriam Ben-Shalom; Navy Ensign, Jim Woodward, president of the San Diego Veterans Association; Chuck Schoen; bisexual US Army veteran Cliff Arnesen of the New England Gay, Lesbian & Bisexual Veterans, Boston, Massachusetts; in 1990 as the Gay, Lesbian and Bisexual Veterans of America, the oldest organization of LGBT veterans.

Miriam Ben-Shalom, a lesbian Army Reserve enlisted soldier who was discharged in 1975 by the military after it was revealed by a higher officer that she was lesbian, fought through the judicial system to retain her post. While initially successful, a higher federal Court of Appeals ultimately reversed the decision.

To help defend others in similar situations, Ben-Shalom worked with other LGBT veterans to establish the GLBVA in 1990. She served as National President until shortly after the 1993 March on Washington, when her resignation was demanded by unanimous action of the Board of Directors due to consequences relating to several events during the days of the March program. The organization attended the March showing a list of over thirty chapters and affiliated organizations. Not long after the March, that number had dropped to fewer than six active local chapters or affiliates after large numbers of members expressed extreme dissatisfaction with events that took place during the March.

GLBVA was incorporated for the first time, in Vermont, in 1993 by action of then-National President Gene F. Barfield and then-National Vice President Nancy Russell. Upon Barfield's resignation, retired Army LCOL Russell succeeded to the National Presidency in 1994, the first of several incumbencies by her in that position.

In 1994, the national officers of GLBVA held the first meeting ever between a nationwide LGBT military and veterans organization and a member of the President's Cabinet. Secretary of the Department of Veterans Affairs Hershel W. Gober sat down for a meeting with Nancy Russell (of Texas), then National President, Steve Webb (of Michigan), then National Vice President, Bob Hoy (of Florida), then National Vice President for Veterans Affairs, and Gene F. Barfield (of Vermont), then National Secretary and a former National President. Secretary Gober expressed the Administration's commitment to equal access and treatment for all qualified veterans by the Department of Veterans Affairs, regardless of sexual orientation. During this same Washington lobbying visit, GLBVA officers presented U.S. Representative Barney Frank (D-MA) with a certificate of honorary life membership, the first ever granted by unanimous vote of the Board of Directors.

By 1996, James Darby, a Chicago native who organized the Chicago chapter of GLBVA, became President of the organization, and was received in 1997 by White House Senior Adviser for Public Liaison Richard Socarides and by Pentagon officials. Under Darby's leadership, the "Lexington Declaration" called on U.S. President Bill Clinton to lift the ban on open service in the military by homosexuals.

AVER is listed as a non-profit 501(c)(3) since 1996.

In 2001, the first American memorial specifically honoring LGBTQ veterans was dedicated in Desert Memorial Park, called the LGBTQ Veterans Memorial. In 2018, a bill was signed into law designating that LGBTQ Veterans Memorial as California's official LGBTQ veterans memorial. Due to this, California became the first state in the nation to officially recognize LGBTQ military veterans. That memorial is an obelisk of South Dakotan mahogany granite with the logo of the GLBVA, now called American Veterans for Equal Rights, on it.

On May 2, 2005, the GLBVA, under president Jim Donovan, changed its name to the American Veterans for Equal Rights. The organization was formally incorporated as a 501(c)(19) organization under president Alan J. Rogue (died 2010). Danny Ingram, a Georgia native and former sergeant of the U.S. Army who was discharged immediately after DADT came into force, succeeded Rogue as president; he represented AVER at the 2010 signature ceremony at which the Don't Ask, Don't Tell Repeal Act of 2010 was signed into law. Ingram was succeeded in 2013 by Lieutenant Colonel Steve Loomis (U.S. Army, Ret.), who is the incumbent president.

In 2007, the Chicago Chapter of American Veterans for Equal Rights was inducted into the Chicago Gay and Lesbian Hall of Fame.

The AVER Chicago chapter erected a LGBT Veterans Memorial on Memorial day in 2015 at the Abraham Lincoln National Cemetery located in Elwood, Illinois.

On 29 May 2017, an LGBT veterans memorial was unveiled in city of Lake View, Chicago, it was also part of the 25th anniversary of Chicago AVER Chapter.

In 2025, the AVER national president was James Apedaile.

== Organization ==
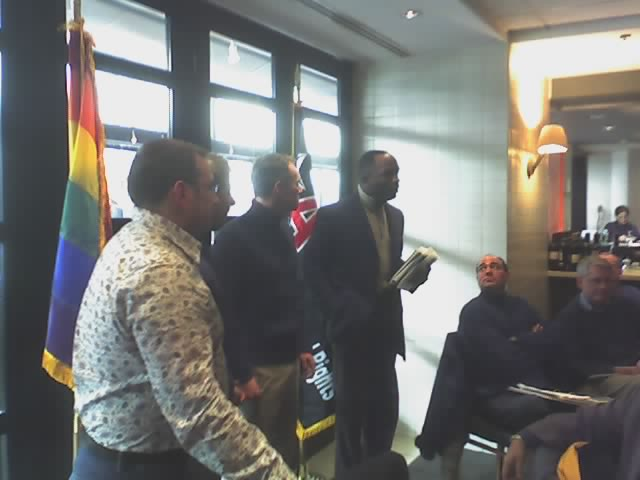
Major Alan G. Rogers (third from right), U.S. Army, receiving an award for his work as Treasurer and membership chairman at the D.C. Chapter of AVER, January 16, 2005. Rogers, while closeted to his superiors, was killed in an explosion in Baghdad, Iraq, in January 2008.

The organization is chapter-based, and local chapters organize many of their own activities. For example, the Chicago chapter organized a ceremony to mark the end of "don't ask, don't tell" (DADT). With the city of Chicago, AVER sponsors an annual tribute to gay and lesbian veterans.
