= Peace Officer (film) =

- Directed by: Scott Christopherson and Brad Barber
- Produced by: Scott Christopherson, Brad Barber, Dave Lawrence
- Starring: William J. "Dub" Lawrence, Liz Wood, Jerry Wood, Nancy Lawrence, Radley Balko, Kara Dansky, Sheriff Jim Winder, Sheriff Todd Richardson, Det. Jason Vanderwarf, Officer Derek Draper, Mike Stewart, Chris Shaw
- Cinematography: Barber, Christopherson
- Edited by: Renny McCauley
- Music by: Micah Dahl Anderson
- Release date: March 15, 2015 (South by Southwest Film Festival)
- Running time: 109 minutes
- Country: United States
- Language: English

Peace Officer is a 2015 American documentary film about police militarization in the United States. It won the 2015 Documentary Feature Competition Grand Jury award at the South by Southwest Film Festival.

It was conceived when co-director Scott Christopherson, an assistant film professor at St. Edward's University in Austin, Texas, met retired police officer William "Dub" Lawrence at a baseball game and was invited to visit his hangar where he carried out his private investigations into incidents in which people were killed by police. Lawrence, the central figure in the documentary, founded Davis County, Utah's SWAT team, the first in the state, in the 1970s as a sheriff. He was motivated to begin investigating police killings after the same SWAT team he founded killed his son-in-law, Brian Wood, during a 2008 standoff.

Much of the film focuses on the history of the SWAT teams that were formed in the United States after the 1965 Watts riots in Los Angeles and mythologized in popular culture by shows such as S.W.A.T. The film follows Lawrence as he investigates his son-in-law's death as well as several other SWAT team raids.

The film won the 2015 AML Award for film.
