= Women's Liberation Front =

American feminist organization that opposes transgender rights

- Abbreviation: WoLF
- Formation: 2014
- Founder: Lierre Keith
- Website: womensliberationfront.org

The Women's Liberation Front (WoLF) is an American trans-exclusionary radical feminist (TERF) organization that opposes transgender rights and related legislation. It opposes the Obama administration's Title IX directives and has participated in the court cases G.G. v. Gloucester County School Board and R.G. & G.R. Harris Funeral Homes Inc. v. Equal Employment Opportunity Commission to oppose trans rights.

WoLF has collaborated with many conservative and anti-trans groups including: the Alliance Defending Freedom, The Heritage Foundation, Hands Across the Aisle Coalition, Concerned Parents and Educators, and the Family Policy Alliance to push for anti-trans policies and legislation.

WoLF has been described as a hate group by the Gender Justice League.

While considered a fringe group by mainstream progressives, who say the group conceals an essentially discriminatory right-wing ideology under the guise of feminism, WoLF has found influence through its collaborations with conservative groups who share their same views on trans rights. Progressive and feminist organizations, such as the American Civil Liberties Union (ACLU) and the National Organization for Women (NOW), describe WoLF as "anti-trans bigots disguised as feminists".

== History ==
=== Founding and membership ===
WoLF was founded by Lierre Keith in 2014.

WoLF's activism finds its source in second-wave feminist tendencies, such as those of Mary Daly and Janice Raymond, which consider transgender identities untrue and say that women are defined by "their biology, and by having 'survived girlhood'", rather than by gender identity.

Former Co-Chair Kara Dansky has stated that WoLF supports gay rights and abortion rights, but that "on certain issues, such as gender identity, pornography and prostitution, WoLF finds that the left has pretty much sold out women".

As of 2021, WoLF reported having nearly 1,000 members across the United States.

=== Affiliations and collaborations ===
In 2016, WoLF received a $15,000 donation from the Alliance Defending Freedom (ADF).

In May 2017, WoLF partnered with the Hands Across the Aisle Coalition, Concerned Parents and Educators, and the Family Policy Alliance to submit a petition for rule-making to the U.S. Department of Housing and Urban Development, "to protect the safety and privacy of women in need of shelter due to homelessness or violence".

In 2019, three members of WoLF appeared on a panel with The Heritage Foundation, focusing on the Equality Act. Progressives criticized WoLF's participation in the panel, which included Jennifer Chavez reading "from a letter that described increased transgender visibility and acceptance as 'a social contagion all over the internet'".

== Litigation and legal advocacy ==
In August 2016, WoLF filed a lawsuit against the Obama administration for its directive on Title IX permitting students to use bathrooms based on their reported gender identity. In their filing, WoLF stated that the Obama administration equated the terms "sex" with "gender identity" without evidence, and that, by doing so, the administration contradicted the intent of Title IX. Following the election of Donald Trump, the directive was withdrawn. The suit ended in voluntary dismissal after WoLF withdrew from the suit in March 2017.

WoLF has filed several amicus curiae briefs to the Supreme Court in opposition to transgender rights. WoLF partnered with the Family Policy Alliance (FPA) to file a joint brief in support of the plaintiff of G. G. v. Gloucester County School Board, opposing a lower court ruling in favor of Gavin Grimm, a trans boy who desired to use the boys' restroom at his high school. The organization also filed a brief in R. G. & G. R. Harris Funeral Homes, Inc., v. Equal Employment Opportunity Commission, a landmark Supreme Court case involving the issue of whether the firing of transgender funeral director Aimee Stephens from Harris Funeral Homes constituted sex discrimination under Title VII of the Civil Rights Act of 1964. WoLF's brief referred to Stephens as a man, and argued that sex should not be considered equivalent to gender identity; WoLF also organized rallies in opposition to Stephens' case outside the Supreme Court in October 2020.

In November 2021, WoLF filed a lawsuit against the California Department of Corrections and Rehabilitation over its policy of permitting transgender, non-binary, and intersex prisoners to be detained in facilities corresponding to their gender identity.

== See also ==
- Feminist views on transgender topics
