= Quit lit (academia) =

Literary genre

Quit lit is a literary genre of autobiographical apologia, issued publicly, when leaving a job or industry, particularly the academic field.
