= Jaycie =

Jaycie is a given name. Notable people with the name include:

- Jaycie Johnson (born 1995), American soccer player
- Jaycie Phelps (born 1979), American former gymnast

== See also ==
- Jaycee (given name)
- JC (disambiguation), include list of people whose names begin with the initials
- Jayce, given name
