= Jace =

Jace or Jase is a masculine given name. It is often short for Jason. It is also, less commonly, a surname.

== People ==
=== Given name ===
- Jace Alexander (born 1964), American television director and actor
- Jace Amaro (born 1992), American football player
- Jace Billingsley (born 1993), American football player
- Jace Bode (born 1987), Australian rules footballer
- Jase Bolger (born 1971), American politician
- Jace Bugg (1976–2003), American golfer
- Jace Chan (born 1994), Hong Kong singer
- Jace Clark (born 2005), American soccer player
- Jase Coburn (born 1983), American basketball coach
- Jace Daniels (born 1989), American football player
- Jase Daniels (born 1982), American linguist
- Jace Denmark (born 2004), American racing driver
- Jace Everett (born 1972), American singer
- Jace Flores (born 1988), Filipino actor
- Jace Fry (born 1993), American Baseball player
- Jace Hall (born 1971), American film producer
- Jace Jung (born 2000), American baseball player
- Jace Kotsopoulos (born 1997), Canadian soccer player
- Jace Lasek, Canadian musician and producer
- Jace LaViolette (born 2003), American baseball player
- Jase McClellan (born 2002), American football player
- Jace Miller, American poet
- Jace Norman (born 2000), American actor
- Jace Peterson (born 1990), American baseball player
- Jase Richardson (born 2005), American basketball player
- Jace Richdale, American television producer
- Jace Rindahl (born 1987), American football coach
- Jase Robertson (born 1969), American television personality
- Jace Salter (born 2003), American rapper best known as Iayze
- Jace Sayler (born 1979), American football player
- Jace Sternberger (born 1997), American football player
- Jace Van Dijk (born 1981), Australian rugby league player
- Jace Whittaker (born 1995), American football player

=== Surname ===
- April Jace (1974–2014), American sprinter, wife of Michael Jace
- Michael Jace (born 1965), American actor convicted of murdering his wife

=== Other ===
- Jace (artist), French graffiti artist

== Fictional characters ==
- Jace Beleren, from Magic: the Gathering
- Jace Corso, one of the main characters in the science fiction television series Dark Matter
- Jase Dyer, on the soap opera EastEnders
- Jace Fox, in the comic book series DC Comics
- Jace Herondale, one of the main characters of The Shadowhunter Chronicles
- Jacaerys Velaryon, also known as Jace, a prominent character in the epic fantasy novella The Princess and the Queen and the novel Fire & Blood, both by George R. R. Martin, as well as the television adaptation of the latter, House of the Dragon
- Helga Jace, in the comic book series DC Comics

== See also ==
- Jayce, given name
