= Jaycee (disambiguation) =

Jaycees or United States Junior Chamber is a leadership training and civic organization for people between the ages of 18 and 40.

Jaycee may also refer to:

- Jaycee (given name), includes a list of people with the name
- Jaycee (Tekken), lucha libre wrestling, video game character
- Jeassy (1936–2001), Indian film director and actor

== See also ==
- JC (disambiguation)
