= Jaycee (given name) =

Jaycee is a given name. Notable people with the name include:

- Jaycee Carroll (born 1983), American-Azerbaijani basketball player
- Jaycee Chan (born 1982), American-born Hong Kong actor and singer
- Jaycee Dugard (born 1980), American kidnapping victim
- Jaycee Horn (born 1999), American football player
- Jaycee John Okwunwanne (born 1985), Nigerian footballer

== See also ==
- Jaycie, given name
- JC (disambiguation), includes list of people whose name begin with the initials
- Jayce, given name
