= McVeigh v. Cohen =

1998 lawsuit in U.S. federal court

- Court: United States District Court for the District of Columbia
- Decided: January 26, 1998
- Citation: 983 F.Supp. 215

Holding
- The United States military violates freedom of speech when discharging a service member for reasons of anonymous speech on the Internet.

Court membership
- Judge sitting: Stanley Sporkin

McVeigh v. Cohen, 983 F.Supp. 215 (1998), was a lawsuit in the United States District Court for the District of Columbia in which a member of the U.S. Navy challenged the military's application of its "Don't Ask, Don't Tell" (DADT) policy, which established guidelines for service by gays and lesbians in the U.S. military. The U.S. Navy sought to discharge Timothy R. McVeigh for declaring his homosexuality, which he had allegedly done via anonymous Internet posts. McVeigh's suit denied he had made such a declaration and charged the Navy with failure to adhere to its own DADT policy in the course of investigating him, while violating the Electronic Communications Privacy Act by collecting his private online communications.

McVeigh won a preliminary injunction against his discharge and the Navy, without acknowledging culpability, allowed him to retire with an honorable discharge. The New York Times called it "a victory for gay rights, with implications for the millions of people who use computer on-line services."

== Background ==
Timothy R. McVeigh (no relation to Oklahoma City bomber Timothy J. McVeigh) entered the Navy at the age of 18 around 1980 and earned four Good Conduct Medals and the Navy Commendation Medal. His performance review in 1997 described him as an "outstanding role model" and an "embodiment of Navy core values." By that time he had reached the rank of Senior Chief Petty Officer.

In September 1997, while based in Honolulu and serving on the nuclear submarine USS Chicago, McVeigh sent email messages from his America Online (AOL) account that used the screen name "boysrch" and the signature "Tim" when communicating with Helen Hajny, a civilian working as a volunteer Ombudsman. The AOL user directory identified the marital status of the owner of that AOL account as "gay". Naval authorities suspected that the "boysrch" handle on AOL was being used by McVeigh and constituted an announcement of his homosexuality. A Navy paralegal, misrepresenting himself, obtained confirmation from AOL by telephone that the account belonged to McVeigh. The Navy initiated an administrative discharge on the basis of his "homosexual conduct, as evidenced by your statement that you are homosexual." A Navy disciplinary board held a hearing at which McVeigh acknowledged he had authored the email messages using the "boysrch" account and presented evidence of prior relationships with women. They concluded that by a preponderance of the evidence McVeigh had engaged in "homosexual conduct" that was grounds for a dishonorable discharge under the then-current DADT policy.

With his discharge scheduled for January 16, 1998, McVeigh, represented by Proskauer Rose, filed suit in the United States District Court for the District of Columbia seeking a preliminary injunction to bar his discharge. His suit named Secretary of Defense William S. Cohen as principal defendant. At stake in addition to McVeigh's job and income were the pension, health and life insurance, and other benefits given when a service member steps down from the Navy honorably, because he expected to soon retire after 20 years of service. The Navy, after first resisting, acceded to the court's request to delay the discharge until January 27.

Privacy advocates supported McVeigh's suit. David L. Sobel of the Electronic Privacy Information Center said: "It is probably the most clear-cut example we have of a violation of this statute on the part of the Government. If the Navy prevails, it will basically mean there is no meaningful protection against government intrusion in cyberspace." An America Online spokesman said: "We have clear policies in place that our member service representatives don't give out member information. What is disturbing to us is that the Navy may have circumvented established channels that we have for working with law enforcement in an attempt to get information about one of our members." A representative of the Servicemembers Legal Defense Network, an advocacy group for gay and lesbian military personnel, said: "Timothy McVeigh didn't work hard to get on anybody's radar screen. The only information that the Navy has is this AOL profile, and I think there's a strong argument that this is the sort of case that demands discretion from the military."

Political commentator Frank Rich thought McVeigh could be:

the man who finally brings home the absurdity and bigotry of Don't ask, don't tell. Mr. McVeigh is as clear-cut a victim of a witch hunt as could be imagined, and that witch hunt could expand exponentially if the military wants to add on-line fishing to its invasion of service members' privacy. Multitudes of military personnel identify themselves as gay on the Internet, rank and base often included.

Rich contrasted the different treatment the U.S. military afforded the two men named Timothy McVeigh. For years the U.S. Army ignored the racism and anti-government radicalism of former soldier Timothy J. McVeigh, who went on to perpetrate the Oklahoma City bombing in 1995. The U.S. Navy by contrast "torments the second, exemplary Timothy [R.] McVeigh for the 'crime' of having a private life that should be nobody's business but his own."

Before a hearing in the case, AOL acknowledged that its customer service representative should not have released information about McVeigh's account. AOL also said the Navy had violated federal law and reported that it had lodged protests with the Navy and Department of Defense. McVeigh's attorney also brought to court a statement from sociologist Charles Moskos of Northwestern University, architect of the DADT policy, who supported McVeigh and called the Navy's investigation of his sexual orientation "unwarranted." In Moskos's words: "In simple terms, Senior Chief McVeigh did not 'tell' in a manner contemplated under the policy – he sent an anonymous e-mail which did not list his surname or his Navy connection."

== Opinion ==
On January 26, 1998, U.S. District Court Judge Stanley Sporkin granted McVeigh a preliminary injunction barring the Navy from discharging him. Sporkin wrote that the central issue was whether the Navy complied with its own Don't Ask, Don't Tell (DADT) policy and, by extension, "whether there is really a place for gay officers in the military under the new policy." Sporkin sometimes referred to DADT by its longer name – "Don't Ask, Don't Tell, Don't Pursue" – as he questioned the Navy's pursuit of information about McVeigh. He wrote:

The facts ... clearly demonstrate that the Plaintiff did not openly express his homosexuality in a way that compromised this "Don't Ask, Don't Tell" policy. Suggestions of sexual orientation in a private, anonymous email account did not give the Navy a sufficient reason to investigate to determine whether to commence discharge proceedings. In its actions, the Navy violated its own regulations.

Sporkin quoted DADT guidelines that specified that "creditable information" from a "reliable person" about sexual orientation was required to prompt an investigation. Instead, he wrote: "When the Navy affirmatively took steps to confirm the identity of the email respondent, it violated the very essence of "Don't Ask, Don't Pursue" by launching a search and destroy mission." Sporkin also called it a "search and 'outing' mission." He noted that "cyberspace ... invites fantasy and affords anonymity," an environment at odds with the regulatory requirement that the subject of an investigation show "a likelihood actually to carry out homosexual acts." He also found that the Navy's investigation had "likely violated" the Electronic Communications Privacy Act of 1986. Though the government had argued that the statute penalized the party that disclosed information, in this case AOL, and not the party requesting information, he wrote:

[I]t is elementary that information obtained improperly can be suppressed where an individual's rights have been violated. In these days of "big brother," where through technology and otherwise the privacy interests of individuals from all walks of life are being ignored or marginalized, it is imperative that statutes explicitly protecting these rights be strictly observed.

On the government's argument that McVeigh had acknowledged owning the AOL account, Sporkin wrote: "That the Plaintiff may have made incriminating statements at the subsequent administrative hearing does not bootstrap the Navy out of its legal dilemma of not only violating its own policy, but also a federal statute in its attempt to charge the Plaintiff with homosexuality." Sporkin concluded with his view of the significance of the DADT policy:

The "Don't Ask, Don't Tell, Don't Pursue" policy was clearly aimed at accommodating gay men and women in the military. In effect, it was intended to bring our nation's armed forces in line with the rest of society, which finds discrimination of virtually every form intolerable. It is self-evident that a person's sexual orientation does not affect that individual's performance in the workplace. At this point in history, our society should not be deprived of the many accomplishments provided by people who happen to be gay. The "Don't Ask, Don't Tell, Don't Pursue" policy was a bow to society's growing recognition of this fact. For the policy to be effective, it has to be implemented in a sensitive, balanced manner. Under the policy as it stands today, gay service members must be permitted to serve their country honorably, so long as they are discrete in pursuing their personal lives.

In conclusion, the court granted McVeigh the preliminary injunction and his discharge was overturned as an "immediate and irreparable injury" to his career and reputation.

== Settlement and impact ==
Clarence Page, writing in the Chicago Tribune, said that the case was "a defining test of the right to privacy in cyberspace and in the military. The military flunked. So did a major on-line service." Arthur Leonard of New York Law School commented: "Every one of these cases that comes to the public's attention reinforces the absurdity of the [DADT] policy, and that can only help us in the long run. It's just a shame some people are turned into martyrs, but it looks as if in this case McVeigh won't be a martyr."

The parties began negotiating McVeigh's retirement with full benefits. A Defense Department official said: "I think many of us would like to see this case go away." But McVeigh's attorney complained that in the days after Sporkin's ruling the Navy had assigned McVeigh to "supervising people moving trash out of a room that's being renovated." In March, Judge Sporkin was asked to consider if the Navy had violated his order not to take any "adverse action" against McVeigh, who contended that the Navy had not provided him with an assignment commensurate with his rank and experience. As negotiations continued, Defense Secretary Cohen supported the Navy's position in the case and warned Attorney General Janet Reno that any settlement needed to make clear the Clinton administration's full support for DADT.

McVeigh and the Navy agreed to a settlement in June 1998. The Navy did not admit any wrongdoing and agreed not to pursue an appeal. McVeigh was allowed to retire with the rank of Master Chief Petty Officer and full benefits. He commented: "I'm happy that this case has been resolved on my terms. I think that all sailors can take comfort from this. I hope it sends a message that the rules and regulations that are in place need to be followed by the military." His attorney said: "It is the first time, as far as I'm aware, that the Navy has let stand a court decision that it has broken the law in this area. Obviously it has a precedent that can be relied on in the future." The Navy also paid McVeigh's $90,000 in legal expenses.

McVeigh retired from the Navy on July 14, 1998. He said he had been treated well by other service members "with an exception of a few senior officers in the submarine squadron." He concluded: "I think the Navy has been fairly pig-headed. I just got set up and this thing just getting passed up the line and no one stopped to look at it."

In a separate settlement reached months earlier but not announced until McVeigh settled with the Navy, America Online apologized and agreed to pay McVeigh damages for having improperly disclosed his identity. Outside the settlement, AOL announced plans to provide all of its 5,000 customer service representatives with "scenario training" to protect their clients' privacy, and it posted a new version of its privacy policy which was written to be, in the words of one commentator, "understandable to us mere mortals."
