= Jase Daniels =

United States Navy linguist (born 1982)

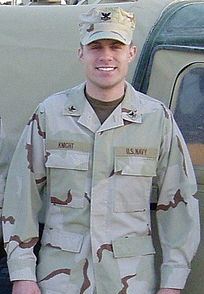
- Jase Daniels in Kuwait, 2007
- Born: July 18, 1982 (age 44); Wallingford, Pennsylvania
- Military career
- Allegiance: United States of America
- Branch: United States Navy
- Service years: 2001-2005, 2006-2007, 2011-Present
- Rank: Petty Officer 2nd Class, E-5

Jase Daniels (born Jason Daniel Knight, July 18, 1982) is a United States Navy linguist who was discharged from the military twice under the policy known as "don't ask, don't tell" (DADT). Daniels served from 2001 to 2005 and again from 2006 to 2007. After coming out in Stars and Stripes, a newspaper published under the sponsorship of the U.S. Department of Defense, Daniels challenged the "don't ask, don't tell" policy that forbade gay and lesbian service members from serving openly. His case attracted attention in such major U.S. media outlets as Newsweek and the New York Times. Daniels returned to active duty in the United States Navy on December 12, 2011, and is believed to be one of the first servicemembers, and perhaps the first, to return to active duty following the end of restrictions on service by openly gay and lesbian servicemembers in the U.S. Armed Forces.

== Early life ==
Daniels grew up in Wallingford, Pennsylvania, where he spent his childhood in and out of foster care and between the custody of his parents John and Theresa who divorced when he was five years old. Despite his rough upbringing, he excelled in arts and sciences at Strath Haven Middle School and won an award for excellence in volunteerism and community service from the Rotary Club. Daniels graduated from Chichester High School in Boothwyn, Pennsylvania, in 2000.

== Military career ==
Daniels enlisted in the United States Navy on April 4, 2001. He served his first two years in the Navy Ceremonial Guard where he was one of the first group to qualify for the Navy Ceremonial Guard Ribbon. Daniels then studied Hebrew at the Defense Language Institute in Monterey, California, graduating in December 2004. Daniels was then transferred to Fort Gordon, Georgia, and served as a Hebrew linguist. There he outed himself in marriage annulment paperwork he submitted to his command and the Navy initiated discharge proceedings under DADT. His discharge records, because of a clerical error, failed to note that his homosexuality was the basis for his discharge and his status became active reservist, which made him eligible for recall.

Daniels was recalled to active duty June 2006 because the military needed his language skills. He later said: "I wanted to go back so bad, I was jumping up and down. The military was my life." He served a year in Kuwait with the Navy Customs Battalion Romeo. Daniels has said that during this deployment he served openly without issue. In May 2007, he was profiled by Stars and Stripes in a cover story that chronicled his life serving in the Armed Forces as an openly gay man. He was discharged again under DADT when his tour ended later that year.

He campaigned publicly for an end to DADT and told Newsweek he thought returning to service would go smoothly: "People like me can be integrated back as well as any other person. I’ll be the first to the recruiting office when DADT is repealed." As the DADT policy was nearing its end in September 2011, he told the New York Times he wanted to resume his Navy career, learn Persian, and become an officer. He joined a lawsuit that attempted to require reinstatement of those discharged under DADT at their former rank, though it was thought to have little success given the reshaping of the U.S. military in these years. He said that since leaving the Navy "I've had no direction in my life." He expressed confidence that his sexual orientation would not be an issue. Daniels was reinstated in the United States Navy on December 12, 2011. After taking his oath he told reporters:

I am humbled as I am reinstated to the job I love and by the enormous support I have received on this momentous day. I look forward to returning to the Defense Language Institute and ultimately, my career in the military.

Daniels transferred back to the Defense Language Institute in Monterey, California, for a Persian course in early January 2012.

Daniels was active as a Command Public Affairs Specialist while stationed at Navy Information Operations Command Georgia (NIOC GA), located in Augusta, GA. He participated in and reported on the inaugural LGBT pride month event that was held on Fort Gordon. He also highlighted Navy Information Operation Command Georgia's robust physical fitness program and the teams aspirations to live up to the Department of Defense Operation Healthy Base Initiative, as well as the support from the command's Family Readiness Group who support families of deployed sailors.

== See also ==
- Sexual orientation in the United States military
