= Jayce =

Jayce is a first name that is often an abbreviation of Jason. Notable people and fictional characters with the name include:

== People ==
- Jayce Brown (born 2005), American football player
- Jayce Fincher, bassist of the rock group Marvelous 3
- Jayce Hawryluk (born 1996), Canadian ice hockey player
- Jayce Landberg, Swedish musician and novelist
- Jayce Lewis (born 1984), Welsh musician
- Jayce Olivero (born 1998), Gibraltarian footballer
- Jayce Tingler (born 1980), American baseball manager

== Fictional characters ==
- the title character of Jayce and the Wheeled Warriors, a 1980s cartoon series
- Jayce Talis, the Defender of Tomorrow, a playable champion character in the multiplayer online battle arena video game League of Legends

== See also ==
- Jace, given name
- Jaycee (given name)
- Jajce, Bosnia, sometimes spelt Jayce
