= Craig Quigley =

U.S. Navy admiral and assistant secretary of defense

Craig Robert Quigley
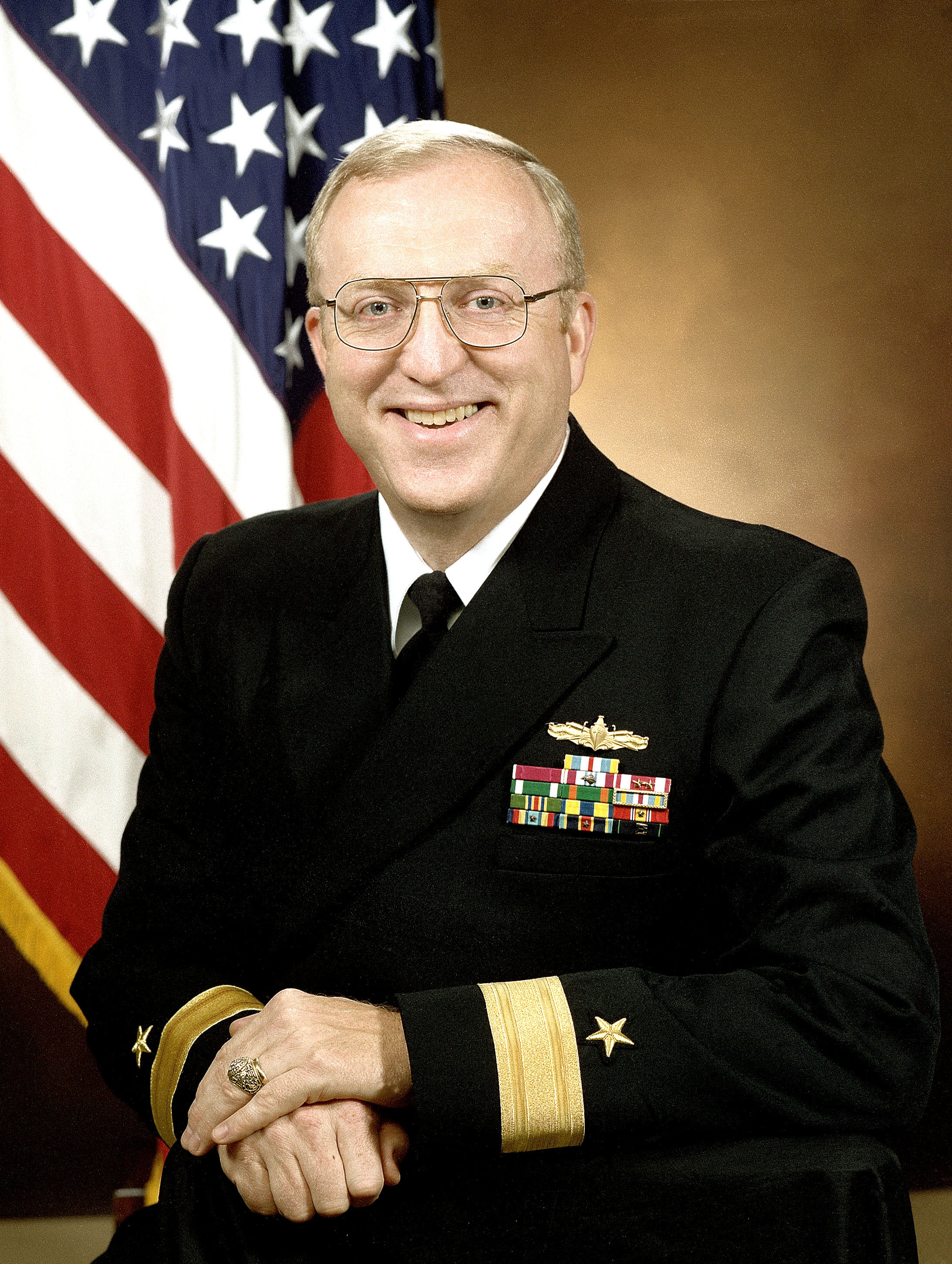
- Born: 1952 (age 73–74); Winthrop, Iowa, U.S.
- Education: United States Naval Academy
- Military career
- Allegiance: United States
- Branch: United States Navy
- Rank: Rear Admiral
- Known for: Deputy Assistant Secretary of Defense (Public Affairs)

Craig Robert Quigley (born 1952) is an officer in the United States Navy and a former deputy assistant secretary of defense, who retired with the rank of rear admiral.

He graduated from the US Naval Academy as president of the Class of 1975. His first duty station was USS Ramsey (FFG-2), where he qualified as a surface warfare officer. He later served aboard USS Thorn (DD-988) before accepting a lateral transfer to the Restricted Line as a public affairs officer. A career naval officer, Quigley served 27 years on active duty, achieving the rank of rear admiral and serving as deputy assistant secretary of defense (public affairs) at the Pentagon. As a Navy spokesman, he expressed the opposition of many in the military towards homosexuals serving in the military when he said, "Homosexuals are notoriously promiscuous" and that in shared shower situations, heterosexuals would have an "uncomfortable feeling of someone watching".

Upon retiring from the Navy, Quigley accepted a position as vice president of communications and public affairs for Lockheed Martin Maritime Systems & Sensors, leading a 30-person communications team across eight states for a $3.5B operating company. After working for Lockheed Martin, Quigley became director of communication for U.S. Joint Forces Command in Hampton Roads, Virginia. He then served as the executive director of the Hampton Roads Military & Federal Facilities Alliance, a public-private partnership dedicated to attracting, retaining and growing federal facilities in the region. He retired from this position in June 2022.

A native of Winthrop, Iowa, Quigley is an active public speaker, and believes in the value of mentoring juniors and developing teamwork to accomplish difficult objectives. He has been listed in Who’s Who in American High Schools and Who’s Who in American Colleges and Universities, and was selected as an “Outstanding Young Man of America” in 1980.

On September 11, 2001, Rear Admiral Quigley was a media spokesperson at The Pentagon.
