= Jace Miller =

American poet

Jace Miller is a poet based in San Diego, California. He was born in Houston, Texas and grew up in and around New York City. His poems have been published on both sides of the Atlantic.

Journals featuring poetry by Jace Miller include Alehouse 2007, Bathtub Gin, The Cortland Review, The Iconoclast, iota poetry quarterly, The Iowa Review, New Letters: A Magazine of Writing and Art and Oberon.
