= JC =

JC may refer to:

== Transportation ==
- JC International Airlines, Cambodia
- Japan Air Commuter (IATA code: JC)
- JAL Express (1998–2014; IATA: JC), Japan
- Rocky Mountain Airways (1965–1991; IATA: JC), United States
- , symbol for Main Line and Rapid services on the Chūō, Itsukaichi, and Ōme Lines

== Arts and media ==
- "JC" (song), a 1996 song by Powderfinger
- J.C. (film), a 1972 American action film
- The Jewish Chronicle, a national British Jewish newspaper

== People ==
- Jesus Christ
- A shortening for French given name Jean-Claude

=== In arts and entertainment ===
- JC (singer) (born 1998), Chinese singer
- JC Chasez (born 1976), American musician
- JC de Vera (born 1986), Filipino actor
- JC Santos (born 1988), Filipino actor
- J. C. Schütz (born 1976), Swedish singer, songwriter musician
- James Cameron (born 1954), Canadian film director and writer
- Jeassy (1936–2001), Indian film director and actor
- John Cale (born 1942), Welsh musician, composer, and record producer

=== In politics and government ===
- J. C. Watts (born 1957), American politician and former professional Canadian football player
- J. C. Gibson (1869–1948), Scottish landowner, military leader, and manager of plantation Port Mourant
- Jeremy Corbyn (born 1949), former leader of the British Labour Party
- Julius Caesar (100–44 BC), Roman General, consul and statesman
- Jimmy Carter (1924–2024), 39th President of the United States

=== In sport ===
- JC French, American football player
- J. C. Hassenauer (born 1994), American football player
- JC Intal (born 1983), Filipino professional basketball player
- J. C. Jackson (born 1995), American football player
- JC Latham (born 2003), American football player
- J. C. Watts (born 1957), American politician and former professional Canadian football player

=== In other fields ===
- J. C. Daniel (1893–1975), Indian naturalist and author
- J. C. Hurewitz (1914–2008), historian

=== Fictional characters ===
- John Connor (born 1985), leader of the resistance in the Terminator franchise
- JC Denton, a fictional character in the computer game Deus Ex
- Joe Chill, the mugger who killed Batman's parents in stories published by DC Comics

== Schools ==
- Jamaica College, a boys' high school in Kingston, Jamaica
- Jamestown College, the former name of the University of Jamestown in Jamestown, North Dakota
- Jones College (Jacksonville), a private college in Jacksonville, Florida
- Junior college, a type of two-year school of higher education

== Other uses ==
- JC virus, a type of human polyomavirus
- .JC extension files, Jesus Crypt Ransomware
- Jersey City, New Jersey
- Jefferson City, Missouri
- Judeo-Christian, a term grouping Judaism and Christianity together
- An emblem of a clothing line by Jackie Chan
- Jaycee (disambiguation)
- Roda JC, a Dutch football club
- Yin–Zhou jinwen jicheng, a compendium of ancient Chinese bronze inscriptions
