= Media portrayals of conversion therapy =

Portrayals of conversion therapy in mass media reflect societal attitudes about sexual orientation or gender identity. Efforts to change an individual's sexual orientation have been depicted in various forms of popular culture such as narrative films, documentaries, television and books.

== Books ==
- Anything but Straight
- Boy Erased: A Memoir
- Homosexual Behaviour: Therapy and Assessment
- Maurice (novel)
- The Miseducation of Cameron Post
- Saving Alex

== Films ==
Year	Title	Country	Type	Notes
2010	8: The Mormon Proposition	United States	Documentary	
2018	Boy Erased	Australia / United States	Narrative	
1999	But I'm a Cheerleader	United States	Narrative	
2018	Deviant	United States	Short	
2016	Fair Haven	United States	Narrative	
2019	Homotherapy: A Religious Sickness	France	Documentary	
2026	Leviticus	Australia	Narrative	
2024	Lilies Not for Me	UK / France / South Africa / United States	Narrative	
2018	The Miseducation of Cameron Post	UK / United States	Narrative	
2021	Pray Away	United States	Documentary	
2023	Toll	Brazil / Portugal	Narrative	Portuguese: Pedágio

== Stage ==
- Book of Mormon
- The One My Soul Loves

== Television ==
Title	Episode	Notes
Criminal Minds	"Broken", Season 8, Episode 15	
Difficult People	"Strike Rat", Season 3, Episode 2	
Half Man	"Episode 5"	
House	"The Choice", Season 6, Episode 12	
Masters of Sex	"The Eyes of God", Season 4, Episode 10	
Monster: The Ed Gein Story	"Sick as Your Secrets", Season 3, Episode 2	Monster anthology series
Pluribus	"Please, Carol", Season 1, Episode 4	
Prayers for Bobby	TV movie	
Ratched	"Angel of Mercy: Part Two", Season 1, Episode 4	
South Park	"Cartman Sucks", Season 11, Episode 2	
