= International Federation for Therapeutic and Counseling Choice =

Organization opposing bans on conversion therapy

- Founder: Mike Davidson
- Website: iftcc.org

The International Federation for Therapeutic and Counseling Choice (IFTCC) is a London-based organization that internationally lobbies governments and religious organizations to oppose bans on conversion therapy, the pseudoscientific practice of attempting to change a person's sexual orientation or gender identity, which has condemned by medical organizations and human rights groups as "unethical, unscientific and ineffective and, in some instances, tantamount to torture."

== History and advocacy ==
The IFTCC is led by Mike Davidson, who describes himself as "ex-homosexual", previously ran the conversion therapy group Core Issues Trust, has practiced conversion therapy on others, and advocates "healing from homosexuality". Davidson has been described as a central figure in the conversion therapy movement and co-directs four organizations providing or advocating conversion therapy. Davidson has been refused certification for the UK Council of Psychotherapy and the British Psychological Society.

In October 2018, the IFTCC organized a conference in the UK in defense of conversion therapy. Some speakers compared LGBT identities to pedophilia. The IFTCC said that doesn't reflect their views and state bans on conversion therapy infringe on personal freedoms.

Quentin Van Meter, the president of the anti-LGBT group American College of Pediatricians gave a speech titled "The Travesty of the Current State of Transgender Medicine" at the IFTCC in November 2018. Van Meter and the American College of Pediatricians, which has been labeled a hate group by the Southern Poverty Law Center, have supported bills banning transgender healthcare for minors.

In February 2019, Maltese Equality Minister Helena Dalli criticized Matthew Grech for his comments about leaving a "homosexual lifestyle" to follow Jesus. The IFTCC filed an official complaint to Malta’s High Commissioner to the UK Joseph Cole describing her criticism as an "unprecedented personal attack" and later hosted the premiere of "Once Gay" in Belfast, a documentary about Grech and "his right to be an ex-gay". The IFTCC also called on Malta to repeal a law passed in 2016 banning therapy. The law had been unanimously passed by Malta's parliament, which Dalli described as "a good day for human rights."

In 2019, the IFTCC organized a conference on changing sexual orientation which was aired on Hír TV. The conference was held in a secret location, which Hír TV stated was because "the homosexual and gender lobby, as well as the medical organizations controlled by them, will make the conversation impossible". Grech was a speaker and stated he converted and realized "the healthiest form of coexistence is a family based on the relationship between a man and a woman." Speakers claimed there was no genetic basis for homosexuality, and that it could be caused by sexual trauma, bullying, or distance from a parent of the same gender.

In October 2019, Davidson represented the UK and Ireland in a press conference held by the Christian fundamentalist group Global Rainbow Crosser Alliance in protest of the International Federation of Human Rights (FIDH) rejecting the alliance’s request to participate in its 40th human rights congress. Davidson stated "professional mental health bodies [in the UK and Ireland] refuse to allow people to receive help to change their sexual preferences" and "the International Federation for Therapeutic and Counseling Choice will continue to offer support to those who de-transition from transgendered identities and those who no longer want to be gay".

In November 2020, the IFTCC organized a conference on conversion therapy. The conference was promoted by The Conference of Bishops of Slovakia and attended by Anna Záborská and several ex-gay and ex-trans speakers. The Slovakian League for Mental Health criticized the conference and stated "Sexual orientation is biological, it is a predetermined interplay of genetic factors and intrauterine environment, it is not a person's personal choice, conscious or unconscious. There is no credible research that suggests that early experiences or traumas influence a person's sexual orientation. Therefore, there is no psychotherapy that could change a person's sexual orientation."

In June 2021, the UK government reached out to representatives from Core Issues Trust and the IFTCC in discussions of the proposed conversion therapy ban. In November, the IFTCC co-hosted a conference along with Christian Concern in favor of opposing the ban. The event was protested by transgender and non-binary people, who shared their experiences of conversion therapy to counter the conference. The same month, the IFTCC opposed Bill C-6, a Canadian resolution to ban conversion therapy, describing such bans a "cultural marxist" strategy, a far right anti-semitic conspiracy theory. The IFTCC stated "Civil disobedience has to be considered by Christian Churches and their members."

In April 2022, Laurie Haynes, a board member of the IFTCC, testified in support of a Missouri bill banning gender-affirming care for minors, arguing that transition should be forced to wait until 25 years old to transition. In a cross-talk, she stated she is in support of voluntary conversion therapy.

In 2022, a journalist from Dagens Nyheter went undercover investigating conversion therapy across Europe and the United States. The reporter contacted the IFTCC and spoke to Davidson, who referred him to the priest Jens Fredrick Brenne, a leader of Til Heltet, a Norwegian Christian group that opposes bans on conversion therapy. Til Heltet and the IFTCC regularly collaborate and Brenne was previously a board member of the IFTCC. When Dagens Nyheter revealed the reporter was undercover and asked Til Heltet for comment, chairman of the board and IFTCC member Ole Gremstad Jensen said they didn't practice conversion therapy, stating "Our work is controversial in nature because the secular West has abandoned the biblical values on which it was once built." Davidson was also reached out to for comment. He declined to comment on how many Swedish parents their organization "helps" but stated they deal with transgender youth and involved parents in the process.
