= Lilies Not for Me =

2024 film by Will Seefried

- Directed by: Will Seefried
- Written by: Will Seefried
- Produced by: Émilie Georges; Naima Abed; Hannes Otto; Roelof Storm; Will Seefried
- Starring: Fionn O'Shea; Robert Aramayo; Erin Kellyman; Jodi Balfour; Louis Hofmann
- Cinematography: Cory Fraiman-Lott
- Edited by: Julia Bloch
- Music by: Theodosia Roussos
- Production companies: Wolflight Films; Paradise City
- Distributed by: Gravitas Ventures
- Release dates: 16 August 2024 (Edinburgh International Film Festival); 12 March 2025 (France)
- Running time: 99 minutes
- Countries: United Kingdom; France; South Africa; United States
- Language: English

Lilies Not for Me is a 2024 period drama film, written and directed by Will Seefried. It premiered at the 2024 Edinburgh International Film Festival and was released digitally by Gravitas Ventures in April 2025.

Set in 1920s England, the film follows Owen James (Fionn O'Shea), an aspiring novelist who was admitted to a medical facility that claims to "cure" homosexual tendencies through then-experimental procedures. As part of Owen's treatment, he is placed under the care of Nurse Dorothy (Erin Kellyman), with whom he shares prescribed daily teatime sessions meant to prepare him for a so-called "normal" heterosexual life.

== Plot ==
In 1920s England, Owen James, an aspiring author, is institutionalized at a medical facility claiming to cure homosexuality. Owen is assigned to Nurse Dorothy, who shares daily teatime sessions with him to prepare him for a heterosexual life. Though initially hesitant, the two bond over the death of Dorothy's brother at war. She later acquires a typewriter for Owen so he can finish his latest novel, implied to be about his life before the institution.

In the past, Owen lives in a cottage with medical student Philip. Though they share a romantic and sexual relationship, Philip is eager to cure his homosexuality through a new treatment known as testicular transplant.

One day, an older man arrives at the cottage claiming to have lived there prior, and has no family. Philip convinces Owen to use the man for the transplant, and Owen obliges, though the old man later dies from the procedure.

As Philip recovers, the old man's son, Charles, arrives at the cottage in search of his father, though his fate is kept secret by Philip and Owen. Although he has a wife and child, Charles confirms his mutual attraction to men to Owen, and they begin a sexual relationship. Spurred by jealousy, Philip offers the procedure to Charles before departing, and Charles dies, devastating Owen.

Owen travels to find Charles' wife, Alice, and son, to deliver the news of his death, telling her it was an accidental drowning. After leaving, Owen visits a secret gay bar Charles had mentioned. There, Owen is led outside and arrested by an undercover cop, leading to his eventual institutionalization.

Back in the present, Nurse Dorothy is caught with Owen's finished manuscript and fired. When another nurse attempts to confiscate Owen's typewriter, Owen tries to escape, though he is caught. Placed in a straight jacket, Owen is brought to the head physician, revealed to be Philip. When Philip asks why Owen does not want to be cured, Owen replies that he is not sick. Saying that Owen had saved Philip's life through the procedure, Philip states that he will be performing the surgery on Owen. During the operation, Owen imagines himself lying in a field of flowers, reminiscing on his past relationships with Philip and Charles.

== Cast ==
- Fionn O'Shea as Owen James
- Erin Kellyman as Nurse Dorothy, Owen's assigned caretaker
- Robert Aramayo as Philip
- Louis Hofmann as Charles
- Jodi Balfour as Alice, Charles' wife

== Production ==
Lilies Not for Me marks Will Seefried's feature directorial debut, produced by Émilie Georges and Naima Abed (whose past credits include producing Luca Guadagnino's Call Me By Your Name). Seefried, who also wrote the screenplay, drew inspiration from archival research into early 20th-century practices that had purported to "cure" homosexuality. Principal photography took place on location in England, with set design and costumes chosen to authentically portray the 1920s setting and underscore the film's themes of repression and forbidden desire. In interviews, Seefried cited classic queer works like James Baldwin's Giovanni's Room, Todd Haynes's Carol, and Merchant-Ivory's Maurice as key influences for the film's tone and style.

== Release ==
Lilies Not for Me had its world premiere at the Edinburgh International Film Festival, where it garnered attention for its blend of romantic period drama and horror elements.

Following its festival debut, the film was acquired by Gravitas Ventures for North American distribution. It was released on digital and VOD in April 2025.
