= Quentin Van Meter =

American pediatric endocrinologist

- Born: September 13, 1947 (age 79)
- Education: Medical College of Virginia
- Occupations: Physician, professor, president of conservative pediatric group, anti-LGBTQ activist
- Known for: Conversion therapy advocate
- Spouse: Kathy Van Meter
- Children: 4

Quentin L. Van Meter (born September 13, 1947) is a pediatric endocrinologist and president of the American College of Pediatricians, a socially conservative advocacy group which is known for opposing gay marriage, gender reassignment surgery, and abortion. He has advocated and referred his clients to conversion therapy and is known for promoting bans on youth transgender health care which are opposed by most medical organizations.

== History and advocacy ==
Van Meter cancelled his 37-year membership of the American Academy of Pediatrics (AAP) in protest of its inclusive stance regarding LGBT people. Van Meter has stated the American College of Pediatricians (ACPeds) was formed when the AAP established a position that gay couples could raise children without adverse effects on their well-being. Van Meter has treated 15 patients diagnosed with gender dysphoria, and stated he referred them to conversion therapy.

In March 2016, Van Meter, as vice president of ACPeds signed a position statement called "Gender Ideology Harms Children" that claimed transgender youth don't exist and transgender people are mentally ill. The Southern Poverty Law Center described it as "anti-trans rhetoric" and has noted that ACPeds has deliberately misrepresented legitimate research in its attacks on LGBT people, to the point that at least one social scientist demanded that the group stop."

In October 2016, North Carolina attempted to pass HB2, which revoked local LGBT nondiscrimination ordinances in the state and forbids transgender people using the bathroom aligning with their gender. The federal government made a motion to halt enforcement of the bill. In August, the state filed a brief defending the bill and provided a court with a statement from Van Meter alleging "gender identity discordance" is "a delusional state".

In November 2017, Van Meter spoke at an anti-LGBT conference organized by the Texas chapter of MassResistance. He gave a presentation titled "Teens for Truth Conference: Countering the LGBT Agenda" hosted at the Southwestern Baptist Theological Seminary in Texas.

In 2018, Van Meter, now President of ACPEDs was scheduled to speak at the University of Western Australia (UWA) as a stop on a national tour sponsored by the Australian Family Association. Students protested the conference, with a petition to cancel gaining 6000 signatories. The conference was cancelled, with the university stating it was because they had not filed risk assessment paperwork in time. The UWA Student Guild President found it bittersweet that it was cancelled due to administrative reasons and not because it was "hate speech." The UWA released a statement which said "The views which have been expressed by the speakers in the past, particularly with respect to transgender people, are at odds with the university's values of respect for human dignity and diversity," but that cancelling the event would "create an undesirable precedent for the exclusion of objectionable views."

In November 2018, Van Meter gave a speech titled “The Travesty of the Current State of Transgender Medicine” for the conversion therapy advocacy group the International Federation for Therapeutic and Counseling Choice.

In November 2019 in Georgia, Meter supported an Atlanta bill by Ginny Ehrhart which would make it a felony to provide hormone treatments or gender affirmation surgery on minors. The SPLC stated "Not only does it contradict the overwhelming medical consensus on treating gender dysphoria by professional medical organizations such as the American Academy of Child and Adolescent Psychiatry, the American Academy of Pediatrics and the American Medical Association, among many others, but it also puts children at risk of irreparable harm."

In February 2020, Van Meter was presented as an expert witness in the case of a Texas divorce case where the couple's child was undergoing gender-affirming care which one parent wanted to end and the other wanted to continue. The judge ruled that Van Meter was "discredited as an expert" and could not offer expert testimony on "the legal question of whether an adolescent transgender child should be administered puberty blockers and whether affirmation of an incongruent gender in a child is harmful or not."

In March 2020 Van Meter testified to the Pennsylvania House Health Committee alongside Stephen B. Levine, opposing informed consent for transgender minors. In September, Van Meter testified to the Pennsylvania House Health Committee again, calling statistics showing transgender youth are more likely to be suicidal skewed samples.

In 2020, Van Meter served as an expert defending the State of Ohio from a lawsuit represented by the ACLU and Lambda Legal demanding trans people be allowed to change their gender on their birth certificate, since it forced them to out themselves to others and risk danger. The Department of Health refused to comment on why he was chosen as an expert. When the plaintiffs' lawyers asked him to explain why he was chosen, he said he didn't know and traced his reputation back to the "Teens for Truth Conference: Countering the LGBT Agenda".

In February 2021, Van Meter was invited to lead a conference on conversion therapy in Singapore called "Transgenderism: Science vs Ideology" hosted by Focus on the Family Singapore and the founders of the Yellow Ribbon Project and Dads for Life. That month he also testified for HB29 in Utah which would prohibit clinicians, doctors, and surgeons from providing gender affirming surgeries or providing hormone therapy to transgender minors.

In April 2021 Meter supported the Arkansas "Save Adolescents from Experimentation act", which probitited doctors providing transgender healthcare to minors or referring them to services that could offer it. The bill also bars insurance from covering minors transition related healthcare and says they're not required to cover it for adults. The American Academy of Pediatrics opposed the bill.

In March 2022, Meter testified in favor of an Idaho Bill which would criminalize doctors providing gender affirming healthcare to minors.

In October 2022, Van Meter served as an expert for Florida in a bill that prevents Medicaid from covering transgender healthcare for low-income adults and minors. In his assessment, he stated the rise in transgender children seeking care was due to "online recruiting and grooming of vulnerable children and adolescents by a generously funded political movement aimed at dissolving the reality and birthright of biologic sex." Medical organizations state that at least some of the increase is due to better understanding and acknowledgement of gender dysphoria. The authors of the state report failed to disclose whether they were paid for research.
