= Missouri Senate Bill 39 =

2023 Missouri law

Missouri Legislature
- Long title: AN ACT To amend chapter 163, RSMo, by adding thereto one new section relating to participation in athletic competition, with a severability clause.
- Territorial extent: Missouri
- Enacted by: Missouri Senate
- Enacted: March 23, 2023
- Enacted by: Missouri House of Representatives
- Enacted: May 10, 2023
- Signed by: Mike Parson
- Signed: June 7, 2023
- Effective: August 28, 2023
- Date of expiry: August 28, 2027

Legislative history

Initiating chamber: Missouri Senate
- Introduced: December 1, 2022
- First reading: January 4, 2023
- Second reading: January 12, 2023
- Third reading: March 23, 2023
- Voting summary: 25 voted for; 8 voted against; 1 absent

Revising chamber: Missouri House of Representatives
- First reading: March 23, 2023
- Second reading: March 24, 2023
- Third reading: May 10, 2023
- Voting summary: 109 voted for; 49 voted against; 3 absent; 1 present not voting

Final stages
- Finally passed both chambers: May 30, 2023

Summary
- Prohibits transgender Missourians from competing in sports from K-12 through college that do not align with their biological sex, with limited exceptions.
- Status: In force

Missouri Senate Bill 39 (SB 39), also known as the Save Women's Sports Act, is a 2023 law in the state of Missouri that prohibits transgender Missourians from competing in school sports leagues that do not align with their biological sex. It was signed into law by Governor Mike Parson on June 7, 2023. The bill will expire on August 28, 2027, four years after its entry into force.

Senate Bill 39, along with Senate Bill 49 (relating to gender-affirming care), have been accused of being discriminatory or anti-transgender. As of September 2024, there are few policies in place to enforce Senate Bill 39 in Missouri schools. Three bills were introduced in 2025 to remove the expiration provision on Senate Bill 39.

== Provisions ==
Senate Bill 39 prohibits student athletes of any gender or sex from competing in school sports that do not align with the sex on their birth certificate. It applies to K-12 schools, private schools, and higher education facilities such as colleges. An exception is included for those assigned female at birth as long as the sport does not have a female-only league. Schools that violate Senate Bill 39 will have their state funding revoked. Missourians would also not be allowed to compete against other teams if they do not have a similar policy in place.

== See also ==
- LGBTQ rights in Missouri
