= Hang Ups (TV series) =

British television series

- Genre: Improvisational comedy
- Created by: Stephen Mangan; Robert Delamere
- Based on: Web Therapy by Lisa Kudrow; Don Roos and Dan Bucatinsky
- Written by: Stephen Mangan; Robert Delamere
- Directed by: Robert Delamare
- Starring: Stephen Mangan
- Opening theme: "You're Dreaming" by Wolf Parade
- Composer: Rael Jones
- Country of origin: United Kingdom
- Original language: English
- No. of seasons: 1
- No. of episodes: 6

Production
- Executive producers: Kevin Loader; Stephen Mangan
- Producer: Louise Delamere
- Production company: Slam Films

Original release
- Network: Channel 4
- Release: 8 August – 12 September 2018

Related
- Web Therapy

Hang Ups is a British television sitcom co-written by and starring Stephen Mangan. It was first broadcast on 8 August 2018 on Channel 4. The series is an adaptation of the American series Web Therapy. Mangan portrays Dr Richard Pitt, a troubled therapist who decides to start quick-fire therapy sessions through a webcam. The show features a celebrity ensemble cast as Richard's patients.

== Cast ==
- Stephen Mangan as Richard Pitt
- Katherine Parkinson as Karen Muller, Richard's wife
- Bebe Cave as Issy Pitt, Richard & Karen’s daughter
- Fionn O'Shea as Ricky Pitt, Richard’s son
- John Macmillan as Abs Walters, Karen's colleague
- Karl Theobald as Pete Thompson, Richard's lifelong best friend
- Alice Lowe as Celia Cain, Richard's clinical supervisor
- Richard E. Grant as Leonard Conrad, Richard's therapist
- Charles Dance as Jeremy Pitt, Richard's father
- Steve Oram as Neil Quinn, a man to whom Richard owes money
- Jessica Hynes as Katherine Pitt, Richard's sister
- Conleth Hill as Jon Pitt, Richard's brother
- Celia Imrie as Maggie Pitt, Richard's mother
- Paul Ritter as Werner Lienhard, Karen's boss

Pitt's therapy patients are portrayed by a large ensemble cast, including Harry Lloyd, Sarah Hadland, Lolly Adefope, Monica Dolan, David Bradley, Jo Joyner, David Tennant and Daisy Haggard.

== Episodes ==
No. overall	No. in series	Title	Directed by	Written by	Original release date	UK viewers (millions)
1	1	"Episode 1"	Robert Delamere	Robert Delamere & Stephen Mangan	8 August 2018	1.62
Failed therapist Richard Pitt (Stephen Mangan) launches a career in web therapy at age 44 after the collapse of his previous practice. Working from home only provides £9,000 per year and proves chaotic due to interruptions from his wife Karen (Katherine Parkinson), friend Pete (Karl Theobald) and father Jeremy (Charles Dance), while the menacing Neil (Steve Oram) is chasing Richard for the money that he is owed.
2	2	"Episode 2"	Robert Delamere	Robert Delamere & Stephen Mangan	15 August 2018	0.91
Richard looks for a way to avoid the impending arrival of his alcoholic mother, but his siblings Katherine (Jessica Hynes) and Jon (Conleth Hill) fail to provide any support. Neil has a successful therapy session with Richard, but insists he must pay his debt.
3	3	"Episode 3"	Robert Delamere	Robert Delamere & Stephen Mangan	22 August 2018	0.72
Neil reveals a little too much about his dark past, which leaves Richard fearing for his life.
4	4	"Episode 4"	Robert Delamere	Robert Delamere & Stephen Mangan	29 August 2018	0.67
Richard's mother Maggie (Celia Imrie) has moved in and piles on the emotional devastation while Karen has her own problems at work.
5	5	"Episode 5"	Robert Delamere	Robert Delamere & Stephen Mangan	5 September 2018	0.62
Working from home starts to get the better of Richard, and with Karen away and uncontactable he has to keep his business running, arrange Ricky's (Fionn O'Shea) birthday party, and give therapy to clients, while the ongoing threat from Neil forces Richard to increase surveillance in the family home.
6	6	"Episode 6"	Robert Delamere	Robert Delamere & Stephen Mangan	12 September 2018	N/A
Mounting pressure from Neil forces Richard to make big decisions without Karen's knowledge. Arguments over Maggie's future culminate in them realising she is in fact missing, and clients unexpectedly turning up on the doorstep leaves Richard wondering if maybe he shouldn't have enjoyed himself quite so much at Ricky's party.

== Reception ==
The first episode of Hang Ups received a positive response from critics. The Telegraph awarded the premiere five stars, calling it a "wonderfully ribald treat", while The Guardian praised it for managing "the rarest of TV feats: a UK adaptation that's every bit as good as the US original". The Daily Express complimented the show for "successfully [using] comedy to shine light on the importance of mental health without crossing a line".
