= Fionn O'Shea =

Irish actor (born 1997)

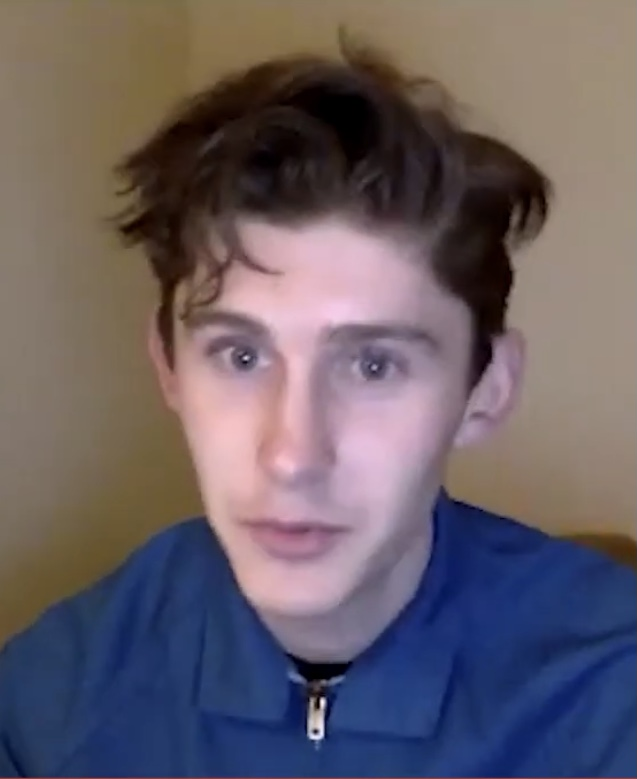
- O'Shea in 2022
- Born: 2 January 1997 (age 29); Dublin, Ireland
- Occupation: Actor
- Years active: 2007–present

Fionn O'Shea (born 2 January 1997) is an Irish actor. He starred in the films Handsome Devil (2016), Dating Amber (2020), Dance First (2023) and Lilies Not for Me (2024). On television, he is known for his roles in the Channel 4 sitcom Hang Ups (2018), the BBC Three & Hulu miniseries Normal People (2020), and the Netflix miniseries House of Guinness (2025).

== Early life and education ==
O'Shea attended Gonzaga College in Ranelagh, Dublin. He went on to train at Visions Drama School.

== Career ==
In 2007, O'Shea made his film debut in the Irish short film New Boy; it received an Academy Award nomination for Best Live Action Short Film. In 2009, he made his feature film debut, playing an orphan boy in A Shine of Rainbows. Between 2009 and 2012 he appeared on Roy, an Irish-British animated children's television series. In 2016, he portrayed Ned Roche in the Irish comedy-drama film Handsome Devil. At the 15th Irish Film & Television Awards in 2018 he was nominated for Actor in a leading role and Rising Star Award. In 2018 he featured on Hang Ups, a British television sitcom. Also in 2018 he appeared in Innocent, a British television miniseries. In 2019, he played a supporting role in the drama film The Aftermath. In 2020, he played Eddie in Dating Amber, and Jamie in Normal People. His most recent film is Lilies Not for Me, in which he starred as Owen James.

== Filmography ==
=== Film ===
Year	Title	Role	Notes
2007	New Boy	Seth Quinn	Short film
2009	A Shine of Rainbows	Orphan Boy #1	
2016	The Siege of Jadotville	William Reidy	
2016	Handsome Devil	Ned Roche	
2019	The Aftermath	Barker	
2020	Dating Amber	Eddie	
2021	Cherry	Arnold	
2021	Wolf	Rufus/German Shepherd	
2023	Dance First	Samuel Beckett	
2024	Lilies Not for Me	Owen James	
2024	Four Letters of Love	Nicholas Coughlan	
TBA	The Queen of Fashion	Philip Treacy	Post-production

=== Television ===
Year	Title	Role	Notes
2009–2012	Roy	Jack	24 episodes
2010	The Santa Incident	Hamley	Television film
2010	Jack Taylor	Peter Gannon	Episode: The Priest
2013	Jack Taylor: Priest	Peter Gannon	Television film
2014	The Centre	Corky Kavanagh	Episode #1.5
2018	Innocent	Jack	4 episodes
2018	Hang Ups	Ricky Pitt	6 episodes
2020	The Letter for the King	Tristan	Episode: "Storm Clouds Gather"
2020	Normal People	Jamie	Recurring role; 5 episodes
2024	Masters of the Air	Sgt. Steve Bosser	Apple TV+ Miniseries; 2 episodes
2025–present	House of Guinness	Benjamin Guinness	Main role

== Awards and nominations ==
Year	Award	Category	Nominated work	Result	Ref.
2017	FilmOut San Diego	Best Actor in a Feature (Audience Awards)	Handsome Devil	Won	
2018	Irish Film & Television Awards	Actor in a leading role	Handsome Devil	Nominated	
2018	Irish Film & Television Awards	Rising Star Award	Handsome Devil	Nominated	
2021	Apolo Awards	Best Ensemble Cast	Dating Amber	Nominated	(Note: Shared with Dating Amber cast.)
2021	Irish Film & Television Awards	Lead Actor in a Film	Dating Amber	Nominated	
2021	Irish Film & Television Awards	Supporting Actor in a Drama	Normal People	Won	
