= Missouri Senate Bill 49 =

Missouri Save Adolescents from Experimentation (SAFE) Act

Missouri Legislature
- Long title: AN ACT To repeal sections 208.152, 217.230, and 221.120, RSMo, and to enact in lieu thereof four new sections relating to gender transition procedures.
- Territorial extent: Missouri
- Enacted by: Missouri Senate
- Enacted by: Missouri House of Representatives
- Signed by: Mike Parson
- Signed: June 7, 2023
- Effective: August 28, 2023
- Date of expiry: August 28, 2027

Legislative history

Initiating chamber: Missouri Senate
- Introduced: December 1, 2022
- First reading: January 4, 2023
- Second reading: January 12, 2023
- Third reading: March 23, 2023
- Voting summary: 24 voted for; 8 voted against; 2 absent

Revising chamber: Missouri House of Representatives
- First reading: March 23, 2023
- Second reading: March 24, 2023
- Third reading: May 10, 2023
- Voting summary: 108 voted for; 50 voted against; 4 absent

Summary
- Restricts medical professionals from administering gender-affirming medical care to Missourians under eighteen years of age.
- Status: In force

Missouri Senate Bill 49 (SB 49), also known as the Missouri Save Adolescents from Experimentation (SAFE) Act, is a 2023 law in the state of Missouri that restricts access to gender-affirming medical care for minors, such as hormone replacement therapy (HRT), puberty blockers, and sex reassignment surgery. It was signed into law by Governor Mike Parson on June 7, 2023 and entered into force on August 28. As a result of negotiations in the legislature, the ban on hormone replacement therapy and puberty blockers is set to expire on August 28, 2027. However, the ban on surgeries has no expiration date.

It was passed alongside Senate Bill 39, which restricts transgender Missourians from competing in sports differing from their biological sex. The bill was filibustered by Missouri Democrats in the legislature and only passed after a compromise was made to allow the law to expire in 2027. Lawsuits were filed against Senate Bill 49 following its passage, including one by the ACLU of Missouri and Lambda Legal in July 2023. In November 2024, a Missouri circuit judge ruled in favor of upholding the law.

== Provisions ==
Senate Bill 49 prohibits medical professionals in the state of Missouri from administering gender-affirming hormone therapy, which can include estradiol valerate, testosterone, and puberty blockers. Sex reassignment surgery is also prohibited. It followed emergency regulations issued by Attorney General Andrew Bailey, which included an 18-month waiting period before minors could be prescribed any such treatment.

== See also ==
- LGBTQ rights in Missouri
