= Visions Drama School =

Drama school and agency in Dublin, Ireland

Coordinates: 53.3449348°N 6.2646549°W

- Type: Acting school and talent agency
- Director: Mary Murray
- Location: Dublin, Ireland
- Website: www.visionsdrama.com/

Visions Drama School is an Irish drama school and talent agency based in Temple Bar, Dublin.

The director of the school and acting instructor is Mary Murray, an Irish actress and acting coach. She has worked on projects including Penny Dreadful, Love/Hate, The Magdalene Sisters, and Adam & Paul.

== Notable people ==
=== Alumni ===
- Hazel Doupe
- Lauren Kinsella
- Fionn O'Shea
