= American College of Pediatricians =

Conservative advocacy group

- Founded: 2002; 24 years ago
- Founders: Gerry Boccarossa and Joseph Zanga
- Type: 501(c)(3)
- Tax ID no.: 47-0886878
- Location: Gainesville, Florida
- Members: slightly more than 700
- Key people: Quentin Van Meter, (President)
- Revenue: $178,000 (2022)
- Expenses: $143,000 (2022)
- Website: www.acpeds.org

The American College of Pediatricians (ACPeds) is a socially conservative religious advocacy group of pediatricians and other healthcare professionals in the United States, founded in 2002 by Gerry Boccarossa and Joseph Zanga. The group advocates in favor of abstinence-only sex education and conversion therapy, and advocates against vaccine mandates, pornography, abortion rights and LGBT rights. As of 2022, its membership has been reported at about 700 physicians.

ACPeds has been listed as a hate group by the Southern Poverty Law Center for pushing "anti-LGBTQ junk science". A number of mainstream researchers, including the director of the US National Institutes of Health, have accused ACPeds of misusing or mischaracterizing their work to advance their own political agenda. ACPeds has also been criticized for their professional-sounding name, which may mislead people into thinking they are a professional medical organization or mistake them for the similar-sounding American Academy of Pediatrics (AAP).

== Background ==
The group was founded in 2002 by a group of pediatricians, including Joseph Zanga, a past president of the American Academy of Pediatrics (AAP), as a protest against the AAP's support for adoption by gay couples. In 2005, The Boston Globe noted that ACPeds was being used as a counterpoint to anything the AAP said, despite ACPeds being run by one employee at the time. ACPeds sends out a mailing list to thousands of "conservative physicians" as a recruitment strategy, with doctors and medical students who hold Christian views being their top priority. More than 10,000 recruitment emails were sent out to them between 2013 and 2017 alone.

=== Membership ===
ACPeds has struggled to attract many members in the past, but has gained outsize political influence by "using conservative media as a megaphone in its quest to position [itself] as a reputable source of information." The group gained national attention in 2024 for being one of the plaintiffs in the federal lawsuit, FDA v. Alliance for Hippocratic Medicine, which sought to limit access to the abortion drug, mifepristone.

In 2012, the Southern Poverty Law Center (SPLC) estimated the ACPeds membership at "no more than 200". In 2016 ACPeds reported its membership at "over 500 physicians and other healthcare professionals", while leaked internal documents in 2023 identified approximately 1,200 current and former members with about 700 active.

==== Affiliations ====
The ACPeds has affiliated itself with other conservative medical and religious groups including the Catholic Medical Association (CMA), the Alliance for Hippocratic Medicine (AHM), the American Association of Christian Counselors (AACC), the Association of American Physicians and Surgeons (AAPS), Christian Medical and Dental Associations (CMDA), the National Catholic Bioethics Center (NCBC), the Center for Bio-Ethical Reform, the Lutheran Church and the United Reformed Churches in North America; as well as with anti-LGBT organizations and anti-abortion organizations including Genspect, the Discovery Institute, the Family Research Council, Family Watch International, Focus on the Family, Moms for Liberty, Family Policy Alliance, Ethics and Public Policy Center, the American Family Association, Gays Against Groomers, Protect Our Kids and The National Center for Law & Policy, some of which have been designated as hate groups by the Southern Poverty Law Center.

According to notes from a leaked 2017 board meeting released by Wired, ACPeds considered "the Southern Poverty Law Center, the Human Rights Campaign, and the LGBTQ lobbying body, as well as mainstream medicine, psychology, academia, media, corporate America and nominal Christians, churches and organizations" as the organization's main opposition.

=== SPLC "hate group" designation ===
The American College of Pediatricians has been described by the Southern Poverty Law Center (SPLC) as a "hate group", and a "fringe group" which closely collaborates with the National Association for Research & Therapy of Homosexuality (NARTH) with "a history of propagating damaging falsehoods about LGBT people, including linking homosexuality to pedophilia". ACPeds has previously stated that the SPLC's labeling of ACPeds as a "hate group" has hurt its fundraising efforts. Following a 2023 data leak, a strategy document revealed a "unified plan" by ACPeds members and its allies that attempted to discredit the SPLC in retaliation. The strategy included an effort aimed at lowering SPLC's rating on Charity Navigator.

=== Activities ===
In 2023, the American College of Pediatricians was a plaintiff in Alliance for Hippocratic Medicine v. FDA, which sought to overturn the FDA's approval of mifepristone as an abortion drug. Leaked minutes from 2021 showed that the group has collaborated with religious groups in order to influence opinion leaders in courts, academic literature, and in state legislatures.

Since 2021, representatives of ACPeds have lobbied several state legislatures in support of legislation to ban gender-affirming care for transgender youths, as part of a campaign that succeeded in passing such laws in several states.

In December 2023, ACPeds teamed up with the Catholic Medical Association (CMA) in the case American College of Pediatricians, et al v. Becerra which challenges president Joe Biden's executive order that sought to reinterpret the word "sex" in federal laws to include sexual orientation and gender identity, particularly in the Affordable Care Act.

Members and presidents of ACPeds have frequently appeared in conservative media including Tucker Carlson Tonight and Fox News and misinformation about LGBT people by ACPeds has been parroted by conservative and far-right outlets, commentators and organizations including Glenn Beck, the Christian Broadcasting Network, The Daily Caller, Breitbart and the Family Research Council.

==== Publications and research ====
According to leaked internal documents, most of the research done by ACPeds has been written by one person and many of their papers have been rejected by medical journals. Because of this, the group's board of directors unanimously voted to release their rejected papers online, but under the term "not published" because it sounded "nicer than rejected".

In response to the publication by the American Academy of Pediatrics of Just the Facts, a handbook on teen sexual orientation aimed at a school audience, ACPeds issued its own publication, Facts About Youth, in March 2010. Facts About Youth, along with a cover letter, was mailed to 14,800 school superintendents. Facts About Youth was challenged as not acknowledging "the scientific and medical evidence regarding sexual orientation, sexual identity, sexual health, or effective health education" by the American Academy of Pediatrics.

The ACPeds letter to the superintendents primarily addressed same-sex attraction, and recommended that "well-intentioned but misinformed school personnel" who encourage students to "come out as gay" and affirm them as such may lead the students into "harmful homosexual behaviors that they otherwise would not pursue". The ACPeds letter to the superintendents also stated that gender dysphoria will typically disappear by puberty "if the behavior is not reinforced" and similarly alleged that "most students (over 85 percent) with same-sex attractions will ultimately adopt a heterosexual orientation if not otherwise encouraged."

==== 2023 data leak ====
In 2023, unsecured Google Drives on ACPeds' website were subject to a data breach, leaking over 10,000 confidential documents, including financial and tax records, membership rosters, social security numbers, usernames and passwords of members, resignation letters, budgetary and fundraising affairs as well as email exchanges between members extending over ten years, among other sensitive and personal information.

Leaked communications between members revealed members painting transgender people as carriers of a contagious "pathological disorder" that can be spread between people, claiming that watching anime is "brainwashing boys into behaving like girls" as well as giving physicians instructions on how to discuss a "variety of scenarios about a multitude of topics" regarding sex with their child patients even when the child's parents are not present.

== Positions ==
=== Abortion ===
ACPeds strongly opposes abortion, calling it "a clear violation of the Hippocratic Oath." In 2023, ACPeds was a plaintiff in the federal lawsuit, FDA v. Alliance for Hippocratic Medicine, which sought to limit access to the abortion drug mifepristone.

An internal document obtained in a data leak revealed a script that ACPeds provided to its members for appointments with pregnant minors. Wired Magazine, who obtained copies of the leaks, described the script as being "engineered specifically to reduce the odds of minors coming into contact with medical professionals not strictly opposed to abortion". The script also encourages its members to tell pregnant minors that abortion "not only kills the infant you carry, but is also a danger to you."

=== LGBTQ rights ===
ACPeds strongly opposes gay marriage, gay adoption and gay parenting and has submitted several Amicus Briefs in court cases opposing them. They also support conversion therapy for gay youth and have linked homosexuality to pedophilia.

ACPeds believes homosexuality leads to health risks and shorter lifespans. Additionally, they believe that people are not born lesbian, gay or bisexual and that gay identification in adolescences will ultimately be temporary if not encouraged.

In 2015, then-ACPeds president, Michelle Cretella, strongly denounced the Supreme Court decision, Obergefell v. Hodges, which legalized gay marriage nationwide, saying it was "a tragic day for America's children".

The organization's view on the relevance of sexual orientation to parenting differs from the position of the American Academy of Pediatrics (AAP), which holds that there is no connection between orientation and the ability to be a good parent and to raise healthy and well-adjusted children.

ACPeds has vehemently criticized the American Psychological Association as a "gay-affirming program" that "devalues self-restraint" and supports "a child's autonomy from the authority of both family and religion, and from the limits and norms these institutions place on children".

ACPeds also strongly opposes gender-affirming medical care for transgender people. The group has also referred to transgender people as a "cultish religion".

ACPeds frequently testifies in state legislatures in favor of anti-trans laws.

Anti-trans statements from ACPeds are frequently reposted on social media by conservative influencers such as Glenn Beck, Elon Musk and Robby Starbuck in a way that falsely implies the statement to be coming from the Americans Academy of Pediatrics. These viral posts have led to fact-checks by websites like Snopes distinguishing the two groups.

=== Pornography ===
ACPeds opposes pornography.

=== Vaccines ===
ACPeds opposes vaccines. Surgical oncologist David Gorski has said that statements from ACPeds have been used by quack sites like Natural News to push an anti-vaccine agenda. Gorski has said that organizations spreading misinformation regarding HPV vaccines have often cited ACPeds.

=== Religion ===
Joseph Zanga, the group's founder, described ACPeds as having "Judeo-Christian, traditional values". While an anonymous member of the group's board of directors, said that ACPeds is a "conservative and religious" organization, but that the group was "too busy trying to walk the fence" in order to gain clout to acknowledge that. Most of ACPeds' publications are not overtly religious, but they have been noted to contain traditionally religious positions on social issues like same-sex relationships and sexual abstinence.

ACPeds instructs its members to encourage their patients to purchase "Christian-based parenting guides" as well as workbooks that teach children about "sexual purity" which includes Bible scriptures and parables.

== Reception ==
Some scientists have voiced concerns that ACPeds mischaracterized or misused their work to advance its political agenda. Gary Remafedi, a pediatrician at the University of Minnesota, wrote ACPeds a public letter accusing them of fundamentally mischaracterizing his research in their publications to argue that schools should deny support to gay teenagers. Francis Collins, a geneticist and director of the U.S. National Institutes of Health (NIH), issued a statement through the NIH accusing the ACPeds of misleading children and parents on its Facts About Youth website. Warren Throckmorton, a therapist who specializes in sexual orientation issues, similarly stated that his research had been misused, saying of ACPeds: "They say they're impartial and not motivated by political or religious concerns, but if you look at who they're affiliated with and how they're using the research, that's just obviously not true." In an amicus brief regarding the removal of a child from the foster home of a same-sex couple (Kutil and Hess v. West Virginia) the National Association of Social Workers (NASW) described ACPeds as a "small and marginal group" which was "out of step with the research-based position of the AAP and other medical and child welfare authorities". The LGBT advocacy organization PFLAG categorizes the ACPeds as an anti-equality organization, describing the group as a "small splinter group of medical professionals who do not support the mainstream view of the American Academy of Pediatricians (AAP) that homosexuality is a normal aspect of human diversity".

In response to an ACPeds brief, the American Civil Liberties Union (ACLU) wrote that ACPeds is a fringe group that has acted to promote "unscientific and harmful 'reparative therapies' for LGBTQ students".

Jack Turban, a fellow in child and adolescent psychiatry at Stanford University School of Medicine, said that "With no support from the mainstream medical community, conservative legislators have gone and found this handful of people who have 'MD' after their name, but lack the research, experience, and evidence to back their claims" and that ACPeds was "small but clever anti-LGBT group [that] created a legit-sounding name."

As of 2021, ACPeds is regularly quoted in major news outlets after first gaining prominence in the right-wing outlets. While the news outlets typically acknowledge that they represent a minority of the medical community, Brianna January, of Media Matters for America, expressed concern that outlets often omitted that ACPeds has a history of "promoting anti-LGBTQ claims" and has been labeled a hate group by SPLC, saying "It is completely irresponsible for the media to cite an extreme anti-LGBTQ group with an innocuous-sounding name like American College of Pediatricians. Placing its dangerous disinformation next to credible sources makes it falsely appear that this is a debatable topic, skewing how the public and policymakers understand the issue."

Heron Greenesmith, a senior analyst at Political Research Associates, said in an article about ACPeds that "the widely accepted studies into best practices for trans youth have been undermined by a few physicians and mental health providers who espouse right-wing or explicitly anti-LGBTQ views" because "people tend not to question folks with a medical degree."

According to Freedom for All Americans, the American College of Pediatricians has helped shape the anti-trans debate in "nearly every state legislature" advocating for anti-trans bills and described Quentin Van Meter, the current president of ACPeds, as "foremost person being cited by anti-trans advocates."

Brennan Suen, the LGBTQ program director at Media Matters for America said of ACPeds, that Republican politicians "go to great lengths to highlight the few medical professionals who agree with them because they give a veneer of credibility" to anti-LGBT misinformation.

Wired Magazine described ACPeds as "a small conservative organization working to lend a veneer of medical science to evangelical beliefs on parenting, sex, procreation, and gender", after obtaining and reviewing thousands of internal documents from the group.

BuzzFeed News said ACPeds "effectively accomplished for gender dysphoria what anti-vaxxer medical professionals have sought to do for their cause: give credence to the notion that no scientific or medical consensus exists regarding the relative safety and efficacy of a given treatment, despite the clear and growing evidence to the contrary."

In 2025, The Heritage Foundation, a conservative think tank, awarded ACPeds with its annual "Heritage Innovation Prize" which recognizes and gives large financial awards adding up to $1 million to conservative nonprofit organizations. With the prize money, ACPeds plans to "expand its campaign to reach over 67,000 pediatricians, encourage them to reject harmful ideological mandates".

== See also ==
- American Pediatric Society
- Academic Pediatric Association
