= Encinitas Union School District =

School district in California, United States

Address
- 101 South Rancho Santa Fe Road Encinitas, California, 92024; United States

District information
- Type: Public
- Grades: K–6
- Established: 1883
- Superintendent: Andree Grey, Ed.D.
- Schools: 9
- NCES District ID: 0612750

Students and staff
- Students: 4,918 (2020–2021)
- Teachers: 224.02 (FTE)
- Staff: 268.53 (FTE)
- Student–teacher ratio: 21.95:1

Other information
- Website: www.eusd.net

Encinitas Union School District is a public elementary school district in San Diego County, California, United States.

The EUSD district operates nine elementary schools and one additional property:

- Capri Elementary School
- El Camino Creek Elementary School
- Flora Vista Elementary School
- La Costa Heights Elementary School
- Mission Estancia Elementary School
- Ocean Knoll Elementary School
- Olivenhain Pioneer Elementary School
- Park Dale Lane Elementary School
- Paul Ecke Central Elementary School
- Farm Lab DREAMS Campus

== See also ==
- National Center for Law & Policy, school yoga class lawsuit
