= Dance First =

2023 film by James Marsh

- Release poster
- Directed by: James Marsh
- Written by: Neil Forsyth
- Produced by: Michael Livingstone; Tom Thostrup; Fabian Westerhof; Viktória Petrányi; Deborah Aston
- Starring: Gabriel Byrne; Fionn O'Shea; Sandrine Bonnaire; Léonie Lojkine; Bronagh Gallagher; Gráinne Good; Robert Aramayo; Maxine Peake; Aidan Gillen
- Cinematography: Antonio Paladino
- Edited by: David Charap
- Production companies: Umedia; Film Constellation; Sky Arts; 2Le Media; Proton Cinema
- Distributed by: Sky Cinema; StudioCanal
- Release dates: 30 September 2023 (Zinemaldia); 3 November 2023 (United Kingdom)
- Running time: 100 minutes
- Countries: United Kingdom; Belgium; Hungary
- Language: English
- Box office: $208,519

Dance First is a 2023 biographical film about Irish playwright Samuel Beckett, directed by James Marsh and written by Neil Forsyth. Gabriel Byrne stars as Beckett, with a supporting cast featuring Fionn O'Shea as a younger Beckett and Aidan Gillen as James Joyce.

== Synopsis ==
The film documents the Irish writer's life, from his childhood, his friendship with James Joyce until the incarceration of the latter's mentally ill daughter Lucia Joyce, his relationship with his future wife Suzanne Dumesnil, his time as a fighter for the French Resistance during the Second World War, his postwar literary rise and subsequent Nobel Prize for Literature in 1969, his affair with translator Barbara Bray and his later life until his death in 1989. Throughout the film, Beckett carries out an interior monologue.

== Cast ==
- Gabriel Byrne as Samuel Beckett
- Fionn O'Shea as the eldest of three younger Becketts
- Aidan Gillen as James Joyce
- Maxine Peake as Barbara Bray
- Sandrine Bonnaire as Suzanne Dechevaux-Dumesnil
  - Léonie Lojkine as young Suzanne
- Robert Aramayo as Alfred Peron
- Bronagh Gallagher as Nora Barnacle
- Lisa Dwyer Hogg as May Beckett
- Barry O’Connor as William Beckett
- Gráinne Good as Lucia Joyce
- Caroline Boulton as Sylvia Beach

== Production ==
=== Development ===
In November 2021, it was announced that James Marsh was to direct the bio-pic with Gabriel Byrne playing Beckett from a screenplay from Neil Forsyth and a title taken from Beckett's ethos on life of "Dance first, think later". Byrne said he was attracted to the project by Forsyth’s “extremely clever” script which he called a “a surreal interpretation, that has something to do with the spirit of Beckett”. The project was developed with Sky Arts in the U.K. and produced by 2LE Media's Michael Livingstone and Tom Thostrup, alongside Viktória Petrányi of Hungary's Proton Cinema and Belgium's Umedia. The project isn't the first time Forsyth has written about Beckett - his Sky Playhouse short film Waiting for Andre was about the real-life friendship between Beckett and a teenage Andre the Giant.

=== Casting ===
In May 2022, it was announced that Aidan Gillen joined the cast along with Sandrine Bonnaire and Fionn O'Shea as a younger Samuel Beckett. Gillen confirmed to The Times that his role was that of James Joyce and that Marsh is “a great film-maker, so the Beckett story is in good hands.” In September 2022, it was revealed that Maxine Peake, Robert Aramayo, Leonie Lojkine, Bronagh Gallagher, Lisa Dwyer Hogg, Barry O'Connor and Gráinne Good had joined the cast.

=== Filming ===
Principal photography began in Budapest in May 2022. Filming locations in Budapest included the corner of Gerlóczy utca and Vitkovics Mihály utca, the steps of the Vígszínház, Dohány utca, the lobby of Hotel Gellért and the New York Kávéház.

On set in Budapest Byrne was interviewed by The Guardian and described the project as an effort to flesh out a character whom “people know very little about. He was a man who had a sense of humour, who was deeply emotional, who was a failure in his own eyes for a great deal of his life”. Byrne described how the man's sense of self contrasts greatly with the global notoriety and fame that came from being subsequently awarded the Nobel prize, and yet how he remained a man “who lived the last part of his life alone in a very simple room in a nursing home”. Discussing his performance Byrne said “Physically I can sketch him, but with this film we are not looking for an impersonation of Beckett, rather a sense of who he was. What you want is people to believe the man, not focus their attention on the wig or the makeup or the false nose.”

== Release ==
The film closed the 71st San Sebastián International Film Festival's official selection on 30 September 2023. The film was theatrically released in the United Kingdom on 3 November 2023, by Sky Cinema in association with StudioCanal.

== Reception ==
The Guardian's Claire Armitstead called Dance First, "a small masterpiece" and said of Byrne's performance, "such is the power of the storytelling that within minutes you believe in him entirely". The Irish Times called the film "striking" and praised O'Shea's "excellent" performance and Gallagher's "fine turn". The Times called Byrne "one of Ireland's great actors". Screen Daily called the film's formal premise "ingenious", adding there is "definitely a Beckettian ring to the dialogue" and called Byrne's performance, "rueful but often tartly humorous evocation of Beckett as a vulnerable, tender figure, he convincingly humanises a writer often represented as an inaccessibly lofty secular prophet".

In The Guardian, Peter Bradshaw mentioned Gillen's performance as one of the best in a supporting role on film in 2023. Bradshaw said the film is “well-acted and tells the story with verve”, and complimented Byrne's “austere and droll” Beckett. The Financial Times called Marsh “a graceful stylist” and praised the performances of Bonnaire and Peake, saying, “There is dramatic elegance to the mirrored excellence of the actresses”. The Irish Independent said that Byrne, “sinks into the role remarkably well” and called the film, “an honourable attempt at a Beckett biopic, well cast and not overplayed”.

The Business Post's review of the film called it “formally ingenious” and observed that “when Byrne – or Byrnes – takes centre stage, the film sings”. The Irish Examiner called Byrne and O’Shea “terrific” and said “Dance First is a literary biopic that deserves all the garlands that come its way”. The Arts Desk praised Forsyth's “wonderful” dialogue and “the elegant chiaroscuro of Antonio Paladino's cinematography.The Film Verdict said “Forsyth’s tricksy narrative swerves, Marsh’s brisk directing style, Antonio Paladino’s ravishing monochrome photography and Byrne’s fine-grained hangdog performance all add up to an absorbing overall package”

Dance First was released in North America in 2024. It had its American premiere at the Santa Barbara International Film Festival before being released in limited theaters on August 9, 2024, and distributed by Magnolia Pictures. Upon its American release, Screen Rant said “the sharp script by Neil Forsyth elevates the words of Beckett and Joyce to the grandeur of their work. Both Byrne and Gillen do extraordinary jobs…exploiting the simultaneous depth and simplicity of the story”. The review concluded “Dance First won’t strike a chord with everyone, but it's also not intended for mainstream appeal, and those who connect with it will do so deeply”.

Dance First was well received in Europe. In Spain, where Dance First was selected as the closing film for the 71st San Sebastian Film Festival, El Español praised “the magnificent performances of Irish actor Gabriel Byrne and French actress Sandrine Bonnaire”. which it called “pure acting alchemy” and said the dialogue was “reminiscent of Citizen Kane”.

In Italy, where the film was renamed Prima Danza Poi Penza Alla Ricerca di Beckett (First Dance, Then Think – In Search of Beckett) and was selected for the Torino Film Festival., Ondacinema said it was a “successful film, that gives us back Beckett” The Corriere Della Sera called it a “powerful portrait of guilt” and Sentiere said the film was “well-written” and praised Byrne’s “excellent” performance.

On the review aggregator website Rotten Tomatoes, 43% of 34 critics' reviews are positive, with an average rating of 5.1/10. Metacritic, which uses a weighted average, assigned the film a score of 46 out of 100, based on 10 critics, indicating "mixed or average" reviews.

== Awards ==
In March 2024, Bronagh Gallagher was nominated for Best Supporting Actress at the IFTA Film & Drama Awards.

Dance First won Best Single Drama at the 2024 Celtic Media Festival.
