= Dating Amber =

2020 LGBT comedy film

- Theatrical release poster
- Directed by: David Freyne
- Written by: David Freyne
- Produced by: Rachael O'Kane; John Keville
- Starring: Fionn O'Shea; Lola Petticrew; Sharon Horgan; Barry Ward
- Cinematography: Ruairí O'Brien
- Edited by: Joe Sawyer
- Production companies: Screen Ireland; Altitude Film Entertainment; Broadcasting Authority of Ireland; Atomic 80 Production; Wrong Men; Voo; BeTV
- Distributed by: Wildcard Distribution (Ireland and United Kingdom) (Note: Theatrical release only.); Samuel Goldwyn Films (United States)
- Release dates: 4 June 2020 (Amazon Prime Video; United Kingdom and Ireland); 29 June 2020 (Ireland; theatrical); 3 July 2020 (United Kingdom; theatrical); 11 November 2020 (United States)
- Running time: 92 minutes
- Countries: Ireland; United Kingdom; United States; Belgium
- Language: English

Dating Amber is a 2020 coming-of-age comedy-drama film written and directed by David Freyne. The film features two closeted teenagers in 1990s Ireland who decide to start a fake heterosexual relationship to hide their actual sexualities. The film was produced with assistance from Fís Éireann - Screen Ireland, RTÉ, Broadcasting Authority of Ireland, BeTV Belgium and BNP Paribas Fortis Film Fund (France). The film was distributed in Ireland through Wildcard.

It was released on Amazon Prime Video in Ireland and the UK on 4 June 2020, followed by a theatrical release in Ireland. The film was released in the US on 11 November 2020.

== Plot ==
The film is set in 1995 in The Curragh, Ireland, where teenagers Eddie and Amber are treated like outsiders and are distraught over persistent homophobic abuse. They decide to join forces and hide their sexuality from the rural Irish town in which they live by pretending to be a heterosexual couple.

Amber wants to escape a life overshadowed by the suicide of her father to lead a lesbian punk lifestyle in a more liberal environment. She is saving money to move to London by surreptitiously renting out caravans to teenage couples in need of some privacy on a park her mother runs. Eddie is not so confident of his sexuality and intends to follow his insensitive and often absent father into the Irish Army as is expected of him.

On trips to Dublin the faux couple begin to absorb its gay culture. Eddie is seen passionately kissing another man in a gay bar by someone from their home town. This causes Eddie to panic and attack him and other witnesses to his kiss. Meanwhile, Amber begins a secret relationship with Sarah, a girl she also meets in the gay bar in Dublin.

Amber comes out to her mother, who meets Sarah and understands that her daughter wants and needs to be with her girlfriend. She is then outed to the town through the local priest, after her mother goes to confession, breaking his vow of silence on a technicality.

Initially Eddie cannot accept that his pretense with Amber is over, and goes so far as insulting her publicly. He then tries to establish a heterosexual relationship with schoolmate Tracey prior to joining the army.

When Eddie is about to enlist and board a bus for basic training, Amber appears and offers him her savings to help him escape living a lie. He hesitantly accepts his sexuality and the money to buy a train ticket to another life. Eddie opens the box containing the money, revealing half of a photo booth picture strip inside. The film ends with both of them smiling, finally accepting who they really are.

== Cast ==
- Fionn O'Shea as Eddie Cotter
- Lola Petticrew as Amber Keenan
- Sharon Horgan as Hannah Cotter
- Barry Ward as Ian Cotter
- Simone Kirby as Jill Keenan
- Evan O'Connor as Jack Cotter
- Ian O'Reilly as Kevin "Kev" Burn
- Emma Willis as Tracey Brennan
- Anastasia Blake as Janet
- Lauryn Canny as Sarah
- Shaun Dunne as Cian
- Adam Carolan as Geoff
- Peter Campion as Sweeney
- Arian Nik as Adam
- Andrew Bennett as Captain Rory

== Production ==
David Freyne wrote and directed the film with Rachael O'Kane and John Keville of Atomic 80 producing in co-production with Belgian company Wrong Men. The film received funding and production support from Screen Ireland and the Broadcasting Authority of Ireland. Will Clarke, Andy Mayson, and Mike Runagall of Altitude, Dearbhla Regan of Screen Ireland, and Rory Dungan of Wildcard executive produced. Principal photography took place in summer 2019.

== Release ==
Wildcard released the film in Ireland and Altitude handled UK and some international distribution; this announcement came with a first look promotional image. It was announced along with a trailer in May 2020 that the film would premiere on Amazon Prime Video available in the UK and in Ireland in June before a later Irish theatrical release on 3 July.

Samuel Goldwyn Films acquired the North American rights. The company released a trailer for the film in September. Dating Amber was showcased at the Canadian Inside Out Film and Video Festival in October. The film was available in North America digitally and on-demand from 13 November. It has since been available to stream on HBO Max.

== Reception ==
Rotten Tomatoes reported an approval rating of 94% based on 52 reviews, with an average rating of 7.3/10. The website's critics consensus reads, "Dating Amber colors outside the rom-com lines to tell a sweetly poignant story about friendship and self-acceptance."

=== Awards and nominations ===
| Year | Award | Category | Recipient(s) | Result | Ref. |
|---|---|---|---|---|---|
| 2020 | NewFest | Jury Award for International Narrative Feature | David Freyne | Runner-up | |
| 2020 | NewFest | Audience Award for Narrative Feature | David Freyne | Won | |
| 2020 | Camerimage | Best Directorial Debut | David Freyne | Nominated | |
| 2021 | IFTA Film & Drama Awards | Best Film | Dating Amber | Nominated | |
| 2021 | IFTA Film & Drama Awards | Director – Film | David Freyne | Nominated | |
| 2021 | IFTA Film & Drama Awards | Script – Film | David Freyne | Nominated | |
| 2021 | IFTA Film & Drama Awards | Lead Actor – Film | Fionn O'Shea | Nominated | |
| 2021 | IFTA Film & Drama Awards | Lead Actress – Film | Lola Petticrew | Nominated | |
| 2021 | IFTA Film & Drama Awards | Supporting Actor – Film | Barry Ward | Won | |
| 2021 | IFTA Film & Drama Awards | Supporting Actress – Film | Sharon Horgan | Won | |
| 2021 | IFTA Film & Drama Awards | Costume | Joan O'Clery | Nominated | |
