= Core Issues Trust =

British Christian fundamentalist organisation

- Abbreviation: CORE
- Type: Christian fundamentalist; Religious dogmatic
- Key people: Mike Davidson
- Website: www.core-issues.org

The Core Issues Trust is a British Christian fundamentalist organisation that purveys conversion therapy for LGBT people, including minors.

== Purpose ==
The Trust offers psycho-therapeutic therapy to those who experience 'unwanted homosexual behaviour and feelings.' Core Issues Trust states it believes human sexuality in both men and women is a choice, and that sexual preferences can change. The Trust says it does not consider homosexuality a native human behaviour, but rather a relational or sexual damage that causes deviancy that may be cured. These views are not aligned with the contemporary consensus of psychology and medical and psychiatric bodies, as well as the positions of various human rights organisations internationally, emphasising not merely the ineffectiveness, but the inhumanity, of conversion therapy as a form of torture and, for minors, child abuse, and that gender-based desire is both an inherent characteristic (excl. natural fluidity) and not a disease to be cured.

The group's leader, Dr. Mike Davidson, describes himself as ex-gay; he holds a doctorate in education rather than in a relevant field, with no education nor experiences in physiology or medicine. He had been a trainee therapist in psychodrama before being suspended by the British Psychological Society for reasons unshared.

Conversion therapy is widely accepted as pseudoscientific and considered an extreme belief.

== Controversies and public backlash ==
In June 2011, the Core Issues Trust organized a one-day event in a church in Belfast entitled "Interrogating the Pejoratives: Considering Therapeutic Approaches and Contexts for those Conflicted in Sexual Identity". Some of the topics on the agenda were "How parents can help their children avoid homosexuality" and "A Christian and psychological perspective on overcoming obstacles to freedom from homosexuality". Gay rights groups protested against the Church of Ireland that the event was being held in one of the country's churches.

In April 2012, the organization received media coverage following a public campaign, which included advertisements on London buses the already disproven claim that therapy could change sexual orientation, and including the message Not gay! Ex-gay, post-gay and proud. Get over it!. Although the campaign was passed by the Committee of Advertising Practice, it was subsequently banned by then- London Mayor Boris Johnson for its harmful rhetoric and implications against a minoritised and marginalised community and misinformative messaging. The Trust was denied an appeal by the Court of Appeal against the ban, although it secured a review of the Mayor's actions. The Trust lodged a further case in the High Court in January 2014, alleging that Johnson had unlawfully used his position to ban the ad. The Court ruled against the Trust once more, stating that the decision had been made by the Transport for London Board.

In 2018, the Trust released the documentary Voices of the Silenced which follows the experiences with conversion therapy of 15 gay and lesbian individuals. The documentary was criticized by LGBT rights charity Stonewall, who highlighted "LGBT people aren't ill. Being gay, lesbian, bi or trans is not something that should be 'cured' or changed," and by Humanists UK, slammed as containing "outdated religious views about sin and sexuality".

In 2019, the Core Issues Trust produced and promoted the film Once Gay: Matthew and Friends about the X Factor Malta contestant Matthew Grech who announced his renunciation of homosexuality on television. Mike Davidson argued that individuals have the right to "leave unwanted homosexual practices" if they want to. The film sparked protest. Afterwards, Matthew Grech stated in an interview that he still identified as gay. Queen's University Belfast refused to screen the film, citing commitments to equality, diversity and inclusion and avoiding content which undermines these values, reflecting strong concern in academia that its message was discriminatory and potentially harmful.

In May 2020, the National Secular Society lobbied the Northern Ireland Executive over the charitable status of the group, writing "Bogus therapies which encourage people to change or suppress their sexuality are harmful and widely discredited. Those promoting them shouldn't enjoy the tax breaks and public recognition that charitable status brings."

Core Issues Trust's motto of 'Challenging gender confusion; upholding science and conscience' is widely criticised by feminist and gender theorists as it amplifies and echoes the bioessentialist ideas of gender roles and expectations used to justify historic institutional misogyny and transgender oppression and ignores the universality of homosexuality as well as the flexibility of gender across civilisations, continents, species and time periods, grounded in narrow, colonial ideas of what is natural and inherent, as opposed to abnormal and harmful. From such a perspective, the necessity of an intersectional lens of discrimination and injustice becomes evident.

== See also ==
- Conversion therapy
- Legality of conversion therapy
- History of conversion therapy
- Religious discrimination
- Christianity and sexual orientation
