= LGBTQ rights in Missouri =

- Missouri (US)
- Legal status: Legal since 2003; From 1999-2002, was only legal in Western District counties (State of Missouri v. Cogshell)
- Discrimination protections: Sexual orientation protection solely in public employment

Family rights
- Recognition of relationships: Same-sex marriage since 2015
- Adoption: Yes

Lesbian, gay, bisexual, transgender, and queer (LGBTQ) people in the U.S. state of Missouri may experience some legal challenges that non-LGBTQ residents do not. Same-sex sexual activity is legal in Missouri, in accordance with 2003's Lawrence v. Texas decision. In 2006, Missouri legislatively repealed its unenforceable sodomy laws.

Missouri recognizes same-sex marriages. A state court ruling striking down Missouri's same-sex marriage ban ordered the City of St. Louis to issue marriage licenses to same-sex couples. St. Louis County and Jackson County also issue marriage licenses to same-sex couples. On June 26, 2015, the decision of the U.S. Supreme Court in Obergefell v. Hodges invalidated the denial of marriage rights to same-sex couples, including Missouri's.

Missouri is categorized "High Priority to Achieve Basic Equality," the lowest ranking category, in the Human Rights Campaign State Equality Index.

== Law regarding same-sex sexual activity ==
Until 2006, Missouri law defined "deviate sexual intercourse" as "any act involving the genitals of one person and the hand, mouth, tongue, or anus of another person or a sexual act involving the penetration, however slight, of the male or female sex organ or the anus by a finger, instrument or object done for the purpose of arousing or gratifying the sexual desire of any person."

Missouri criminalized having "deviate sexual intercourse with another person of the same sex" as "Sexual Misconduct in the First Degree." In 1986, the Supreme Court of Missouri upheld the constitutionality of this prohibition in State v. Walsh. When the U.S. Supreme Court's 2003 decision in Lawrence v. Texas rendered laws banning consensual sexual activity unenforceable, Missouri was one of only 4 states that criminalized only homosexual sodomy.

In 2006, Missouri removed consensual sodomy from its definition of "Sexual Misconduct in the First Degree."

== Recognition of same-sex relationships ==
In August 2004, 71% of Missouri voters ratified Amendment 2, which restricted the validity and recognition of marriage in Missouri to the union of one man and one woman. Missouri became the first of many states to pass such a referendum.

=== Same-sex marriage from other jurisdictions ===
Missouri has recognized same-sex marriages from other jurisdictions since November 2013. On November 14, 2013, Governor Jay Nixon issued an executive order allowing same-sex couples married in other jurisdictions to file a combined Missouri income tax return if they file their federal return jointly. A lawsuit aiming to reverse his order, Messer v. Nixon, was filed in Cole County Circuit Court on January 8, 2014.

The ACLU filed a lawsuit, Barrier v. Vasterling, challenging the state's refusal to recognize same-sex marriages from other jurisdictions in state circuit court on February 1, 2014. On October 3, Judge J. Dale Youngs ruled that Missouri's refusal to recognize same-sex marriages from other jurisdictions violated the plaintiffs' right to equal protection under both the state and federal constitutions. On October 6, Missouri Attorney General Chris Koster announced the state would not appeal the decision.

=== Lawsuits ===
==== Glossip v. Missouri Department of Transportation ====
Kelly Glossip sued the state for survivor benefits after the death of his husband, a highway patrol officer. After the trial court dismissed his suit, Glossip appealed to the Missouri Supreme Court. The Missouri Supreme Court ruled 5–2 against Glossip in October 2013, saying his claim was denied on the basis of his marital status, not his sexual orientation.

==== State of Missouri v. Florida ====
In June 2014, St. Louis officials licensed four same-sex marriages in order to provide the basis for a lawsuit when the state ordered them to stop the practice. St. Louis Circuit Judge Rex Burlison found for the plaintiffs on November 5, ruling that Missouri's refusal to license same-sex marriages violates the Missouri and federal constitutions. Missouri Attorney General Chris Koster did not seek a stay of the ruling's implementation. He and the Recorders' Association of Missouri said Judge Burlison's order only applied to the city of St. Louis, where the city's marriage license department began issuing marriage licenses to same-sex couples. St. Louis County, where an official said "We believe it's a county-by-county decision", began issuing marriage licenses to same-sex couples the next day.

==== Lawson v. Kelly ====
On June 24, 2014, the ACLU filed Lawson v. Kelly in Jackson County circuit court on behalf of two same-sex couples who had been denied marriage licenses in Jackson County. Missouri Attorney General Chris Koster had the case moved to federal district court, where U.S. District Court Judge Ortrie D. Smith ruled for the plaintiffs on November 7. He ordered Jackson County to issue marriage licenses to same-sex couples, but stayed his order pending appeal. Despite the stay, Jackson County began issuing marriage licenses to same-sex couples immediately following the decision. On November 21, the plaintiffs asked Judge Smith to lift his stay in light of State of Missouri v. Florida, noting that the state has no position on the request. Attorney General Koster filed notice of appeal in the Eighth Circuit Court of Appeals on December 5.

==== Walsh & Nance v. Friendship Village of South County ====
After a senior housing complex rejected a married lesbian couple, a housing discrimination lawsuit was filed in 2018 by the National Center for Lesbian Rights and the ACLU of Missouri. The lawsuit argued that this was a case of sex discrimination. A federal judge dismissed the case in 2019, claiming that the discrimination occurred not on the basis of sex but rather sexual orientation, and that the federal Fair Housing Act does not prohibit discrimination based on sexual orientation. The plaintiffs appealed to the 8th Circuit. The 8th Circuit has chosen to wait for the Supreme Court to issue related rulings that are expected in spring 2020. (Those expected rulings include Altitude Express, Inc. v. Zarda, Bostock v. Clayton County, and R.G. & G.R. Harris Funeral Homes Inc. v. Equal Employment Opportunity Commission.)

=== U.S. Supreme Court ruling ===
On June 26, 2015, the decision of the U.S. Supreme Court in Obergefell v. Hodges invalidated the denial of marriage rights to same-sex couples, making Missouri's restrictions on the licensing and recognition of same-sex marriages unenforceable. On July 7, Governor Jay Nixon issued an executive order directing all state agencies to comply with that ruling, while also rescinding his earlier, narrower executive order with respect to same-sex marriages from other jurisdictions, which his new ordered superseded.

== Domestic partnership registries ==
Map of Missouri counties and cities that offer domestic partner benefits either county-wide or in particular cities. City offers domestic partner benefits County-wide partner benefits through domestic partnership County or city does not offer domestic partner benefits

A number of jurisdictions within Missouri provide domestic partnership registries which only allow for certain benefits and are only valid and applicable within city or county borders:

- City of Clayton: Residents of the city. Both opposite- and same-sex couples.
- City of Columbia: No residency requirement. Both opposite- and same-sex couples.
- Jackson County: Residents of the county. Both opposite- and same-sex couples.
- City of Kansas City: Residents of the city. Both opposite- and same-sex couples.
- City of Olivette: No residency requirement. Both opposite- and same-sex couples.
- City of St. Louis: Residents of the city. Both opposite- and same-sex couples.
- University City: Residents of the city. Both opposite- and same-sex couples.

== Adoption and parenting ==
Missouri has no laws limiting the rights of individuals to adopt children based on the adoptive parents' LGBT status. As of 2009, with respect to same-sex couples, as well as to second-parent adoption where the second parent is the same sex as the first parent, there had been no explicit prohibitions nor any court cases. The Missouri law allowing adults to petition to adopt is MO. ANN. STAT. § 453.010.

== Discrimination protection ==
Map of Missouri counties and cities that have sexual orientation and/or gender identity anti–employment discrimination ordinances Sexual orientation and gender identity with anti–employment discrimination ordinance Sexual orientation in public employment

Since 2010, an executive order was signed by the Governor of Missouri - that explicitly includes "sexual orientation protections for government based employees within Missouri". Missouri legislation does not address discrimination based on gender identity or sexual orientation whatsoever. After being proposed for nine years, a bill to add "sexual orientation" to Missouri's non-discrimination statute had its first committee hearing in March 2010. On May 17, 2013, the Senate passed legislation banning discrimination on the basis of sexual orientation in employment, housing, and public accommodations by a 19–11. The House of Representatives adjourned without considering the legislation.

== Hate crime law ==
Missouri's hate crime statutes explicitly address both sexual orientation, defined as "male or female heterosexuality, homosexuality or bisexuality by inclination, practice, identity or expression," and gender identity, defined as "having a self-image or identity not traditionally associated with one's gender."

== Public opinion ==
A September 2011 Public Policy Polling survey found that 32% of Missouri voters supported the legalization of same-sex marriage, while 59% were opposed and 9% were not sure. A separate question on the same survey found that 62% of respondents supported legal recognition of same-sex couples, with 28% supporting same-sex marriage, 34% supporting civil unions, 37% opposing all legal recognition and 1% not sure.

A May 2012 Public Policy Polling survey found that 36% of Missouri voters supported the legalization of same-sex marriage, while 52% were opposed and 12% were not sure. A separate question on the same survey found that 64% of respondents supported legal recognition of same-sex couples, with 33% supporting same-sex marriage, 31% supporting civil unions, 32% opposing all legal recognition and 4% not sure.

A 2017 Public Religion Research Institute (PRRI) poll found that 58% of Missouri residents supported same-sex marriage, while 35% opposed. 7% were undecided. Additionally, the same poll found that 65% of Missouri residents supported an anti-discrimination law covering sexual orientation and gender identity, while only 28% opposed. Furthermore, 54% were against allowing public businesses to refuse to serve LGBTQ people due to religious beliefs, while 37% supported allowing such religiously based refusals.

== Transgender rights ==
=== Sports ===
In May 2023, a bill (SB39) formally passed the Missouri Legislature to legally ban all transgender athletes in any female sports and/or athletics. The bill was signed into law by the Governor of Missouri. A "sunset clause" was added to the legislation so that it will automatically be repealed on August 28, 2027.

=== Name and gender changes ===
On April 22, 2013, Missouri courts heard case 13AR-CV00157 about a name change due to gender transition. The amendments granted the petitioner the right to change gender with the Missouri Department of Revenue and other state identification and then on May 20, 2013, case 13AR-CV00240 was heard before the Missouri courts, with a partial delay, on the matter of gender affirmation and recognition, that indirectly allowed for an exception to Mo. Ann. Stat. § 193.215(9).

Under a sealed court order, by the original petitioner, cases 13AR-CV00157 and 13AR-CV00240 were invalidated and reversed in May 2022. By virtue of the invalidation and reversal of said cases, Mo. Ann. Stat. § 193.215(9) was never invalidated due to the former orders and now that those cases have been reversed there is currently no workaround to the surgical requirement in state law.

Under Mo. Ann. Stat. § 193.215(9) a court order will be needed with certified proof of change of sex. This certified proof will need to be printed on the hospital's official letterhead including the attending physician's licensing and contact information; also, the certification needs to state "The Petitioner's physical sex has been altered and the surgical changes are irreversible in accordance with Mo. Ann. Stat. § 193.215(9)". All amendment questions or issuance of an amended certificate of birth should be referred to the Missouri Bureau of Vital Statistics and any legal questions concerning the process should be referred to a lawyer. Any changes on the birth certificate will be noted on the original copy of the birth record and marked "amended" on the abstract copy with the corresponding authority (law) listed. The original birth certificate, not including the abstract copy, will have the old name and gender struck through with the corrected name and gender typed above the strike-through. Any challenges to this process will have to be filed in a district or federal court after a circuit court has denied petition.

Between 2016 and 2024, the Missouri Department of Revenue accepted Form 5532 for gender designation changes on a license or ID. It was implemented after a review of state policies marked the department with a 'F' score for human rights and LGBT acceptance. The policy was abruptly changed after an "unspecified incident," once again requiring civilians to acquire either surgery documentation or a court order to change their gender marker.

=== Transgender youth ===
In November 2024, a court order allowed the Missouri legislation to go into effect immediately, implementing an explicit ban on any gender-affirming healthcare for children and minors.

As of April 2021, a bill to ban transgender girls from participating in girls' sports teams was advanced in the Missouri House of Representatives. The provision was tacked onto another House bill by a 100–51 vote. The bill died due to sin dine (adjourned) of the Missouri General Assembly.

On April 12, 2022, the house passed a bill to ban transgender individuals from female sports and athletic teams (a similar bill passed in the same House chamber last year). An amendment also passed to "legally allow random inspection of students' genitals within school districts within Missouri" - attached to a Voter Rights Bill so it had more of a chance at passing.

On April 21, 2022, the house debated House Bill 2649, which was sponsored by Representative Suzie Pollock and officially titled the "Save Adolescents from Experimentation (SAFE)" act. The bill would prevent healthcare providers from providing or referring transgender healthcare to anyone under 18, and waives insurance providers the responsibility of covering transgender healthcare. During the hearing, a psychologist named Laurie Haynes, representing, the International Federation for Therapeutic and Counseling Choice, a lobbyist organization for LGBT conversion therapy, said she supported conversion therapy and pushed for raising the age on the bill to 25. The bill runs contrary to scientific consensus and the recommendations set out by most major medical organizations in the U.S. The bill was protested by trans student activists outside the state capitol, who spoke out in support of their medical rights. The bill ultimately did not pass.

In addition, the house debated HB 1669, proposed by Brian Seitz whose second clause states, "No pupil in any public school shall be required to engage in any form of mandatory gender or sexual diversity training or counseling. The bill died in the committee.

Pollock also added a companion bill, HB 2399, which would extend the window for medical malpractice suits for trans healthcare from 2 years of age through the age of 28. The bill would also mandate that before anyone of any age can get trans healthcare, they must be presented with detransition statistics and "information on potential therapeutic, nonmedical approaches." The bill died in committee.

=== Healthcare access ===
==== Youth ====
Since August 28, 2023, people under 18 cannot begin gender-affirming hormones or puberty blockers (though they may continue them if they began taking them before this date). In May 2023, the ban was passed by the Missouri Legislature as the Missouri Save Adolescents from Experimentation (SAFE) Act. Democrats in the state senate negotiated a sunset clause that will automatically repeal the bill on August 28, 2027.

Civil rights advocates including the ACLU of Missouri sued to block the law. In August 2024, the court denied their request for a preliminary injunction to block the ban from taking effect while the case was pending. The trial began in September 2024 in the 44th Judicial Circuit Court. On November 25, 2024, Judge Robert Craig Carter ruled that the ban was constitutional. Lambda Legal and the ACLU of Missouri immediately announced that they would appeal the ruling.

Prior to that, in March 2023, Missouri Attorney General Andrew Bailey issued an emergency order — to remain in effect for no less than 30 legislative days or 180 calendar days, whichever is longer — declaring gender-affirming healthcare for trans youth experimental, referring to it as "mutilating children for the sake of a woke, leftist agenda", and implementing the following restrictions:

- Mandating no care be given without a waiting period of 1.5 years or 15 psychological evaluations, whichever is longer.
- Mandating that any healthcare provider ensure any pre-existing mental health comorbidities are "treated and resolved" prior to starting treatment.
- Mandating that healthcare providers implement a process to track any and all adverse effects relating to the patient's access to gender-affirming healthcare, for a minimum period of 15 years from the beginning of treatment.
- Mandating that any prospective healthcare recipient be screened for autism.
- Mandating that any provider obtain and keep on file a written record of informed consent
- Mandating that patients must be screened at least yearly for any signs of "social contagion" with regards to their gender identity.

In April 2023, the AG issued an order expanding this directive, mandating that additionally:

- Patients must now be screened for "social media addiction" at most six months prior to beginning care, with followup screenings annually.
- The patient must sign a written consent disclosure every three months for the first three years of treatment, and every six months thereafter.
- The patient must be assessed at least annually from the beginning of treatment for continuing dysphoria.

The attorney general withdrew this order on May 16 after the state legislature passed two bills restricting gender-affirming care for trans youth.

==== Adult ====
In April 2023, Missouri Attorney General Andrew Bailey issued an emergency order (set to expire in February 2024) that would have limited gender-affirming care for adults. However, a judge temporarily blocked it, and in May 2023, Bailey withdrew it.

The order had declared gender-affirming healthcare for adults "experimental" and severely restricted adult trans care, requiring it to meet the following conditions:

- The patient has exhibited medically documented, consistent, and intense gender dysphoria for at least three years prior to the beginning of treatment.
- The patient has been through at least 15 psychiatric sessions over an 18-month period, at least 10 of which being with the same therapist, "to explore the developmental influences on the patient's current gender identity" and to screen for any mental health comorbidities.
- Any detected comorbidities must be fully "treated and resolved".
- The patient has been screened for autism.
- The provider must track and document any adverse affects potentially related to the care for a period of 15 years from the beginning of treatment, and prepare it in a form that can be accessed readily for systemic study.
- The patient must be assessed at least annually from the beginning of treatment for continuing dysphoria.
- The patient must be regularly screened for any signs of "social contagion".
- The patient must sign a written consent disclosure every three months for the first three years of treatment, and every six months thereafter.
- The provider must maintain in the patient's records detailed documentation of said patient's compliance with the above regulations.

Some media outlets pointed out that this order constituted a ban on trans healthcare for adults with conditions as minor as depression or anxiety, while others characterized it as a de facto ban on trans care entirely given that such conditions in trans people are often caused by dysphoria and lack of access to such care in the first place.

In July 2026, Missouri governor Mike Kehoe signed into law bill H.B. 2009, which includes a clause denying gender-affirming healthcare to trans inmates. The law, which was sponsored by state representative Dirk Deaton and went into effect on July 2, states, "No funds shall be expended for any cross-sex hormones, or gender transition surgery undertaken for the purpose of any gender transition."

==== Tipline ====
The state of Missouri currently operates a tipline for citizens to anonymously report any suspected violations of the above orders, as well as general complaints and concerns about a "gender transition intervention" they know of taking place.

=== Sanctuary cities ===
In May 2023, Kansas City area was formally declared itself a sanctuary city for transgender individuals and transgender rights. In February 2024, Columbia city council voted to include LGBT protections in the sanctuary city ordinance.

=== Missouri police ===
In May 2023, the Missouri Attorney-General did not actually know the difference between "civil" and "criminal" penalties - let alone the police or law enforcement of the recently passed transgender healthcare ban by the Legislature (even way before the Missouri Governor let alone has not signed into law the bill yet).

== HIV law reforms ==
In August 2021, Missouri passed and implemented a bill (SB53) into law to overhaul and reform HIV criminalization laws established in the 1980s - from a felony to a misdemeanor. Similar to California's HIV law.

== Summary ==
Same-sex sexual activity legal	Yes (Since 1999 in western counties of the state, since 2003 statewide; codified in 2006)
Equal age of consent (17)	Yes
Anti-discrimination laws in employment	Yes (Since 2020)
Anti-discrimination laws in housing	No / Yes (Only in some cities and counties)
Anti-discrimination laws in public accommodations	No / Yes (Only in some cities and counties)
Anti-discrimination laws in the provision of goods and services	No / Yes (Only in some cities and counties)
Anti-discrimination laws in schools and colleges	No / Yes (Only in some cities and counties)
LGBT Anti-bullying law in schools and colleges	No (Local school districts forbidden from enumerating protected classes of children)
Hate Crime law inclusive of Sexual Orientation and Gender Identity	Yes
Same-sex marriages	Yes (Since 2015)
Stepchild adoption by same-sex couples	Yes
Joint adoption by same-sex couples	Yes
Lesbian, gay and bisexual people allowed to serve openly in the military	Yes (Since 2011)
Transgender people allowed to serve openly in the military	Yes / No (Most Transgender personnel allowed to serve openly since 2021)
Transvestites allowed to serve openly in the military	No
Intersex people allowed to serve openly in the military	/ Yes (Current DoD policy bans "Hermaphrodites" from serving or enlisting in the military)
Right to change legal gender	Yes (Requires SRS)
State Medicaid policy inclusive of transition for transgender people	No (Explicitly exclusive of such medical procedures, and blocks access to transitional medical procedures for transgender youth)
Conversion therapy banned on minors	No
Access to IVF for lesbian couples	Yes
Surrogacy arrangements legal for gay male couples	Yes
MSMs allowed to donate blood	Yes (Since 2023)

== See also ==
- PROMO
