= History of conversion therapy =

The history of conversion therapy can be divided broadly into three periods: an early Freudian period; a period of mainstream approval, when the mental health establishment became the "primary superintendent" of sexuality; and a post-Stonewall period where the mainstream medical profession disavowed conversion therapy.

During the earliest parts of psychoanalytic history, analysts granted that homosexuality was non-pathological in certain cases, and the ethical question of whether it ought to be changed was discussed. By the 1920s analysts assumed that homosexuality was pathological and that attempts to treat it were appropriate, although psychoanalytic opinion about changing homosexuality was largely pessimistic. Those forms of homosexuality that were considered perversions were usually held to be incurable. Analysts' tolerant statements about homosexuality arose from recognition of the difficulty of achieving change. Beginning in the 1930s and continuing for roughly twenty years, major changes occurred in how analysts viewed homosexuality, which involved a shift in the rhetoric of analysts, some of whom felt free to ridicule and abuse their gay patients.

== Europe ==
=== Richard von Krafft-Ebing ===
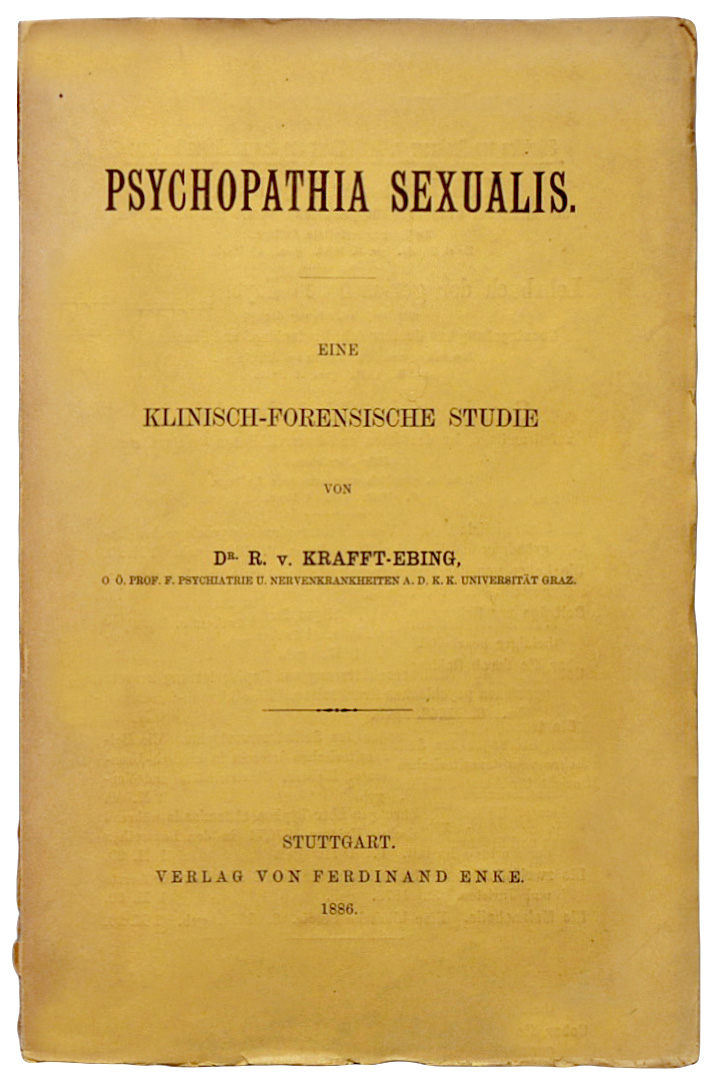
The first edition of Psychopathia Sexualis (1886)

Richard von Krafft-Ebing was a German-Austrian psychiatrist and one of the founders of scientific sexology. His influential 1886 work Psychopathia Sexualis included a discussion of methods for curing homosexuality through hypnosis. Psychopathia Sexualis was widely translated and was extremely influential in promoting the model of homosexuality as a pathology.

Krafft-Ebing rejected castration as a cure for homosexuality, and opposed the internment of gay people in asylums except in cases involving sex crimes. He believed that homosexuality could either be inborn or acquired, and that it could very rarely be treated through preventing masturbation and curing the neuroses "arising out of the unhygienic conditions of sexual life," but that hypnosis was the "only means of salvation" in most cases. He described three cases in which he believed hypnotism had proved satisfactory.

Krafft-Ebing criticized several objections to the medical treatment of homosexuality, asserting that it could be effective. In his view, physicians had a duty to provide treatment if requested, and refusing treatment would allow "tainted individuals to propagate their perversions." Later editions of Psychopathia Sexualis included an increased number of autobiographies by gay people who made it clear that they did not wish to change their sexual orientation.

=== Eugen Steinach ===
Eugen Steinach (1861–1944) was a Viennese physiologist and pioneer in endocrinology. Steinach theorized that testosterone was responsible for determining sexuality, and transplanted testicles into gay men in attempts to change their sexual orientation. Sigmund Freud cautioned that Steinach's transplant procedures would not necessarily enable a generally applicable therapy, as such procedures could only be effective in changing male homosexuality in cases where it was strongly associated with physical characteristics typical of women, and that no similar treatment could be applied to lesbianism. Steinach said that his research had "thrown a strong light on the organic determinants of homo-eroticism", but his procedure was doomed to failure because the immune system rejects transplanted glands, and it was eventually discredited as ineffective and often harmful.

=== Sigmund Freud ===
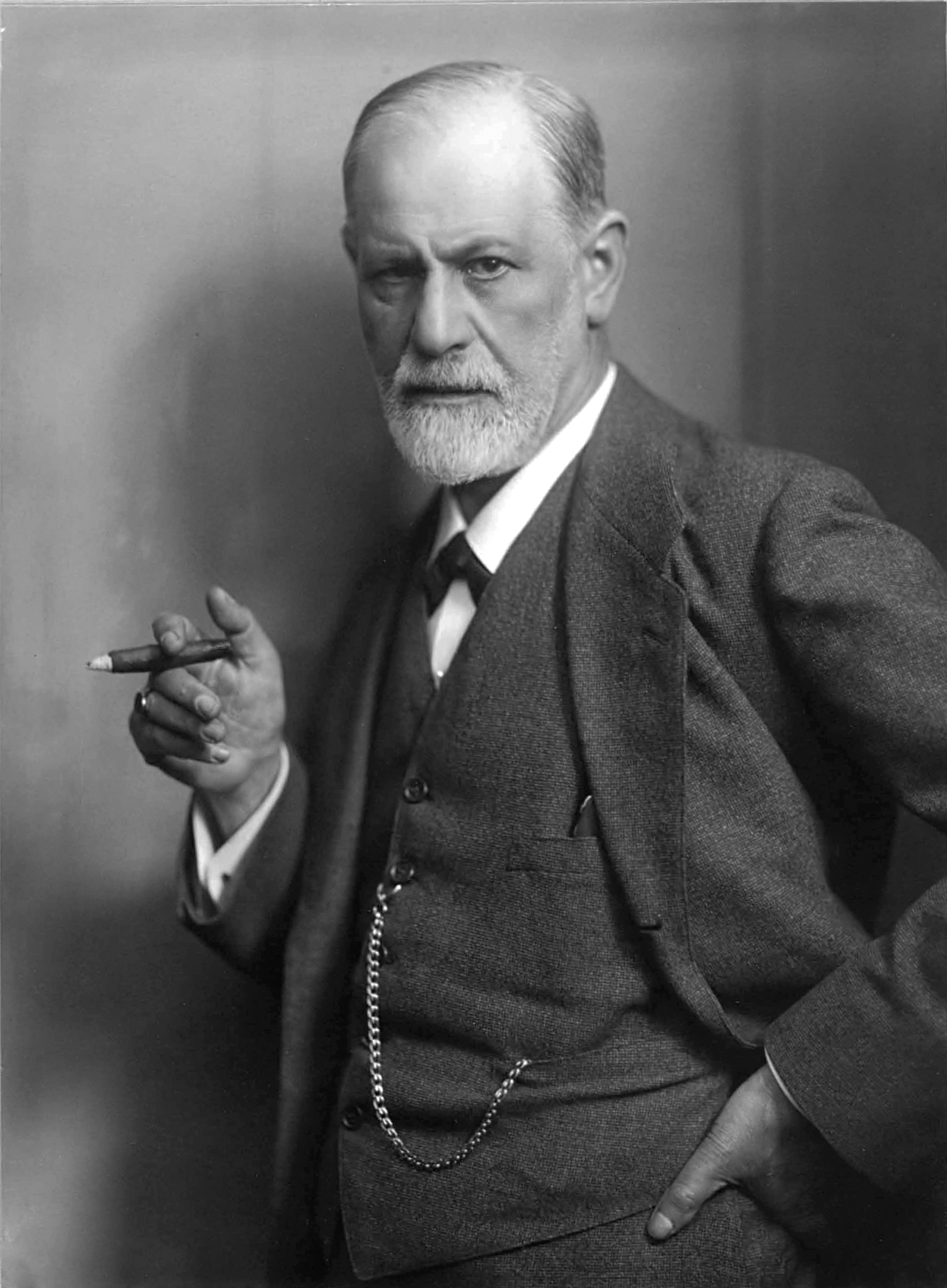
Freud (1856–1939) was skeptical of the possibility of therapeutic conversion.

Sigmund Freud was an Austrian neurologist and the founder of psychoanalysis. Freud claimed that homosexuality could sometimes be removed through hypnotic suggestion.

In his 1920 paper "The Psychogenesis of a Case of Homosexuality in a Woman", Freud described a young lesbian who had entered therapy because her parents wanted the condition changed. In his view, change was unlikely because of the circumstances under which she entered therapy, and because homosexuality was not an illness or neurotic conflict. Freud wrote that changing homosexuality was only possible under unusually favourable conditions, observing that "to convert a fully developed homosexual into a heterosexual does not offer much more prospect of success than the reverse". Success to Freud meant making heterosexual feeling possible, not eliminating homosexual feelings.

Freud found that gay people could rarely be convinced that heterosexual sex would provide them with the same pleasure they derived from homosexual sex. Patients often only wanted to become heterosexual to avoid social disapproval, which Freud considered a superficial and insufficient motive for change. Some, he said, might have no real desire to become heterosexual, seeking treatment only to convince themselves that they had done everything possible to change, leaving them free to return to homosexuality after the failure they expected.

In 1935, a mother asked Freud to treat her son. Freud replied in a letter that later became famous:

I gather from your letter that your son is a homosexual. [...] it is nothing to be ashamed of, no vice, no degradation; it cannot be classified as an illness; we consider it to be a variation of the sexual function, produced by a certain arrest of sexual development. [...] By asking me if I can help [your son], you mean, I suppose, if I can abolish homosexuality and make normal heterosexuality take its place. The answer is, in a general way we cannot promise to achieve it. In a certain number of cases we succeed in developing the blighted germs of heterosexual tendencies, which are present in every homosexual; in the majority of cases it is no more possible. It is a question of the quality and the age of the individual. The result of treatment cannot be predicted.

=== Sándor Ferenczi ===
Sándor Ferenczi was an influential Hungarian psychoanalyst. Ferenczi hoped to eliminate some kinds of homosexuality entirely, but was content in practice with reducing what he considered gay men's hostility to women, along with the urgency of their homosexual desires, and with trying to make them attracted to and potent with women. In his view, a gay man who was confused about his sexual identity and felt himself to be "a woman with the wish to be loved by a man" was not a promising candidate for conversion. Ferenczi believed that complete cures of homosexuality might become possible in the future when psychoanalytic technique had been improved.

=== Melanie Klein ===
Melanie Klein was a pupil of Ferenczi. In 1932 she published her seminal book The Psycho-Analysis of Children, based on lectures given to the British Psychoanalytical Society in the 1920s. Klein claimed that entry into the Oedipus Complex is based on mastery of primitive anxiety from the oral and anal stages. If these tasks are not performed properly, developments in the Oedipal stage will be unstable. Complete analysis of patients with such unstable developments would require uncovering these early concerns. The analysis of homosexuality required dealing with paranoid trends based on the oral stage. The Psycho-Analysis of Children ends with the analysis of a gay man. Klein claimed that this subject illustrated pathologies that enter into all forms of homosexuality: a gay man idealizes "the good penis" of his partner, to allay the fear of attack he feels due to having projected his paranoid hatred onto the imagined "bad penis" of his mother as an infant. She stated that the subject's homosexual behaviour diminished after he overcame his need to adore the "good penis" of an idealized man. This was made possible by his recovering his belief in the "good mother" and his ability to sexually gratify her with his good penis and plentiful semen.

=== Anna Freud ===
Sigmund Freud's daughter, Anna Freud, became an influential psychoanalytic theorist in the UK. She reported the successful treatment of homosexuals as neurotics in a series of unpublished lectures, and in 1949, she published "Some Clinical Remarks Concerning the Treatment of Cases of Male Homosexuality" in the International Journal of Psychoanalysis. In her view, it was important to pay attention to the interaction of passive and active homosexual fantasies and strivings, the original interplay of which, she believed, prevented adequate identification with the father. The patient should be told that his choice of a passive partner allows him to enjoy a passive or receptive mode, while his choice of an active partner allows him to recapture his lost masculinity. She claimed that these interpretations would reactivate repressed castration anxieties, and childhood narcissistic grandiosity and its complementary fear of dissolving into nothing during heterosexual intercourse would come with the renewal of heterosexual potency.

In 1951, Anna Freud published "Clinical Observations on the Treatment of Male Homosexuality" in The Psychoanalytic Quarterly and "Homosexuality" in the American Psychoanalytic Association Bulletin. In these articles, she insisted on the attainment of full object-love of the opposite sex as a requirement for cure of homosexuality. That same year she gave a lecture about treatment of homosexuality which was criticised by Edmund Bergler, who emphasised the oral fears of patients and minimized the importance of the phallic castration fears she had discussed.

In 1956, Anna Freud recommended that a journalist preparing an article about psychoanalysis for The Observer of London not quote Sigmund Freud's 1935 letter to the American mother, on the grounds that "nowadays we can cure many more homosexuals than was thought possible in the beginning. The other reason is that readers may take this as a confirmation that all analysis can do is to convince patients that their defects or 'immoralities' do not matter and that they should be happy with them. That would be unfortunate."

=== Vote by European parliament in March 2018 ===
In March 2018, a majority of 435 against 109 representatives in the European parliament passed a resolution condemning conversion therapy and urging European Union member states to ban the practice.

=== Albania ===
In May 2020, Albania became the third European country (after Malta (2016) and Germany (2020)) to ban conversion therapy or any pseudo-therapeutic attempts to change a person's sexual orientation or gender identity.

=== Germany ===
On 7 May 2020, German parliament Bundestag banned nationwide conversion therapy for minors until 18 years and forbids advertising of conversion therapy. It also forbids conversion therapy for adults, if they are decided by force, fraud or pressure.

=== Malta ===
On 6 December 2016, Malta became the first country in the European Union to prohibit the use of conversion therapy.

=== United Kingdom ===
In 2007, the Royal College of Psychiatrists, the main professional organisation of psychiatrists in the UK, issued a report stating that: "Evidence shows that LGB people are open to seeking help for mental health problems. However, they may be misunderstood by therapists who regard their homosexuality as the root cause of any presenting problem such as depression or anxiety. Unfortunately, therapists who behave in this way are likely to cause considerable distress. A small minority of therapists will even go so far as to attempt to change their client's sexual orientation. This can be deeply damaging. Although there are now a number of therapists and organisations in the US and in the UK that claim that therapy can help homosexuals to become heterosexual, there is no evidence that such change is possible."

Conversion therapy is legal in the United Kingdom. The Conservative Party promised in 2018 as part of its LGBT Action Plan to make it illegal. On 8 March (International Women's Day) 2021, the UK parliament held a debate on conversion therapy where Parliamentary Under-Secretary of State for Equalities Kemi Badenoch gave no timeline for legislation, did not use the word ban, suggested there may be religious exemptions and did not mention adult conversion therapy. In response to accusations of lack of action by the government, a member of the government's LGBT+ advisory panel, Jayne Ozanne, resigned. In April 2021, after another two members of the panel quit over lack of action on banning conversion therapy, Liz Truss, the equalities minister, disbanded the panel. On 11 May, in the Queen's Speech, the government stated its intention that conversion therapy should become a banned practice throughout England and Wales.

== United States ==
=== 20th century ===
Psychoanalysis started to receive recognition in the United States in 1909, when Sigmund Freud delivered a series of lectures at Clark University in Massachusetts at the invitation of G. Stanley Hall. In 1913, Abraham Brill wrote "The Conception of Homosexuality", which he published in the Journal of the American Medical Association and read before the American Medical Association's annual meeting. Brill criticised physical treatments for homosexuality such as bladder washing, rectal massage, and castration, along with hypnosis, but referred approvingly to Freud and Sadger's use of psychoanalysis, calling its results "very gratifying". Since Brill understood curing homosexuality as restoring heterosexual potency, he claimed that he had cured his patients in several cases, even though many remained homosexual.

Wilhelm Stekel, an Austrian, published his views on treatment of homosexuality, which he considered a disease, in the American Psychoanalytic Review in 1930. Stekel believed that "success was fairly certain" in changing homosexuality through psychoanalysis provided that it was performed correctly and the patient wanted to be treated. In 1932, The Psychoanalytic Quarterly published a translation of Helene Deutsch's paper "On Female Homosexuality". Deutsch reported her analysis of a lesbian, who did not become heterosexual as a result of treatment, but who managed to achieve a "positive libidinal relationship" with another woman. Deutsch indicated that she would have considered heterosexuality a better outcome.

Edmund Bergler was the most important psychoanalytic theorist of homosexuality in the 1950s. He was vociferous in his opposition to Alfred Kinsey. Kinsey's work, and its reception, led Bergler to develop his own theories for treatment, which were essentially to "blame the victim", in the evaluation of Jennifer Terry, associate professor of Woman's Studies. Bergler claimed that if gay people wanted to change, and the right therapeutic approach was taken, then they could be cured in 90% of cases. Bergler used confrontational therapy in which gay people were punished in order to make them aware of their masochism. Bergler openly violated professional ethics to achieve this, breaking patient confidentiality in discussing the cases of patients with other patients, bullying them, calling them liars and telling them they were worthless. He insisted that gay people could be cured. Bergler confronted Kinsey because Kinsey thwarted the possibility of cure by presenting homosexuality as an acceptable way of life, which was the basis of the gay rights activism of the time. Bergler popularised his views in the United States in the 1950s using magazine articles and books aimed at non-specialists.

In 1951, the mother who wrote to Freud asking him to treat her son sent Freud's response to the American Journal of Psychiatry, in which it was published. The 1952 first edition of the American Psychiatric Association's Diagnostic and Statistical Manual of Mental Disorders (DSM-I) classified homosexuality as a mental disorder.

During the three decades between Freud's death in 1939 and the Stonewall riots in 1969, conversion therapy received approval from most of the psychiatric establishment in the United States. In 1962, Irving Bieber et al. published Homosexuality: A Psychoanalytic Study of Male Homosexuals, in which they concluded that "although this change may be more easily accomplished by some than by others, in our judgment a heterosexual shift is a possibility for all homosexuals who are strongly motivated to change".

In 1961, Richard Green (sexologist) and John Money published a paper titled "Effeminacy in Prepubertal Boys," which looked at eleven young people assigned male at birth who were referred for their "excessive and persistent attempts to dress in the clothes of the opposite gender, constant display of gestures and mannerisms of the opposite sex, preference for play and other activities of the opposite sex, or a stated desire to be a member of the opposite sex." They recommended that parents "Look for insidious and irrational ways in which parents may be unwittingly encouraging girlishness and penalizing their son for developing boyishly. [...] Both [parents] should convey to their son their whole-hearted approval of his present and future masculine behavior and sexuality." The paper conflated gender identity, gender expression and sexual orientation, viewing effeminacy in boys as a problem to be fixed so as not to lead to adult "homosexuality and transvestism."

In 1969, there was a riot at the Stonewall Bar in New York after a police raid. The Stonewall riot acquired symbolic significance for the gay rights movement and came to be seen as the opening of a new phase in the struggle for gay liberation. Following these events, conversion therapy came under increasing attack. Activism against conversion therapy increasingly focused on the DSM's designation of homosexuality as a psychopathology. In 1973, after years of criticism from gay activists and bitter dispute among psychiatrists, the American Psychiatric Association removed homosexuality as a mental disorder from the Diagnostic and Statistical Manual of Mental Disorders. Supporters of the change used evidence from researchers such as Kinsey and Evelyn Hooker. Psychiatrist Robert Spitzer, a member of the APA's Committee on Nomenclature, played an important role in the events that led to this decision. Critics argued that it was a result of pressure from gay activists, and demanded a referendum among voting members of the Association. The referendum was held in 1974 and the APA's decision was upheld by a 58% majority.

In 1974, George Rekers and Ole Ivar Lovaas published the article "Behavioral Treatment of Deviant Sex-Role Behaviors in a Male Child." The article cited Green and Money as a source of the "growing evidence that childhood cross-gender manifestations are indicative of later adult sexual abnormalities; e.g., transvestism, transsexualism, or some forms of homosexuality." It noted that many transgender women and gay men reported their "cross-gender behaviors began in early childhood" and the research showed it was difficult or impossible to shift in adults; the authors felt the best way to prevent "future sexual deviance", or at least make it unlikely as possible, was to correct gender noncomforming behavior at a young age. The method the paper detailed was a token based reinforcement system administered by the parents which rewarded gender conformity and punished deviancy. Blue chips were a sign of good behavior and could be swapped for chocolate bars, red chips were a sign of bad behavior and resulted in isolation and beatings. The child with "cross-gender identification" who was featured in the paper and appeared in many later works published by Rekers as proof of successful treatment committed suicide at 38.

The APA removed ego-dystonic homosexuality from the DSM-III-R in 1987 and opposes the diagnosis of either homosexuality or ego-dystonic homosexuality as any type of disorder.

Joseph Nicolosi had a significant role in the development of conversion therapy as early as the 1990s, publishing his first book, Reparative Therapy of Male Homosexuality, in 1991. In 1992, Nicolosi, with Charles Socarides and Benjamin Kaufman, founded the National Association for Research & Therapy of Homosexuality (NARTH), an organization that opposed the mainstream medical view of homosexuality and aimed to "make effective psychological therapy available to all homosexual men and women who seek change". NARTH has operated under the name "Alliance for Therapeutic Choice and Scientific Integrity" (ATCSI) since 2014.

In 1998, Christian right groups including the Family Research Council and the American Family Association spent $600,000 on advertising promoting conversion therapy. John Paulk and his then wife Anne featured in full-page newspaper spreads.

=== 21st century ===
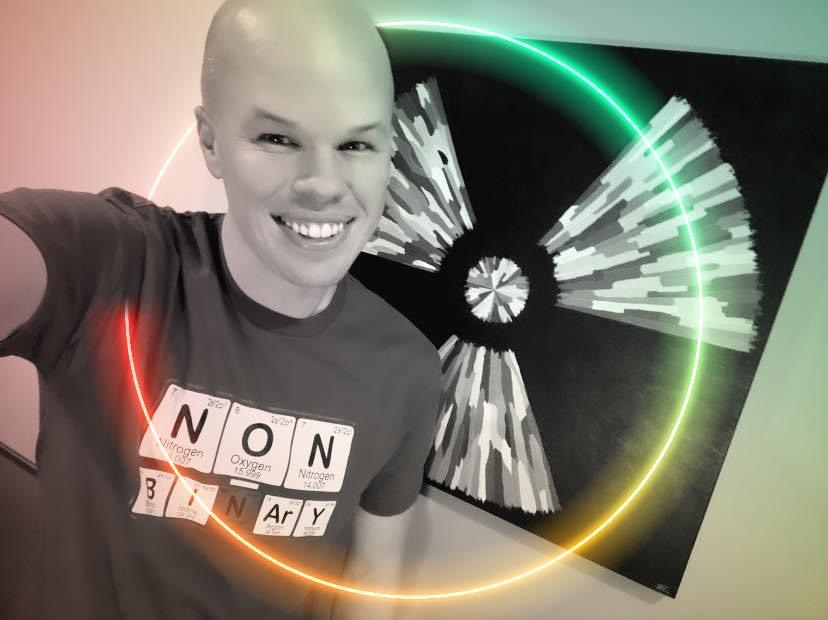
A survivor and outspoken critic of conversion therapy, in November 2014, Sam Brinton was one of the first two individuals to testify before the UN Committee Against Torture regarding the practice.

United States Surgeon General David Satcher in 2001 issued a report stating that "there is no valid scientific evidence that sexual orientation can be changed". The same year, a study by Robert Spitzer concluded that some highly motivated individuals whose orientation is predominantly homosexual can become predominantly heterosexual with some form of reparative therapy. Spitzer based his findings on structured interviews with 200 self-selected individuals (143 men, 57 women). He told The Washington Post that the study "shows some people can change from gay to straight, and we ought to acknowledge that". Spitzer's study caused controversy and attracted media attention. Spitzer recanted his study in 2012, and apologized to the gay community for making unproven claims of the efficacy of reparative therapy, calling it his only professional regret.

The American Psychoanalytic Association spoke against NARTH in 2004, stating "that organization does not adhere to our policy of nondiscrimination and [...] their activities are demeaning to our members who are gay and lesbian". The same year, a survey of members of the American Psychological Association rated reparative therapy as "certainly discredited", though the authors warn that the results should be interpreted carefully as an initial step, not as a final deliberation.

The American Psychological Association in 2007 convened a task force to evaluate its policies regarding reparative therapy.

In 2008, the organizers of an APA panel on the relationship between religion and homosexuality canceled the event after gay activists objected that "conversion therapists and their supporters on the religious right use these appearances as a public relations event to try and legitimize what they do".

In 2009, American Psychological Association stated that it "encourages mental health professionals to avoid misrepresenting the efficacy of sexual orientation change efforts by promoting or promising change in sexual orientation when providing assistance to individuals distressed by their own or others' sexual orientation and concludes that the benefits reported by participants in sexual orientation change efforts can be gained through approaches that do not attempt to change sexual orientation".

The ethics guidelines of major mental health organizations in the United States vary from cautionary statements to recommendations that conversion therapy be prohibited (American Psychiatric Association) to recommendations against referring patients to those who practice it (American Counseling Association). In a letter dated 23 February 2011 to the Speaker of the U.S. House of Representatives, the Attorney General of the United States stated "while sexual orientation carries no visible badge, a growing scientific consensus accepts that sexual orientation is a characteristic that is immutable".

Gay rights groups and other groups concerned with mental health fear that reparative therapy can increase the chances of depression and suicide. President Barack Obama expressed opposition to the practice in 2015.

== Bibliography ==
- Bayer, Ronald (1987), Homosexuality and American Psychiatry: The Politics of Diagnosis, Princeton: Princeton University Press, ISBN 978-0-691-02837-8
- Bergler, Edmund (10 December 1956), "Curable Disease?", Time, archived from the original on 17 February 2009
- Bergler, Edmund (1962), Homosexuality: disease or way of life?, Collier Books
- Bieber, Irving (1962), Homosexuality: A Psychoanalytic Study of Male Homosexuals, Basic Books Inc
- Drescher, Jack (1998), "I'm Your Handyman: A History of Reparative Therapies", Journal of Homosexuality, 36 (1): 19–42, doi:10.1300/J082v36n01_02, PMID 9670099
- Drescher, Jack; Zucker, Kenneth, eds. (2006), Ex-Gay Research: Analyzing the Spitzer Study and Its Relation to Science, Religion, Politics, and Culture, New York: Harrington Park Press, ISBN 978-1-56023-557-6
- Freud, Sigmund (1991), On Sexuality: Volume 7, London: Penguin Books, ISBN 978-0-14-013797-2
- Freud, Ernst L. (1992), Letters of Sigmund Freud, New York: Dover Publications, Inc, ISBN 978-0-486-27105-7
- Gay, Peter (2006), Freud: A Life for Our Time, London: Papermac, ISBN 978-0333486382
- Jones, Ernest (1955), The Life and Work of Sigmund Freud, Volume 2, New York: Basic Books
- Johnson, Chris (12 May 2008), Robinson backs out of symposium on "ex-gays", Washington Blade, archived from the original on 2 May 2008
- Katz, Jonathan (1976), Gay American History: Lesbians and Gay Men in the U.S.A., New York: Crowell, ISBN 978-0690005103
- Money, John; Green, Richard (February 1961), "Effeminacy in Prepubertal Boys", Pediatrics, 27 (2): 286–291, doi:10.1542/peds.27.2.286, S2CID 245091693
- Norcross, John C.; Koocher, Gerald P.; Garofalo, Ariele (October 2006), "Discredited Psychological Treatments and Tests: A Delphi Poll", Professional Psychology: Research and Practice, 37 (5): 515–522, doi:10.1037/0735-7028.37.5.515, S2CID 35414392
- LeVay, Simon (1996), Queer Science: The Use and Abuse of Research into Homosexuality, Cambridge: MIT Press, ISBN 978-0-262-12199-6
- Lewes, Kenneth (1988), The Psychoanalytic Theory of Male Homosexuality, New York: Simon & Schuster, ISBN 978-0-671-62391-3
- O'Connor, Noreen; Ryan, Joanna (1993), Wild Desires and Mistaken Identities: Lesbianism and Psychoanalysis, London: Virago, ISBN 978-1-85381-303-0
- Plowman, William (12 May 2008), Homosexuality Panel Squelched by Gay Activists, NPR
- Rekers, George A.; Lovaas, O. Ivar (1974), "Behavioral Treatment of Deviant Sex-Role Behaviors in a Male Child", Journal of Applied Behavior Analysis, 7 (2): 173–190, doi:10.1901/jaba.1974.7-173, PMC 1311956, PMID 4436165
- Spitzer, Robert L. (October 2003), "Can Some Gay Men and Lesbians Change Their Sexual Orientation? 200 Participants Reporting a Change from Homosexual to Heterosexual Orientation", Archives of Sexual Behavior, 32 (5): 403–417, discussion 419–72, doi:10.1023/A:1025647527010, PMID 14567650, S2CID 5650540
- Stanton, Martin (1991), Sandor Ferenczi: Reconsidering Active Intervention, Northvale: Jason Aronson Inc, ISBN 978-0-87668-569-3
- Terry, Jennifer (1999), An American Obsession: Science, Medicine and the Place of Homosexuality in Modern Society, Chicago: Chicago University Press, ISBN 978-0226793665
- Young-Bruehl, Elisabeth (1988), Anna Freud, New York: Summit Books, ISBN 978-0-671-68751-9
- Yoshino, Kenji (2002), "Covering", Yale Law Journal, 111 (4): 769–939, doi:10.2307/797566, JSTOR 797566
