= National Center for Law & Policy =

The National Center for Law & Policy is an American conservative Christian non-profit law firm that "focuses on the protection and promotion of religious freedom, the sanctity of life, traditional marriage, parental rights, and other civil liberties." Its president is Dean Broyles. It is not related to the similarly named National Legal and Policy Center.

An example of its work was the unsuccessful attempt to remove yoga classes from elementary schools operated by the Encinitas Union School District in California.
