= Pray Away =

2021 American documentary film

- Promotional release poster
- Directed by: Kristine Stolakis
- Produced by: Kristine Stolakis; Anya Rous; Jessica Devaney
- Cinematography: Melissa Langer
- Edited by: Carla Gutierrez
- Music by: Laura Karpman; Nora Kroll-Rosenbaum
- Production companies: Blumhouse Television; Multitude Films; Cinereach; Artemis Rising; Ryan Murphy Productions; Chicken & Egg Pictures; Tribeca Film Institute; Secret Sauce Media; Naked Edge Films; Lamplighter Films; Catapult Film Fund
- Distributed by: Netflix
- Release dates: June 16, 2021 (Tribeca); August 3, 2021 (United States)
- Running time: 101 minutes
- Country: United States
- Language: English

Pray Away is a 2021 American documentary film produced and directed by Kristine Stolakis. It follows survivors of conversion therapy, and former leaders. Jason Blum and Ryan Murphy serve as executive producers.

It had its world premiere at the Tribeca Film Festival on June 16, 2021. It was released on August 3, 2021, by Netflix.

== Synopsis ==
The film follows survivors and former leaders of conversion therapy, as some leaders grapple with their actions against others, while others come out.

== Release ==
Pray Away had its world premiere at the Tribeca Film Festival on June 16, 2021. Prior to, Netflix acquired distribution rights to the film. It also screened at AFI Docs on June 24, 2021. It was previously set to screen at the Tribeca Film Festival in April 2020, and the Telluride Film Festival prior to their cancellations. It was released on August 3, 2021.

== Critical reception ==
On review aggregator website Rotten Tomatoes, Pray Away holds an approval rating of 94% based on 32 reviews, with an average rating of 8.40/10. The site's critics consensus reads, "Pray Away presents a compassionate picture of the damage wrought by so-called conversion therapy – on its subjects as well as its proponents". On Metacritic, the film has a weighted average of 71 out of 100 based on 6 critics, indicating "generally favorable reviews".

=== Accolades ===
Year	Award	Category	Recipient(s)	Result	Ref.
2022	GLAAD Media Awards	Outstanding Documentary	Pray Away	Nominated	
2022	The Queerties Awards	The Queerty Award for Documentary	Pray Away	Nominated	
