= Conversion therapy =

Pseudoscientific attempts to change sexual orientation or gender identity

Conversion therapy equaldex

Legality of conversion therapy: Criminal ban on conversion therapy Medical ban on conversion therapy No ban on conversion therapy

Conversion therapy is the pseudoscientific practice of attempting to change an individual's sexual orientation, romantic orientation, gender identity, or gender expression to align with heterosexual and cisgender norms. Conversion therapy is ineffective at changing a person's sexual orientation or gender identity and frequently causes significant long-term psychological harm. The position of evidence-based medicine and clinical guidance is that sexualities like homosexuality and bisexuality as well as gender variance are natural and healthy aspects of human sexuality and gender identity.

When performed, conversion therapy may constitute fraud; when performed on minors it is considered to be a form of child abuse. It has been described by experts as torture; cruel, inhuman, or degrading treatment; and contrary to human rights. Laws on conversion therapy vary, ranging from constitutional protection to a criminal offense.

Conversion therapy often consists of methods that involve, but are not limited to: talk therapy, aversion therapy, brain surgery, chemical castration, surgical castration, hypnosis, psychoanalysis, corrective rape, and various religious practices, including prayer and exorcism.

== Terminology ==
Medical professionals and activists consider "conversion therapy" a misnomer, as it does not constitute a legitimate form of therapy. Alternative terms include "sexual orientation change efforts" (SOCE) and "gender identity change efforts" (GICE). Together they are referred to as "sexual orientation and gender identity change efforts" (SOGICE), or "sexual orientation and gender identity or expression change efforts" (SOGIECE).

According to researcher Douglas C. Haldeman, SOCE and GICE should be considered together because both rest on the assumption "that gender-related behavior consistent with the individual's birth sex is normative and anything else is unacceptable and should be changed". The American Psychological Association stated in a 2021 resolution that some parts of SOCE also met their definition of GICE, and "intense focus" on gender-normative "conformity is a frequent characteristic of SOCE".

"Reparative therapy" may refer to conversion therapy in general, or to a subset thereof. Some sources prefer the term "conversion practices" to "conversion therapy", on the grounds that the practices in question are not actually therapeutic.

Advocates of conversion therapy do not necessarily use the term either, instead using phrases such as "healing from sexual brokenness" and "struggling with same-sex attraction".

=== Evolving phraseology ===
A common term found throughout conversion therapy practices is "same-sex attraction" with various phrases or words connected to it.

The term "same-sex attraction disorder" (SSAD), or sometimes "same-sex attachment disorder" was coined by Richard Fitzgibbon in the 1990s as a replacement for the term gay and the "ex-gay movement" and subsequently popularized in the 2000s by Richard A. Cohen who, in his book Coming Out Straight, detailed the phrase and invented "diagnosis" that tried to pathologize homosexuality as a condition, concluding that "Homosexuality is a Same-Sex Attachment Disorder." The term was picked up by the ex-gay movement in scripts such as "I used to be gay, but I don't think of myself as gay anymore. Now I just experience same-sex attraction."

A 2020 report by ILGA tracking bans on conversion therapy worldwide explained that in many countries where "conversion therapy" has been banned, "proponents had to reshape and adapt the way in which they present and offer their 'treatment'." The report further explains that many proponents of "conversion therapy" try to expressly distance themselves from the term "conversion therapy" or saying they support homosexuality or gender variance and referring to their alternative terminology as being something different. The report describes this effort to "make these pseudo-scientific practices 'a constant moving target'."

The report listed a series of common terms used by proponents of "conversion therapy" for their "services" to provide assistance with "unwanted same-sex attraction"; promoting a "healthy sexuality", addressing "sexual brokenness"; helping clients explore their "gender confusion".

In 2022, the Global Project Against Hate and Extremism (GPAHE) began tracking terms related to conversion therapy online in a report titled Conversion Therapy Online: The Ecosystem. The report documents practices, techniques and phraseology used by groups providing "conversion therapy" under various names to refer to the practice itself, as well as common phrases such as "same-sex attracted" in relation to conversion therapy targeted at LGBTQ people, in particular gay men and transgender people.

In January 2024, GPAHE published an updated report for 2023, highlighting that many social media platforms and search engines are still serving a lot of content related to conversion therapy. Listing examples, using the search term "overcoming same-sex attraction" on YouTube led to results from religious and non-religious groups serving videos targeting gay and transgender people, such as videos titled "Former LGBTQers Testify: If You No Longer Want to be Gay or Transgender, You Don't Have to Be."

In 2022, GPAHE also started creating an ongoing tracking project on organizations connected to the promotion of "conversion therapy" practices online titled Conversion Therapy Online: The Players to document the actors involved in these activities and show the interconnectedness. The report highlights some larger groups at the center of these efforts such as London-based International Federation for Therapeutic and Counseling Choice (IFTCC), chaired by Mike Davidson, founder of related Core Issues Trust (CIT) and several other organizations involved. IFTCC has been hosting annual conferences since its inception in 2015 with the purpose to connect individuals "seeking help with 'same-sex attraction' and 'gender confusion'" with therapists.

== History ==
=== Sexual orientation change efforts (SOCE) ===
The term homosexual was coined by German-speaking Hungarian writer Karl Maria Kertbeny and was in circulation by the 1880s. Into the middle of the twentieth century, competing views of homosexuality were advanced by psychoanalysis versus academic sexology. Sigmund Freud, the founder of psychoanalysis, viewed homosexuality as a form of arrested development. Later psychoanalysts followed Sandor Rado, who argued that homosexuality was a "phobic avoidance of heterosexuality caused by inadequate early parenting". This line of thinking was popular in psychiatric models of homosexuality based on the prison population or homosexuals seeking treatment. In contrast, sexology researchers such as Alfred Kinsey argued that homosexuality was a normal variation in human development. In 1970, gay activists confronted the American Psychiatric Association, persuading the association to reconsider whether homosexuality should be listed as a disorder. The APA delisted homosexuality in 1973, which contributed to shifts in public opinion on homosexuality.

Despite their lack of scientific backing, some socially or religiously conservative activists continued to argue that if one person's sexuality could be changed, homosexuality was not a fixed class such as race. Borrowing from discredited psychoanalytic ideas about the cause of homosexuality, some of these individuals offered conversion therapy. In 2001, conversion therapy attracted attention when Robert L. Spitzer published a non-peer-reviewed study asserting that some homosexuals could change their sexual orientation. Many researchers made methodological criticisms of the study, and Spitzer later repudiated his own study.

=== Gender identity change efforts (GICE) ===
Gender Identity Change Efforts (GICE) refer to practices of healthcare providers and religious counselors with the goal of attempting to alter a person's gender identity or expression to conform to social norms. Examples include aversion therapy, cognitive restructuring, and psychoanalytic and talk therapies. Western medical-model narratives have historically favored a binary gender model and pathologizing gender diversity and non-conformity. This aided the development and proliferation of GICE.

Early interventions were rooted in psychoanalytic hypotheses. Robert Stoller advanced the theory that gender-nonconforming behavior and expression in children assigned male at birth (AMAB) was caused by being overly close to their mother. Richard Green continued his research; his methods for altering behavior included having the father spend more time with the child and mother less, expecting both to exhibit stereotypical gender roles, and having them praise their child's masculine behaviors, and shame their feminine and gender-nonconforming ones. These interventions resulted in depression in the children and feelings of betrayal from parents that the treatments failed.

In the 1970s, UCLA psychologist Richard Green recruited Ole Ivar Lovaas to adapt the techniques of applied behavior analysis (ABA) to attempt to prevent children from becoming transsexual. Deemed the "Feminine Boy Project", the treatments used operant conditioning to reward gender-conforming behaviors, and punish gender non-conforming behaviors.

Kenneth Zucker at the Centre for Addiction and Mental Health adopted Richard Green's methods, but narrowed the scope to attempting to prevent the child from identifying as transgender by modifying gender behavior and presentation to conform to the expectations of the assigned gender at birth, which he dubbed the "living in your own skin" model. His model used the same interventions as Green with the addition of psychodynamic therapy.

=== Bans on conversion therapy ===
In 2020, the United Nations Independent Expert on sexual orientation and gender identity (IESOGI) published a Report on conversion therapy, which documented global practices on conversion therapy against LGBTQ individuals. In the report, the UN IESOGI called for a global ban on "conversion therapy", as an umbrella term describing various interventions practiced to "cure" people, and to "convert" them from non-heterosexual to heterosexual, and from trans or gender diverse to cisgender. The report highlighted a 2015 US court case from New Jersey, "Ferguson v JONAH'", in which a jury unanimously found the defendants guilty of fraud, claiming they were providing "services that could significantly reduce or eliminate same-sex attraction." In March of 2026, laws prohibiting conversion therapy were struck down by the US Supreme Court.

== Motivations ==
A frequent motivation for adults who pursue conversion therapy is religious beliefs that disapprove of same-sex relations, such as evangelical Christianity, Orthodox Judaism, and conservative interpretations of Islam. These adults prioritize maintaining a good relationship with their family and religious community.

Adolescents who are pressured by their families into undergoing conversion therapy also typically come from a conservative religious background. Youth from families with low socioeconomic status are also more likely to undergo conversion therapy.

== Theories and techniques ==
As societal attitudes toward homosexuality have become more accepting over time, the harshest conversion therapy methods, such as aversion therapy, have become less common. Secular conversion therapy is offered less frequently due to the demedicalization of homosexuality and bisexuality, and religious practitioners have become predominant.

=== Aversion therapy ===
Aversion therapy used on homosexuals and bisexuals included electric shock and nausea-inducing drugs during presentation of same-sex erotic images. Cessation of the aversive stimuli was typically accompanied by the presentation of opposite-sex erotic images, with the objective of strengthening heterosexual feelings. Another method used is the covert sensitization method, which involves instructing recipients to imagine vomiting or receiving electric shocks. Proponents often write that only single-case studies have been conducted to support their methods and that their results cannot be generalized. For example, Haldeman writes that behavioral conditioning studies tend to decrease homosexual feelings but do not increase heterosexual feelings, citing Rangaswami's "Difficulties in arousing and increasing heterosexual responsiveness in a homosexual: A case report", published in 1982, as typical in this respect. Other methods of aversion therapy, in addition to electric shock, included ice baths, freezing, burning via metal coils, and hard labor. The intent was for the subject to associate homosexual feelings with pain and thus result in them being reduced. These methods have been concluded to be ineffective.

Aversion therapy was developed in Czechoslovakia between 1950 and 1962 and in the British Commonwealth from 1961 into the mid-1970s. In the context of the Cold War, Western psychologists ignored the poor results of their Czechoslovak counterparts who had concluded that aversion therapy was not effective by 1961 and recommended decriminalization of homosexuality instead. Some men in the United Kingdom were offered the choice between prison and undergoing aversion therapy. It was also offered to a few British women, but was never the standard treatment for either homosexual men or women.

In the 1970s, behaviorist Hans Eysenck was one of the main advocates of counterconditioning with malaise-inducing drugs and electric shock for homosexuals. He wrote that this therapy was successful in nearly 50% of cases. However, his studies were disputed. Behavior therapists, including Eysenck, used aversive methods. This led to a protest against Eysenck by gay activist Peter Tatchell at a London Medical Group Symposium in 1972. Tatchell said that the therapy promoted by Eysenck was a form of torture. Tatchell denounced Eysenck's form of behavioral therapy as causing depression, suicidal ideation and suicide among gay men who were subjected to it.

=== Brain surgery ===
In the 1940s and 1950s, American neurologist Walter Jackson Freeman II popularized the so-called ice-pick lobotomy as a treatment for homosexuality. He personally performed more than 3,000 lobotomies across 23 US states, of which 2,500 used his transorbital method, despite the fact that he had no formal surgical training. Freeman was banned from performing psychosurgery in 1967.

In West Germany, a type of brain surgery usually involving destruction of the ventromedial nucleus of the hypothalamus was done on some homosexual men during the 1960s and 1970s. The practice was criticized by sexologist Volkmar Sigusch.

=== Castration and transplantation ===
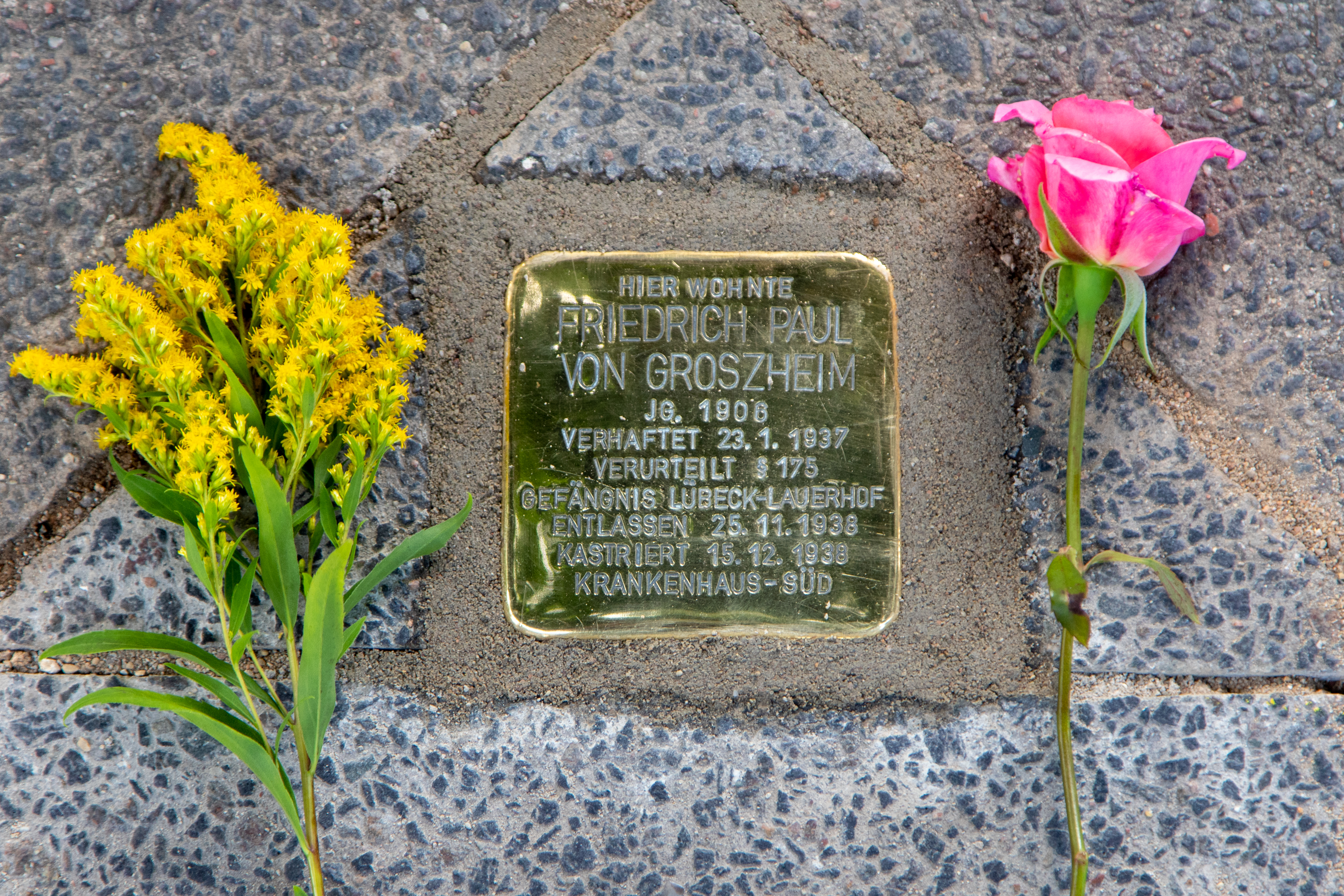
Friedrich-Paul von Groszheim (1908–2006) was spared from a concentration camp after agreeing to castration under pressure in 1938.

In early twentieth-century Germany, experiments were carried out in which homosexual men were subjected to unilateral orchiectomy and testicles of heterosexual men were transplanted. These operations were a complete failure.

Surgical castration of homosexual men was widespread in Europe in the first half of the twentieth century. SS leader Heinrich Himmler ordered homosexual men to be sent to concentration camps because he did not consider a time-limited prison sentence sufficient to eliminate homosexuality. Although theoretically voluntary, some homosexuals were subject to severe pressure and coercion to agree to castration. There was no lower age limit: some boys as young as 16 were castrated. Those who agreed to castration after a Paragraph 175 conviction were exempted from being transferred to a concentration camp after completing their legal sentence. Some concentration camp prisoners were also subjected to castration. An estimated 400 to 800 men were castrated. Endocrinologist Carl Vaernet attempted to change homosexual concentration camp prisoners' sexual orientations by implanting a pellet that released testosterone. Most of the victims, non-consenting prisoners at the Buchenwald concentration camp, died shortly thereafter.

An unknown number of men were castrated in West Germany, and chemical castration was used in other Western countries, notably against Alan Turing in the United Kingdom.

=== Ex-gay/ex-trans ministries ===
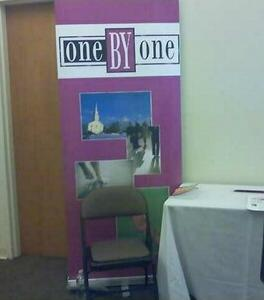
OneByOne booth at a Love Won Out conference

Ex-gay ministries are religious groups that attempt to use religion to eliminate or change queer individuals' sexual orientation. The ex-gay umbrella organization Exodus International in the United States ceased activities in June 2013, and the three-member board issued a statement repudiating its aims and apologizing for the harm its pursuit had caused to queer people. Ex-trans organizations often overlap with ex-gay organizations, frequently portraying trans identity as inherently sinful or against God's design and pathologizing gender variance as the result of trauma, social contagion, or "gender ideology".

=== Hypnosis ===
Hypnosis has been used in conversion therapy since the 19th century, first employed by Richard von Krafft-Ebing and Albert von Schrenck-Notzing. In 1967, Canadian psychiatrist Peter Roper published a case study of treating 15 homosexual individuals—some of whom would probably be considered bisexual by modern standards—with hypnosis. Allegedly, eight showed "marked improvement" (they reportedly lost sexual attraction towards the same sex altogether), four showed mild improvements (decrease of "homosexual tendencies"), and three exhibited no improvement after hypnotic treatment. He concluded that "hypnosis may well produce more satisfactory results than those obtainable by other means", depending on the hypnotic susceptibility of the subjects.

=== Psychoanalysis ===
Haldeman writes that psychoanalytic treatment of homosexuality is exemplified by the work of Irving Bieber and colleagues in Homosexuality: A Psychoanalytic Study of Male Homosexuals. They advocated long-term therapy aimed at resolving the unconscious childhood conflicts that they considered responsible for homosexuality. Haldeman notes that Bieber's methodology has been criticized because it relied upon a clinical sample, the description of the outcomes was based upon subjective therapist impression, and follow-up data were poorly presented. Bieber reported a 27% success frequency from long-term therapy, but only 18% of those deemed successful were exclusively homosexual initially, while 50% had been bisexual. In Haldeman's view, this makes even Bieber's unimpressive claims of success misleading.

Haldeman discusses other psychoanalytic studies of attempts to change homosexuality. Curran and Parr's "Homosexuality: An analysis of 100 male cases", published in 1957, reported no significant increase in heterosexual behavior. Mayerson and Lief's "Psychotherapy of homosexuals: A follow-up study of nineteen cases", published in 1965, reported that half of the 19 subjects included were exclusively heterosexual in behavior four and a half years after treatment; its outcomes were based on patient self-report and had no external validation. In Haldeman's view, those participants in the study who reported change were bisexual at the outset, and its authors wrongly interpreted the capacity for heterosexual sex as a change of sexual orientation.

=== Reparative therapy ===
The term "reparative therapy" has been used as a synonym for conversion therapy generally, but according to Jack Drescher, it more correctly refers to a specific kind of therapy associated with the psychologists Elizabeth Moberly and Joseph Nicolosi. For example, he wrote:

The pursuit of fulfillment through same-sex eroticism is spurred by the fearful anticipation that their masculine self-assertion will inevitably fail and result in humiliation.

The term reparative refers to Nicolosi's postulate that same-sex attraction is a person's unconscious attempt to "self-repair" feelings of inferiority. After California banned conversion practices, Nicolosi argued that "reparative therapy" did not attempt to change sexual orientation directly but instead encouraged exploration into its underlying causes, which he believed was often childhood trauma.

A phone study by Robert Spitzer reported that "about 66 percent of the men respondents and 44 percent of the women were able to function as heterosexuals after the therapy," while conceding that "his subjects did not constitute a study population representative of the gay and lesbian population in the U.S."

=== Marriage therapy ===
Previous editions of the World Health Organization's ICD included sexual relationship disorder, in which a person's sexual orientation or gender identity makes it difficult to form or maintain a relationship with a sexual partner. The belief that their sexual orientation causes problems in their relationship may lead some to turn to a marriage therapist for help to change their sexual orientation. Sexual relationship disorder was removed from ICD-11 after the Working Group on Sexual Disorders and Sexual Health determined that its inclusion was unjustified.

=== Gender exploratory therapy ===
Gender exploratory therapy (GET) is a form of conversion therapy characterized by requiring mandatory extended talk therapy attempting to find pathological roots for gender dysphoria while simultaneously delaying social and medical transition and viewing it as a last resort. Practitioners propose that their patients' dysphoria is caused by factors such as homophobia, social contagion, sexual trauma, and autism. Some practitioners avoid using their patients' chosen names and pronouns while questioning their identification. Commenting on GET in 2022, bioethicist Florence Ashley argued that its framing as an undirected exploration of underlying psychological issues bore similarities to conversion practices, such as "reparative" therapy. States that have banned gender-affirming care for minors in the United States have called expert witnesses to argue that exploratory therapy should be the alternative treatment.

As of 2023, there are no known empirical studies examining psychosocial or medical outcomes following gender exploratory therapy. Concerns have been raised that by not providing an estimated length of time for the therapy, the delays in medical interventions may compound mental suffering in transgender youth, while the gender-affirming care model already promotes gender identity exploration—without favoring any particular identity—and individualized care. GET proponents deny this.

In 2017, Richard Green published a legal strategy that called for circumventing bans on conversion therapy by labelling the practice "gender identity exploration or development". Multiple groups now exist worldwide to promote gender exploratory therapy and have been successful in influencing legal discussions and clinical guidance in some regions. The Gender Exploratory Therapy Association (GETA) asserts that "psychological approaches should be the first-line treatment for all cases of gender dysphoria", that medical interventions for transgender youth are "experimental and should be avoided if possible", and that social transitioning is "risky". All of GETA's leaders are members of Genspect, a "gender-critical" group that promotes GET and argues that gender-affirming care should not be available to those under 25. In late 2023, GETA changed its name to "Therapy First".

GETA also shares a large overlap with the Society for Evidence-Based Gender Medicine (SEGM), which promotes GET as first-line treatment for those under 25. GETA co-founder Lisa Marchiano stated US President Joe Biden's executive order safeguarding trans youth from conversion therapy would have a "chilling effect" on GET practices. GETA also opposed Biden's Title IX changes protecting trans students from discrimination, stating allowing trans youth in restrooms would harm the mental health of their peers. The American College of Pediatricians, (Note: Not to be confused with the American Academy of Pediatrics.) a small group aligned with the Christian Right, has cited numerous studies from SEGM to support the claim that 'gender exploratory therapy' is necessary to restore transgender people's "biological integrity".

== Effects and evaluation ==
There is a scientific consensus that conversion therapy is ineffective at changing a person's sexual orientation.

Conversion therapy can cause significant, long-term psychological harm. This includes significantly higher rates of depression, substance abuse, and other mental health issues in individuals who have undergone conversion therapy than their peers who did not, including a suicide attempt rate nearly twice that of those who did not. After conversion therapy has failed to change someone's sexual orientation or gender identity, participants often feel increased shame that they already felt over their sexual orientation or gender identity.

Modern-day practitioners of conversion therapy—primarily from a conservative religious viewpoint—disagree with evidence-based medicine and clinical guidance that does not view homosexuality and gender variance as unnatural or unhealthy. Advocates of conversion therapy rely heavily on testimonials and retrospective self-reports as evidence of effectiveness. Studies purporting to validate the effectiveness of efforts to change sexual orientation or gender identity have been criticized for methodological flaws.

According to Bailey et al., claims of successful conversion therapy rely upon self reports of success, however these are unreliable and lack objective evidence, and participants in conversion therapy "may be especially susceptible to believing and reporting that therapy has succeeded regardless of its true effectiveness". According to Bailey et al. measures of men's genital arousal patterns could provide relevant evidence to the efficacy of conversion therapy, however existing studies have not supported its effectiveness. For example, a study by Kurt Freund used penile phallometric testing and found that clients’ reported changes in sexual orientation were not supported; and research by Conrad and Wincze (1976) showed that arousal measurements also failed to support claims of success. According to Bailey, although individuals may choose not to act upon their sexual attractions, "there is no good evidence, however, that sexual orientation can be changed with therapy".

In 2020, ILGA World published a world survey and report Curbing Deception listing consequences and life-threatening effects by associating specific public testimonies with different types of methods used to practice conversion therapies.

A 2022 study estimated that conversion therapy of youth in the United States cost $650.16 million annually with an additional $9.5 billion in associated costs such as increased suicide and substance abuse. Youth who undergo conversion therapy from a religious provider have more negative mental health outcomes than those who had consulted a licensed healthcare provider.

A 2022 research by Outright International found out that half the respondents surveyed from Kenya, Nigeria and South Africa had undergone some form of conversion practice. Some of the forms including force and coercion, which inflict severe physical and mental pain and suffering.

== Legal status ==
Map of jurisdictions that have bans on sexual orientation and gender identity change efforts with minors as of January 2025: Criminal prohibition against conversion therapy on the basis of sexual orientation and gender identity Only medical professionals are banned from performing conversion therapy No ban on conversion therapy

Some jurisdictions have criminal bans on the practice of conversion therapy, including Canada, Ecuador, France, Germany, Malta, Mexico and Spain. In other countries, including Albania, Brazil, Chile, Vietnam and Taiwan, medical professionals are barred from practicing conversion therapy.

In some states, lawsuits against conversion therapy providers for fraud have succeeded, but in other jurisdictions those claiming fraud must prove that the perpetrator was intentionally dishonest. Thus, a provider who genuinely believes conversion therapy is effective could not be convicted.

In March 2026, the U.S. Supreme Court held in Chiles v. Salazar that Colorado's prohibition on conversion therapy for minors, as applied to a licensed counselor's talk therapy, was viewpoint discrimination under the First Amendment.

Conversion therapy on minors may amount to child abuse.

=== Human rights ===
In 2020, the International Rehabilitation Council for Torture Victims released an official statement that conversion therapy is torture. The same year, UN Independent Expert on sexual orientation and gender identity, Victor Madrigal-Borloz, said that conversion therapy practices are "inherently discriminatory, that they are cruel, inhuman and degrading treatment, and that depending on the severity or physical or mental pain and suffering inflicted to the victim, they may amount to torture". He recommended that it should be banned across the world. In 2021, Ilias Trispiotis and Craig Purshouse argue that conversion therapy violates the prohibition against degrading treatment under Article 3 of the European Convention on Human Rights, leading to a state obligation to prohibit it. In February 2023 Commissioner for Human Rights, Dunja Mijatović, qualified those practices as "irreconcilable with several guarantees under the European Convention on Human Rights" and having no place in a human rights-based society urging the Member States of the Council of Europe to ban them for both adults and minors, later in July 2023 she advocated for clear actions during a public hearing at the European Parliament studying different approaches to legally ban "conversion therapies" in the European Union. In September 2024 it was reported that the European Union is considering banning "conversion therapies" across its Member States, while a European Citizens' Initiative that started collecting signatures in May 2024 is also calling on the European Commission to outlaw such practices.

== In media ==
Efforts to change sexual orientation have been depicted and discussed in popular culture and various media. Some examples include: Boy Erased, But I'm a Cheerleader, The Miseducation of Cameron Post, Book of Mormon musical, Ratched, and the documentary features Pray Away and Homotherapy: A Religious Sickness.

== Medical views ==
National health organizations around the world have uniformly denounced and criticized sexual orientation and gender identity change efforts. They state that there has been no scientific demonstration of "conversion therapy's" efficacy. They find that conversion therapy is ineffective, risky and can be harmful. Anecdotal claims of cures are counterbalanced by assertions of harm, and the American Psychiatric Association, for example, cautions ethical practitioners under the Hippocratic oath to do no harm and to refrain from attempts at conversion therapy. Furthermore, they state that conversion therapy is harmful and that it often exploits individuals' guilt and anxiety, thereby damaging self-esteem and leading to depression and even suicide. A 2025 study completed by the American Medical Association found that 42% of those subjected to conversion therapy attempted suicide, compared to 5% of those not subjected to these practices. For transgender individuals in particular, exposure to conversion therapy before age 10 is associated with a fourfold increase in the risk of lifetime suicide attempts compared to peers who received other forms of therapy.

There is also concern in the mental health community that the advancement of conversion therapy can cause social harm by disseminating inaccurate views about gender identity, sexual orientation, and the ability of LGBT people to lead happy, healthy lives. Various medical bodies prohibit their members from practicing conversion therapy.

== Public opinion ==
Opinion polls have found that conversion therapy bans enjoy popular support among the U.S. population. Surveys in three states (Florida, New Mexico and Virginia) show support varying between 60% and 75%. According to a 2014 national poll, only 8% of the U.S. population believed conversion therapies to be successful.

A 2020 survey carried out on US adults found majority support for banning conversion therapy for minors. 18% of respondents said it should be legal for minors, 56% said it should be illegal for minors, and 26% said they did not know. The survey also found that LGB contact was positively associated with opposition to conversion therapy.

A 2022 YouGov poll found majority support in England, Scotland, and Wales for a conversion therapy ban for both sexual orientation and gender identity, with opposition ranging from 13 to 15 percent.

== See also ==
- Brainwashing – Methods that purportedly control a person's will, desire, or knowledge
- Christianity and homosexuality
- Corrective rape – Homophobic hate crime
- Deprogramming – Coercive intervention against a person's beliefs
- Forced marriage of LGBTQ people
- Media portrayals of conversion therapy
- Recovering from Religion – Non-profit organization supporting people leaving religion
- Sexual orientation change efforts and the LDS Church

== Bibliography ==
- Bright, Chuck (December 2004), "Deconstructing Reparative Therapy: An Examination of the Processes Involved When Attempting to Change Sexual Orientation", Clinical Social Work Journal, 32 (4): 471–481, doi:10.1007/s10615-004-0543-2, S2CID 189871877
- Cohen, Richard A. (2000). Coming Out Straight: Understanding and Healing Homosexuality. Oakhill Press. ISBN 978-1-886939-41-7.
- Cruz, David B. (July 1999). "Controlling desires: sexual orientation conversion and the limits of knowledge and law". Southern California Law Review. 72 (5): 1297–1400. hdl:10822/925326. PMID 12731502.
- Drescher, Jack (June 1998a), "I'm Your Handyman: A History of Reparative Therapies", Journal of Homosexuality, 36 (1): 19–42, doi:10.1300/J082v36n01_02, PMID 9670099
- Drescher, Jack (2001), "Ethical Concerns Raised When Patients Seek to Change Same-Sex Attractions", Journal of Gay & Lesbian Psychotherapy, 5 (3/4): 183, doi:10.1300/j236v05n03_11, S2CID 146736819
- Drescher, Jack; Zucker, Kenneth, eds. (2006), Ex-Gay Research: Analyzing the Spitzer Study and Its Relation to Science, Religion, Politics, and Culture, New York: Harrington Park Press, ISBN 978-1-56023-557-6
- Drescher, Jack (2000). "Psychoanalytic Therapy and the Gay Man". The American Journal of Psychoanalysis. 60 (2): 191–196. doi:10.1023/a:1001968909523. PMID 10874429.
- Haldeman, Douglas (1991). "Sexual Orientation Conversion Therapy for Gay Men and Lesbians: A Scientific Examination". Homosexuality: Research Implications for Public Policy. pp. 149–160. doi:10.4135/9781483325422.n10. ISBN 978-0-8039-3764-2.
- Haldeman, Douglas C. (2022). "Introduction: A history of conversion therapy, from accepted practice to condemnation". The case against conversion 'therapy': Evidence, ethics, and alternatives. pp. 3–16. doi:10.1037/0000266-001. ISBN 978-1-4338-3711-1. S2CID 243777493.
- Jones, Stanton L.; Yarhouse, Mark A. (2007). Ex-Gays?: A Longitudinal Study of Religiously Mediated Change in Sexual Orientation. InterVarsity Press. ISBN 978-0-8308-2846-3.
- Rivera, David P.; Pardo, Seth T. (2022). "Gender identity change efforts: A summary". In Haldeman, Douglas C. (ed.). The Case Against Conversion Therapy: Evidence, Ethics, and Alternatives. American Psychological Association. pp. 51–68. doi:10.1037/0000266-003. ISBN 978-1-4338-3711-1. S2CID 243776563.
- Rolls, Geoff (2019). Rolls, Geoff (ed.). Classic Case Studies in Psychology. doi:10.4324/9780429294754. ISBN 978-0-429-29475-4.
- Schmidt, Gunter (1985). "Allies and Persecutors". Journal of Homosexuality. 10 (3–4): 127–140. doi:10.1300/J082v10n03_16.
- Schwartz, Michael (25 June 2021). "Homosexuelle im modernen Deutschland: Eine Langzeitperspektive auf historische Transformationen" [Homosexuals in Modern Germany: A Long-Term Perspective on Historical Transformations]. Vierteljahrshefte für Zeitgeschichte (in German). 69 (3): 377–414. doi:10.1515/vfzg-2021-0028. S2CID 235689714.
- Waidzunas, Tom (2016), The Straight Line: How the Fringe Science of Ex-Gay Therapy Reoriented Sexuality, Minneapolis: University of Minnesota Press, ISBN 978-0-8166-9615-4
- Wachsmann, Nikolaus (2015) [2004]. Hitler's Prisons: Legal Terror in Nazi Germany. Yale University Press. ISBN 978-0-300-22829-8.
- Weindling, Paul (2015). Victims and Survivors of Nazi Human Experiments: Science and Suffering in the Holocaust. Bloomsbury Academic. ISBN 978-1-4411-7990-6.
- Whisnant, Clayton J. (2016). Queer Identities and Politics in Germany: A History, 1880–1945. Columbia University Press. ISBN 978-1-939594-10-5.
- Yoshino, Kenji (2002), "Covering", Yale Law Journal, 111 (4): 769–939, doi:10.2307/797566, hdl:20.500.13051/9392, JSTOR 797566, archived from the original on 25 October 2015
- Zinn, Alexander (2020b). "'Das sind Staatsfeinde' Die NS-Homosexuellenverfolgung 1933–1945" ["They are enemies of the state": The Nazi persecution of homosexuals 1933–1945] (PDF). Bulletin des Fritz Bauer Instituts (in German): 6–13. ISSN 1868-4211. Archived (PDF) from the original on 9 October 2022.
