= Open for Service =

Campaign in Indianapolis, Indiana

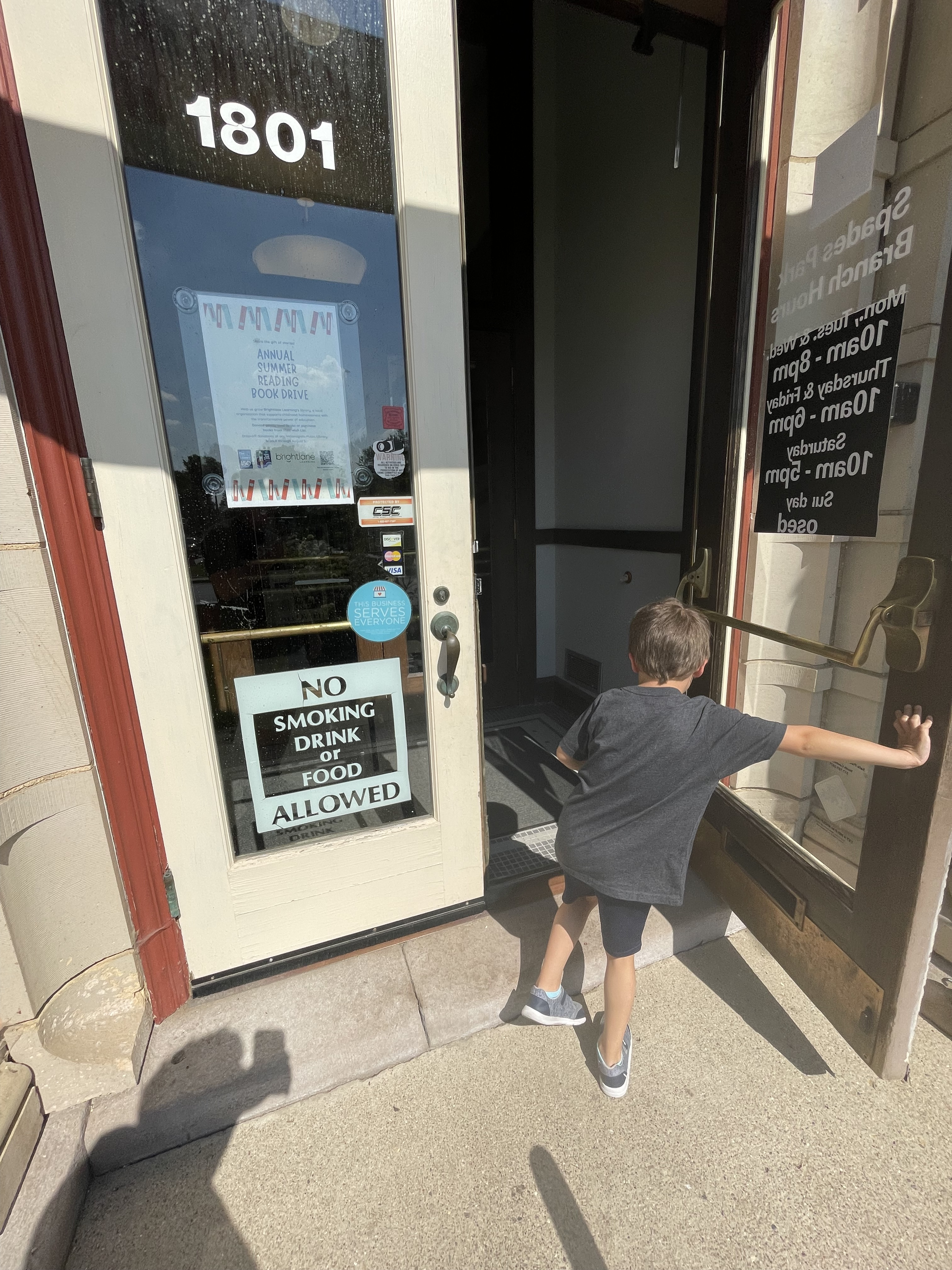
A young patron opens the door at Spades Park Library, with an Open for Service sticker.

Open for Service is a local campaign launched by members of Indiana's business community in response to Indiana's Religious Freedom Restoration Act (RFRA) in 2015. The law, which was perceived as anti-LGBT by critics, was widely opposed by many of Indiana's largest companies, and also led to a boycott of Indiana by activists nationally. The Open for Service campaign created a recognizable blue sticker with the text "This Business Serves Everyone," which were ubiquitously displayed in storefront windows in Indianapolis and elsewhere—in order to allow businesses to self-identify as inclusive, and would not refuse service to customers on the basis of sexual orientation (as RFRA permitted).

Open for Service also maintained an online directory of participating businesses, and raised funds for SCORE, a business mentorship nonprofit. Originally started in Indianapolis, the campaign quickly spread statewide and even nationally, with participating businesses from 23 states within the first 3 weeks.

== Background ==
In early 2015, Indiana's SB 101 was proposed by Governor Mike Pence and Republicans in the state legislature. The proposal was part of a national movement by Republicans in state government as a result of the Supreme Court case Burwell v. Hobby Lobby Stores, Inc., which recognized the religious rights of private businesses. The law was portrayed by supporters as an effort to shield businesses from expressions of religious beliefs, particularly in response to high-profile cases—such as the Arlene's Flowers case and the Masterpiece Cakeshop case—in which businesses were found to have violated the law by refusing service to gay customers.

The bill sparked a national debate on such policies, and led to major boycotts and economic repercussions, such as Angie's List canceling a major expansion that would have created 1,000 jobs in Indiana and a threat to move Gen Con out of state. Within Indianapolis, the state's most populated and Democratic area of the state, many worried about the economic and reputational harm of the law that they widely opposed.

== Launch ==
Open for Service was created by Josh Driver, an Indianapolis business owner, in March 2015, while the law was still being debated. He stated that his motivations were to have positive approach and "focus on businesses that are willing to bake the cakes or be the DJ". Driver had previously organized local efforts to promote marriage equality.

The campaign encouraged local businesses to donate $10 in order to receive the sticker to display and be registered in their online directory. Proceeds from the donation were also donated to a nonprofit business mentorship program. At launch, more than 20 Indianapolis businesses had signed up, including well-known downtown stores such as Silver in the city. The project was registered as a 501(c)(3) nonprofit organization.

== Expansion ==
Originally envisioned as a local effort for Indianapolis businesses affected by the RFRA law, the campaign gained popularity and quickly spread beyond its creators' expectations. Within two weeks, the sticker was being adopted by several businesses in Bloomington and Monroe County. By 2018 Open for Service maintained a database of over 50,000 businesses, with only 5% in Indiana.

In 2020, Driver was named to the Indianapolis Business Journal's "Forty Under 40," and stated "When I was on the verge of giving up, I looked out of the windows of my apartment and the marquee at the Murat said that LiveNation is #openforservice".
