= Religious Freedom Restoration Act (Indiana) =

Act of the State of Indiana

Indiana State Legislature
- Full name: An Act to amend the Indiana Code concerning civil procedure
- Introduced: January 6, 2015
- House voted: March 23, 2015
- Senate voted: February 24, 2015
- Signed into law: March 26, 2015
- Sponsor(s): Timothy Wesco, Jud McMillin, Donald Lehe, Milo E. Smith, Bruce Borders, Dale DeVon, Tim Harman, Bob Heaton, Christopher Judy, Eric Koch, Robert Morris, Alan Morrison, Mike Speedy, Jeffrey Thompson, Thomas Washburne, Matt Lehman, David Frizzell, Randy Frye, Richard Hamm, Curt Nisly, Woody Burton, Anthony Cook, Doug Miller, Jim Lucas, Rhonda Rhoads
- Governor: Mike Pence
- Bill: SB 101 (2015 Session)
- Website: Senate Bill 101 (2015)

Status: Current legislation

The Religious Freedom Restoration Act (RFRA), also known as Indiana Senate Bill 101, is a law in the U.S. state of Indiana, which allows individuals and companies to assert as a defense in legal proceedings that their exercise of religion has been, or is likely to be, substantially burdened.

The bill was approved by a vote of 40–10 and on March 26, 2015, Indiana Governor Mike Pence signed SB 101 into law. The bill is similar to the Arizona SB 1062 vetoed by Governor Jan Brewer in 2014, which would have expanded Arizona's existing RFRA to include corporations.

The law's signing was met with criticism by such organizations as the National Collegiate Athletic Association (NCAA), Tim Cook (CEO of Apple Inc.), Subaru of America, the gamer convention Gen Con, and the Disciples of Christ. Technology company Salesforce.com said it would halt its plans to expand in the state, as did Angie's List. Opponents of the law claim that it is targeted against LGBT (lesbian, gay, bisexual, and transgender) people and other groups. Proponents of the law claim that it protects free exercise of religion and freedom of conscience.

Thousands protested against the policy, in part because of Indiana's reputation for "Hoosier hospitality". Greg Ballard, the Republican mayor of Indianapolis, called on the legislature to repeal the law, or add explicit protections for sexual orientation and gender identity. Mike Pence and Republican leadership in Indiana have defended the bill, stating it is not about discrimination.

== Background ==
Indiana's Attorney General Greg Zoeller has written amicus briefs supporting same-sex marriage bans in Hollingsworth v. Perry and United States v. Windsor and appealed the Supreme Court's ruling on same-sex marriage in Indiana. Politifact reports that "Conservatives in Indiana and elsewhere see the Religious Freedom Restoration Act as a vehicle for fighting back against the legalization of same-sex marriage." In 2015, the Alabama Supreme Court ordered a halt to the issuing of same-sex marriage licenses, Kansas rescinded an LGBT anti-discrimination order, and Arkansas prohibited anti-discrimination codes being enacted by cities and local governments.

Indiana, unlike neighboring Illinois, does not have a state-wide anti-discrimination ordinance, and the majority of the state does not have local ordinances against discrimination against LGBT people. When a reporter asked Speaker of the House Brian Bosma whether it would be against the law for a business to put up a "no gays allowed" sign, he stated that "it would depend" on whether the business was in "a community that had a human rights ordinance."

In 2000, Pence stated "Congress should oppose any effort to recognize homosexual's [sic] as a 'discreet [sic] and insular minority' entitled to the protection of anti-discrimination laws similar to those extended to women and ethnic minorities." He called for "an audit to ensure that federal dollars were no longer being given to organizations that celebrate and encourage the types of behaviors that facilitate the spreading of the HIV virus". He commented that homosexuals should not serve in the military, stating "Homosexuality is incompatible with military service because the presence of homosexuals in the ranks weakens unit cohesion" and in 2010 stated that repealing Don't ask, don't tell would "have an impact on unit cohesion." Pence opposed the 2009 Matthew Shepard Hate Crimes Act stating that Obama would "advance a radical social agenda" and said that pastors "could be charged or be subject to intimidation for simply expressing a Biblical worldview on the issue of homosexual behavior."

=== Burwell v. Hobby Lobby ===
20 States have existing RFRA Laws Sixteen states have proposed legislation in 2015 Some states have RFRA laws and LGBT anti-discrimination ordinances

In 1993, the Religious Freedom Restoration Act was passed by the U.S. Congress and signed into law by President Bill Clinton. Originally, the federal law was intended to apply to federal, state, and local governments. In 1997, the U.S. Supreme Court in City of Boerne v. Flores held that the Religious Freedom Restoration Act only applies to the federal government, but not states and other local municipalities within them. As a result, 21 states passed state RFRAs before 2014.

In 2014, the United States Supreme Court handed down a landmark decision in Burwell v. Hobby Lobby Stores, Inc. recognizing a for-profit corporation's claim of religious belief. Nineteen members of Congress who signed the original RFRA stated in a submission to the Supreme Court that they "could not have anticipated, and did not intend, such a broad and unprecedented expansion of RFRA". The members further stated that RFRA "extended free-exercise rights only to individuals and to religious, non-profit organizations. No Supreme Court precedent had extended free-exercise rights to secular, for-profit corporations." Following this decision, many states have proposed expanding state RFRA laws to include for-profit corporations, including in Arizona where SB 1062 was passed but was vetoed by Governor Jan Brewer in 2014.

== Content and other related aspects ==
=== Content ===
As signed into law, Indiana SB 101 stipulates that "a governmental entity may not substantially burden a person's exercise of religion... [unless it] (1) is in furtherance of a compelling governmental interest; and (2) is the least restrictive means of furthering that compelling governmental interest." The bill defines a "person" to include any individual, organization, or "a partnership, a limited liability company, a corporation, a company, a firm, a society, a joint-stock company, an unincorporated association", or another entity driven by religious belief that can sue and be sued, "regardless of whether the entity is organized and operated for profit or nonprofit purposes." A "person," as defined by the bill, would be permitted to cite violation of this law as a defense in legal proceedings. While the bill explicitly states that no government entity need be involved in the legal proceeding to invoke such a defense, it also states that "the governmental entity has an unconditional right to intervene in order to respond to the person's invocation of this chapter."

=== Signing ===
The bill was approved by a vote of 40–10. The Governor signed the approved bill into law three days later, and the law became effective on July 1, 2015.

Lobbyists from the American Family Association and the Indiana Family Institute, who pushed for a ban on same-sex marriage in Indiana, were among the guests invited to the bill's private signing. Micah Clark, executive director of the American Family Association of Indiana, previously stated that the organization would shift its focus from opposing gay marriages to preventing people from being forced to participate if they oppose them on religious grounds. Conservative Christian lobby group Advance America, which warned of "dire consequences" if same-sex marriage was enacted, stated on their website that the law means "Christian bakers, florists and photographers should not be punished for refusing to participate in a homosexual marriage!"

Governor Mike Pence has repeatedly stated the bill does not cause discrimination, stating in a release that the bill is about "respecting and reassuring" citizens that their "religious freedoms are intact."

=== Differences to the Religious Freedom Restoration Act other State Religious Freedom Restoration Acts ===
The bill differs in two ways from the federal Religious Freedom Restoration Act (RFRA) and other State Religious Freedom Restoration Acts. First: Religious protection is provided to more businesses than under the federal statute, because the federal statute and its state counterparts except that of South Carolina have no language granting any for-profit business the right to “the free exercise of religion”. Louisiana and Pennsylvania explicitly exclude for-profit businesses from the protection of their RFRAs. Second: A defense in actions between private parties is explicitly provided for a wide range of suits including discrimination suits. This due the following language in the statute: “A person whose exercise of religion has been substantially burdened, or is likely to be substantially burdened, by a violation of this chapter may assert the violation or impending violation as a claim or defense in a judicial or administrative proceeding, regardless of whether the state or any other governmental entity is a party to the proceeding." (Emphasis added in source) This language isn't in other state Religious Freedom Restoration Acts except that from Texas. According to Law professor Garrett Epps this means "first, that the Indiana statute explicitly recognizes that a for-profit corporation has “free exercise” rights matching those of individuals or churches." It also means secondly that a business’s “free exercise” right is not simply a defense against actions brought by government, but more importantly a defense against a private lawsuit by another person. Taken together, these two differences reveal that, contrary to the federal RFRA and its state counterparts, Indiana Senate Bill 101 was "carefully written to make clear that 1) businesses can use it against 2) civil-rights suits brought by individuals."

== Impact and reaction ==
Indiana passed its bill in a "perfect storm" of media attention, when 1,500 credentialed media were coming to town for the Men's Final Four, said Chris Gahl, vice president of Visit Indy, the city's tourism marketing agency. After the bill's signing, a restaurant owner, named Ryan, called Indianapolis radio to say that his Christian belief in "Adam and Eve not Adam and Steve" means he should be able to turn away same-sex couples.

Within a week of the bill being signed into law, Memories Pizza, a family-owned business in Walkerton, became the first business to publicly announce that they would refuse to cater a same-sex wedding as a result of the law. The owners stated that "if a gay couple or a couple belonging to another religion came in to the restaurant to eat, they would never deny them service... they just don't agree with gay marriages". The announcement immediately triggered a heated backlash against Memories Pizza; Yelp users took to the platform to condemn the pizzeria and its owners, resulting in a review average of one out of five stars. Following the negativity, the business temporarily closed due to fake orders and threats it received. Due to this, supporters of the restaurant raised over $800,000 for it. Indiana Pastors Alliance Executive Director Rob Johnson Jr. said of the public and media's response to the bill, "This is a false narrative created by the left to say that we are somehow evil people by embracing biblical beliefs." Memories Pizza closed permanently in April 2018.

The Republican mayor of Indianapolis, Greg Ballard, issued a statement against the bill: "I had hoped the State house wouldn't move in this direction on RFRA, but it seems as if the bill was a fait accompli from the beginning. I don't believe this legislation truly represents our state or our capital city. Indianapolis strives to be a welcoming place that attracts businesses, conventions, visitors, and residents. We are a diverse city, and I want everyone who visits and lives in Indy to feel comfortable here. RFRA sends the wrong signal." Ballard called on the legislature to repeal the law, or add explicit protections for sexual orientation and gender identity, and has called for local human rights ordinances to be exempt from the statute. Ballard, along with four other living mayors of Indianapolis Richard Lugar, William H. Hudnut III, Stephen Goldsmith, and Bart Peterson stated that they are "distressed and very concerned" at the fallout of the bill. They were joined in their request for an amendment of the bill to safeguard individual's civil rights by Republican mayor of Evansville, Lloyd Winnecke, who released a statement warning that "this new law sends... a message that contradicts what I know to be true about the citizens of Evansville... We must continue to be a community of hospitality, warmth, and with a desire to treat everyone with respect.".

Mitch Daniels, the former Governor of Indiana and president of Purdue University, stated that the university is opposed to any governmental measure that interferes with their anti-discrimination policy. James Danko, the president of Butler University, called the bill "ill-conceived legislation at best" and commented, "No matter your opinion of the law, it is hard to argue with the fact it has done significant damage to our state." Michael McRobbie, president of Indiana University, called on the government to "reconsider this unnecessary legislation" and stated, "the damage already done to Indiana's reputation is such that all public officials and public institutions in our state need to reaffirm our absolute commitment to the Hoosier values of fair treatment and non-discrimination." Charles L. Venable, CEO of the Indianapolis Museum of Art, stated that the bill will "make it harder for us to attract the best and the brightest to the state."

Nine CEOs from Angie's List, Salesforce Marketing Cloud, Anthem Inc., Eli Lilly and Company, Cummins, Emmis Communications, Roche Diagnostics, Indiana University Health, and Dow AgroSciences called on the Republican leadership to enact legislation to prevent "discrimination based upon sexual orientation or gender identity."

Tim Cook, CEO of Apple Inc., stated that he was "deeply disappointed" in the law. PayPal co-founder Max Levchin told CNN that opposing the law is "a basic human decency issue," and stated, "I'm asking my fellow CEOs to look at how they're thinking about their relationship with the state and evaluate it in terms of the legislation that's getting signed into law." Yelp CEO Jeremy Stoppelman stated, "[It] is unconscionable to imagine that Yelp would create, maintain, or expand a significant business presence in any state that encouraged discrimination by businesses against our employees, or consumers at large." He stated, "These laws set a terrible precedent that will likely harm the broader economic health of the states where they have been adopted, the businesses currently operating in those states and, most importantly, the consumers who could be victimized under these laws." Eli Lilly and Company stated that the "outcome on this particular piece of legislation has been disappointing." Warren Buffett stated that if the law "could in any way be prejudicial to gays or lesbians, I'd be opposed to that".

The National Basketball Association (NBA), the Women's National Basketball Association (WNBA), the Indiana Pacers, and the Indiana Fever collectively put out a joint statement that read: "We will continue to ensure that all fans, players, and employees feel welcome at all NBA and WNBA events in Indiana and elsewhere." USA Track & Field stated they are "deeply concerned" by the bill. Mark Emmert, president of the National Collegiate Athletic Association (NCAA), issued a statement that expressed concern at how student-athletes, employees, and visitors would be treated and stated they "intend to closely examine the implications of this bill and how it might affect future events as well as our workforce." Bo Ryan, John Calipari, Tom Izzo, and Mike Krzyzewski released a statement though the National Association of Basketball Coaches ahead of a Final Four match in Indiana that "discrimination of any kind should not be tolerated". ESPN's Keith Olbermann called on the National Football League (NFL) and the NCAA to drop Indiana as a venue for major events. Charles Barkley described the bill as "unacceptable", and Jason Collins and Chris Kluwe oppose the bill. Arn Tellem stated that the bill "codifies hatred under the smoke screen of freedom and jeopardizes all that has been recently accomplished" and called for sports organizers to re-evaluate their short- and long-term plans in the state." NASCAR stated "We will not embrace nor participate in exclusion or intolerance."

Gen Con has issued a statement that it will leave the state if the bill is passed.

Eskenazi Health expressed concern that the legislation could lead to some patients being turned away from healthcare workers claiming religious objections, which would "undermine our patients' trust in every member of Eskenazi Health's staff and our health system in general."

On March 31, 2015, the Indianapolis Star published a front-page editorial titled "Fix This Now", which called for an offsetting law prohibiting discrimination based on gender or sexual orientation.

The Islamic Society of North America expressed concern at the potential for the law to create employment discrimination against Muslims. In a media release, ISNA stated that they welcome laws to protect an individual's right to free exercise of religion, but expressed "serious concerns about the extension of those rights to corporations as well as the protections against civil liability for discrimination by protected corporations against individuals." They stated that "If a corporation refused to hire a person because they were a Muslim and their religious beliefs did not permit them to hire Muslims", then lawsuits alleging discrimination could not succeed because the law is a defense to liability." The Sikh Coalition, the Central Conference of American Rabbis, the Religious Action Center of Reform Judaism, and the Disciples of Christ expressed concern about discrimination against religious and sexual minorities.

Possible Republican presidential candidates Jeb Bush, Marco Rubio, Bobby Jindal, Rick Santorum, Ted Cruz, and Ben Carson have all defended the law.

Bryan Fischer, the former Director of Issues Analysis for the American Family Association and a supporter of the law, likened opponents of the law to Hitler. Micah Clark from the evangelical lobby group American Family Association stated that adding anti-discrimination language "could totally destroy this bill."

Former Republican governor of California Arnold Schwarzenegger expressed his opposition to the bill saying, "Distracting, divisive laws like the one Indiana passed aren't just bad for the country, they're also bad for our party."

Jane Henegar, executive director of the American Civil Liberties Union of Indiana, stated that she was opposed to the bill. She claimed that SB 101 was too vague and could hurt the image of Indiana by perpetuating the idea that the people of Indiana could and would discriminate gender and sexual identities by masking them with religious beliefs. She makes a plea to the state that they should overturn the bill and listen to the many employers and activists that are against what the bill could do. In her statement, she also disregards the comparison of the RFRA of 1993 and SB 101.

In response to the bill, Indianapolis resident Bill Levin founded The First Church of Cannabis, arguing that the bill now protected one's right to use cannabis for religious reasons. The church planned to test out the bill in full on July 1, 2015, by using cannabis during the service, but legal threats from the city forced the first service to be without cannabis. Several days later, the church filed a lawsuit against the city of Indianapolis and the state of Indiana, claiming discrimination under the law.

On April 4, 2024, an Indiana appellate court ruled in favor of a group of plaintiffs who challenged the state's abortion ban on the grounds that it violated their religious beliefs under the state's Religious Freedom Restoration Act. On December 10, 2024, the Indiana Supreme Court denied a petition to transfer the case from the appeals court and sent the case back to the trial judge to decide the case on the merits. On March 5, 2026, a Marion County Superior Court judge granted a permanent injunction preventing Indiana from enforcing its near-total abortion ban against women whose religious beliefs necessitate the procedure.

=== Boycotts ===
George Takei, actor and LGBTQ rights activist, called the bill "bigotry, cloaked as religious protection" and called for a boycott of the state via his Facebook page and Twitter feed after the bill's signing on March 25, 2015, using the popular hashtag #boycottindiana. In an article on MSNBC, he recalls a similar bill in Arizona that was vetoed by Gov. Jan Brewer and states, "The days are over where some may be denied a seat at the table simply because of who they are – or in this case, whom they love."

Marc Benioff, CEO of Salesforce.com, described the bill as an "outrage" and announced that the company would cancel all programs that require customers or employees to travel to Indiana.

Angie's List announced that they would cancel a $40 million expansion of their Indianapolis-based headquarters due to concerns over the law, that would have moved 1000 jobs into the state.

The Disciples of Christ have threatened to move their annual conference out of Indiana over the bill.

The American Federation of State, County and Municipal Employees announced that they would pull their October conference out of Indianapolis.

The band Wilco cancelled a concert at the Old National Centre, and Nick Offerman and Megan Mullally cancelled a tour stop in Indiana.

The mayors of San Francisco, Portland, Washington, D.C., Oakland, and Seattle had all temporarily banned city-funded travel to Indiana.

The governors of Connecticut, Washington, Vermont, and New York State had all temporarily banned state-funded travel to Indiana.

=== Rescinded boycotts ===
The governor of Washington (Democrat) rescinded the state-funded travel ban on April 3, 2015. The governors of both New York State and Connecticut (all Democrats) lifted the state-funded travel ban on April 5, 2015. The mayors of New York City, San Francisco, Seattle, Portland, and Oakland (all Democrats) lifted their city-funded travel ban on April 7, 2015.

== Further legislation ==
A bill intended to provide protections for LGBT customers, employees, and tenants was proposed by Senate President David C. Long and House Speaker Brian Bosma on April 2, 2015, and was subsequently passed by the legislature and signed by Governor Pence. Indiana Senate Bill 50 of 2015 was this follow up legislation specifying that Indiana Senate Bill 101 does not authorize discrimination and became effective July 1, 2015. This follow legislation amended Indiana Senate Bill 101 in several ways:

- Section 1 of Indiana Senate Bill 50 stated that Indiana's Religious Freedom Restoration Act (RFRA) is not an authorization for a “provider” to refuse to offer or provide services, facilities, use of public accommodations, goods, employment, or housing to an individual on the bases of certain characteristics, including, but not limited to, sex, sexual orientation or gender identity. This section also stated that Indiana's RFRA is not a defense in a civil action or criminal prosecution for such refusal by a “provider” on the basis of certain characteristics, including, but not limited to, sexual orientation and gender identity.
- Indiana Senate Bill 50 Section 1 also specified that the Religious Freedom Restoration Act isn't denying any rights available under the Indiana Constitution.
- Section 2 of Indiana Senate Bill 50 defines “provider” as 1 or more individuals, partnerships, associations, organizations, limited liability companies, corporations, and other organized groups of individuals. It also exempts a nonprofit religious organization, or a designee thereof engaged in a religious or affiliated educational function of the organization.

The Indiana Chamber of Commerce, Indiana University, the NCAA, and Eli Lilly and Co expressed a positive reaction to the changes made by Indiana Senate Bill 50 of 2015. Greg Ballard endorsed the changes, and suggested on CNN that Christian lobby groups like Advance America and the American Family Association are "on the wrong side of history in this."

Bill Oesterle, the CEO of Angie's List, stated that he wanted the state to implement a stronger, statewide, non-discrimination ordinance, calling the changes "insufficient".

Christian Right lobbyists, who fought for the bill after the legalization of same-sex marriage, said that the changes "destroy" the bill by preventing Christian bakers and florists from refusing service to same-sex weddings.

== Similar bills in other states ==
A study by the Associated Press and GfK of 1,077 Americans in April 2015 found that 56% said that religious liberties were more important for the government to protect than the rights of gays and lesbians, but only 40% thought most business owners should be allowed to refuse service to gays and lesbians on religious grounds. 60 percent of Southerners, but only 45 percent of Northeasterners or Westerners, said wedding-related businesses should be allowed to refuse service to gay couples.

A similar bill in Georgia stalled in Spring 2015, with constituents expressing concern to Georgia lawmakers about the financial impacts of such a bill. Supporters of the bill stated that the bill would be "gutted" by the inclusion of anti-discrimination clause. The convention industry in Georgia said that a $15 million business could be at risk of boycotts.

After the Burwell v. Hobby Lobby Stores, Inc. decision, the definition of religious beliefs expanded from the beliefs of individual employees to the practices of closely held for-profit corporations. Georgia State Rep. Stacey Evans, D-Smryna, proposed an amendment to change references of "persons" to "individuals," which would have eliminated corporations from the protection of the bill. State Rep. Barry Fleming, R-Harlem, noted that such a move would negate the "closely held corporation" protection granted last year by the U.S. Supreme Court in the Hobby Lobby case. The amendment was rejected.

On March 28, 2015, the Arkansas Senate passed a bill (the "Conscience Protection Act"), modeled after Indiana's RFRA. Hundreds of protesters rallied at Arkansas's Capitol to oppose the bill.

In Spring 2015, Texas SJR 10 and HJR 55 planned to introduce a similar bill that changes the language from "substantially burden" to "burden". The Texas Business Association voted to oppose the bills. The business association argued that the state would lose events like Super Bowl LI which will be held in Houston in 2017. Molly White introduced a bill that would expressly grant private businesses the right to "refuse to provide goods or services to any person based on a sincerely held religious belief or on conscientious grounds." The bill was introduced following oral arguments during Obergefell v. Hodges.

A similar bill in North Carolina also stalled in Spring 2015. Commentators predicted a backlash similar to Indiana's.

== See also ==
- Arizona SB 1062
- Civil Rights Act of 1964
- Fix This Now
- Freedom of religion in the United States
- Houston, Texas Proposition 1, 2015
- Kansas House Bill 2453
- Open for Service
- Public Facilities Privacy and Security Act
- United States Religious Freedom Restoration Act
- State Religious Freedom Restoration Acts
