= Fix This Now =

2015 newspaper headline

- Editor: Jeff Taylor
- Language: English
- Genre: Staff Editorial
- Published in: The Indianapolis Star
- Publication date: March 31, 2015
- Publication place: Indianapolis, Indiana
- Media type: Newspaper
- Website: https://www.indystar.com/story/opinion/2015/03/30/editorial-gov-pence-fix-religious-freedom-law-now/70698802/

Front page of the Indianapolis Star, March 31, 2015

"Fix This Now" was the front-page headline for The Indianapolis Star on March 31, 2015, referencing the newly passed "Religious Freedom" law that many said could allow businesses to deny serving LGBT couples on the basis of religious obligations.

== Background ==
"Fix This Now" was the headline on the front page of Indiana's dominant newspaper, the Indianapolis Star, on March 31, 2015. Almost the entire front page of the newspaper was taken by the headline, set in large white letters on a black background.

It is unusual for a 20th- or 21st-century mass-market American newspaper to dedicate its entire front page to an editorial or for a non-tabloid to set any headline in such large type. Many publications commented on the headline on the day of its appearance. The Washington Post called the move "extraordinary", the New York Daily News called it "rare". Other major publications such as Time also took immediate notice of the Star's editorial, and news of and commentary on the event was quickly and widely tweeted and circulated on social media.

The editorial was occasioned by Indiana's newly passed Religious Freedom Restoration Act (RFRA). Unlike many State Religious Freedom Restoration Acts, Indiana's did not (at that time) prohibit its use to discriminate against LGBT people and allowed private entities to cite the law as a defense in a civil suit. The editorial called on the legislature and Indiana governor Mike Pence to pass another law ensuring that the law cannot be used as an excuse to discriminate against gay people:

We are at a critical moment in Indiana's history. And much is at stake... Half steps will not undo the damage... Gov. Mike Pence and the General Assembly need to enact a state law to prohibit discrimination in employment, housing, education and public accommodations on the basis of a person's sexual orientation or gender identity. Those protections and RFRA can co-exist. They do elsewhere... Governor, Indiana is in a state of crisis. It is worse than you seem to understand. You must act with courage and wisdom. You must lead us forward now. You must ensure that all Hoosiers have strong protections against discrimination.

— Indianapolis Star (Jeff Taylor, editor), "Gov. Pence, fix 'religious freedom' law now", Indianapolis Star

The editorial, which also promoted the hashtag #WeAreIndiana with the assertion that "Indiana embraces everyone and we do not discriminate", was published in the context of a larger general backlash against the Indiana law.
