= Arizona SB 1062 =

Proposed law

Arizona SB 1062 was an Arizona bill to amend an existing law to give any individual or legal entity an exemption from any state law if it substantially burdened their exercise of religion, including Arizona law requiring public accommodation.

It was one of several similar bills in U.S. state legislatures allowing individuals to refuse service based on religion, with some bills specifically protecting religious disapproval of same-sex marriage. It was widely reported as targeting LGBT people, although Arizona law at the time provided no protection against discrimination on the basis of sexual orientation. Critics noted that it would have broadly denied anyone service on religious grounds. Supporters argued that it was simply restoring the legal status of the right to free exercise of religion as intended by the First Amendment to the United States Constitution.

The bill was passed by the Republican-controlled state legislature and vetoed by Republican Governor Jan Brewer on February 26, 2014.

The national controversy surrounding the bill prompted Arizona State Senator Steve Gallardo to publicly come out as gay. He referred to the bill as a "game changer," and noted the national controversy surrounding its passage, as prompting his decision.

== Background ==
The United States Supreme Court ruled in Employment Division v. Smith (1990) that a person may not defy neutral laws of general applicability, such as public accommodation laws, as an expression of religious belief. "To permit this," wrote Justice Scalia, "would make the professed doctrines of religious belief superior to the law of the land, and in effect to permit every citizen to become a law unto himself." He wrote that neutral laws of general applicability do not have to meet the standard of strict scrutiny, because such a requirement would create "a private right to ignore generally applicable laws". Strict scrutiny would require a law to be the least restrictive means of furthering a compelling government interest. The meaning of neutral law of general applicability was elaborated by the court in 1993. The US Congress responded by passing the Religious Freedom Restoration Act (RFRA), requiring strict scrutiny when a neutral law of general applicability "substantially burden[s] a person's exercise of religion". When the Supreme Court ruled in 1997 that the RFRA was inapplicable to state laws, some states passed their own Religious Freedom Restoration Acts, including the Arizona law that SB 1062 proposed to amend. The Supreme Court upheld the constitutionality of the federal RFRA as applied to federal statutes in Gonzales v. O Centro Espirita Beneficente Uniao do Vegetal in 2006.

Arizona lawmakers were concerned about a 2013 New Mexico Supreme Court ruling that weakened its state's RFRA, which was passed as a religious exemption to its own public accommodation law prohibiting the denial of services based on a person's sexual orientation or gender identity. Twenty-one states, not including Arizona, have similar public accommodation laws protecting sexual orientation. The New Mexico Supreme Court ruled in Elane Photography v. Willock that the state's RFRA could not be invoked between two parties if the government was not a party to the legal proceedings.

The bill was introduced by Senator Steve Yarbrough to amend a law currently giving religious assemblies or institutions a religious exemption from any law. The bill was passed by the Republican-controlled Senate on February 19, along party lines and passed by the state House on February 20. The vote tally in the Senate was 17 for, 13 against, and in the House, 33 for, 27 against. On February 26, Governor Jan Brewer vetoed the bill after significant national attention. There are not enough votes in the legislature to override the veto.

Following the veto, Senator Steve Gallardo, one of the bill's most strident opponents, came out as gay. He identified the day that the bill passed the Senate as a "game changer".

== Content ==
SB 1062 was intended to amend Section 41-1493 of the Arizona Revised Statutes, which prevents "any law, including state and local laws, ordinances, rules, regulations and policies" from "substantially burden[ing]" a person's exercise of religion, unless the burden is the least restrictive means of furthering a "compelling government interest". SB 1062 would have revised it by expanding the definition of person in the article from "a religious assembly or institution" to also include "any individual, association, partnership, corporation, church," "estate, trust, foundation or other legal entity", and would have allowed for religious-freedom as a claim or defense in lawsuits "regardless of whether the government is a party to the proceeding."

== Criticism ==
While proponents said the bill was intended to protect the right of business owners to refuse services based on religious objections and was a direct response to the New Mexico Supreme Court's ruling in Elane Photography v. Willock against a business that religiously objected to accommodating a same-sex wedding, critics, a few media outlets, and opponents argued that the intent was to allow businesses to refuse to serve the LGBT community, specifically in the cases of same-sex couples. Critics said that the bill would have allowed any business to discriminate against any group of people for any religious reason.

Businesses, civil rights groups, and gay rights groups had opposed the bill. As state law already allows businesses to refuse services to anyone for any given reason, business owners noted that refusing services to LGBT people was currently allowed anyway. They would only be losing business by discriminating and do not need extra protections for something they cannot be sued for. Erwin Chemerinsky, dean of the UC Irvine law school, argued that the bill was harmful and "sends a message that the state is bigoted." Supporters of the bill included two conservative groups, the Center for Arizona Policy and the Alliance Defending Freedom, both of whom worked on the bill. The Arizona Catholic Conference had called on its congregants to support the bill. Three lawmakers who initially voted for the bill, including Senate Majority Whip Adam Driggs, had encouraged Governor Brewer to veto it.

The National Football League stated that it was "following the issue in Arizona and will continue to do so should the bill be signed into law", prompting concerns from Arizona business leaders that signing of SB1062 would lead to the pulling of Super Bowl XLIX, similar to how Super Bowl XXVII was moved to Pasadena, California after a Martin Luther King Jr. Day ballot measure failed in Arizona's 1990 elections. The issue was rendered moot by the vetoing of the bill.

== Similar legislation in other states ==
Arizona SB 1062 was similar, at the time, to bills in five other states—South Dakota, Kansas, Idaho, Tennessee, Colorado, and Maine—that all failed or faced major setbacks as of February 2014. Other bills centered on the same core issues are:

- Arkansas
  - The Legislature passed the Conscience Protection Act is quoted as: "designed to make sure governments cannot burden the free exercise of religion."
  - Governor signed and in effect since July 1, 2015.
- Colorado
  - Bill "designed to make sure governments cannot burden the free exercise of religion."
  - Rejected along party lines in February 2013.
- Georgia
  - Bill would affirm the "right to act or refuse to act in a manner substantially motivated by a sincerely held religious tenet or belief whether or not the exercise is compulsory or a central part or requirement of the person's religious tenets or beliefs."
  - House version withdrawn on February 27. The Senate version has not been placed on that chamber's calendar.
- Hawaii
  - Bill states "that government should not substantially burden religious exercise without compelling justification."
  - Rejected by House Judiciary Committee on February 15.
- Indiana
  - Indiana SB 101 states "that government should not substantially burden religious exercise without compelling justification."
  - Approved by House and Senate on March 25. The Governor signed the approved bill into law two days later and the law has been in effect since July 1, 2015.
- Idaho
  - Bill would have allowed individuals to deny service to gays and lesbians.
  - Withdrawn on February 19.
- Kansas
  - Bill states "no individual, religious entity or government official had to provide any service if it would be contrary to the sincerely held religious beliefs of the individual or religious entity regarding sex or gender."
  - Passed the House on February 12. Senate leaders refused to take up the bill.
- Maine
  - Bill states "the government could not infringe upon a person's religious freedom except in cases of 'compelling state interest."
  - Rejected by Senate on February 18 and by House on February 20.
- Mississippi
  - Bill says state and local governments cannot put a substantial burden on religious practices.
  - Approved by House and Senate on April 1. The Governor signed the approved bill into law three days later and the law became effective on July 1, 2014.
- Missouri
  - Bill would allow individuals to deny service to gays and lesbians.
  - No action on bill as of March 1.
- Nevada
  - Bill "designed to make sure governments cannot burden the free exercise of religion."
  - Passed by Senate on Apr 22, 2013. House refused to take it up.
- North Carolina
  - Bill would prohibit the state or any of its agencies and local governments from "substantially burdening a person's free exercise of religion."
  - No action on bill as of March 1.
- North Dakota
  - June 2012 ballot initiative to amend the North Dakota Constitution would preventing the government from burdening the sincere exercise of religious liberty by a person or religious organization, absent proof of a compelling governmental interest, and then only by use of the least restrictive mean.
  - Ballot initiative failed in statewide primary election on June 12, 2012–60,465 voting for, 107,680 voting against (36.0%-64.0%).
- Oklahoma
  - Bill would have allowed individuals to deny service to gays and lesbians.
  - Being rewritten, no action likely this legislative session.
- Ohio
  - Bill would have allowed individuals to deny service to gays and lesbians.
  - Withdrawn on February 25.
- Oregon
  - Ballot initiative "intended to exempt a person from supporting same-sex ceremonies in violation of deeply held religious beliefs."
  - Not approved for ballot as of March 1.
- South Dakota
  - Bill meant to "protect the citizens and businesses of South Dakota regarding speech pertaining to views on sexual orientation and to provide for the defense of such citizens and businesses."
  - Rejected by Senate Judiciary Committee on February 18.
- Tennessee
  - Legislature passed the Kentucky Religious Freedom Restoration Act, which quotes; "Government shall not substantially burden a person's freedom of religion. The right to act or refuse to act in a manner motivated by a sincerely held religious belief may not be substantially burdened unless the government proves by clear and convincing evidence that it has a compelling governmental interest in infringing the specific act or refusal to act and has used the least restrictive means to further that interest. A "burden" shall include indirect burdens such as withholding benefits, assessing penalties, or an exclusion of programs or access to facilities."
  - Governor signed, went into effect July 1, 2014.
- Utah
  - Bill would have allowed individuals to deny service to gays and lesbians.
  - Legislature refused to take up bill in wake of state's gay marriage fight.
- West Virginia
  - Bill would require the government to show compelling interest if it chooses to enforce a law that substantially burdens one's religious beliefs.
  - No action on bill as of March 13.

== See also ==
- Indiana SB 101
- Freedom of religion in the United States
- Kansas House Bill 2453
- LGBT rights in Arizona
