= State Marriage Defense Act =

The State Marriage Defense Act (H.R. 3829, S. 2024 in the 113th Congress, H.R. 824, S. 435 in the 114th Congress) was a proposed law introduced by Republican Senators Ted Cruz of Texas and Mike Lee of Utah. The legislation would have defined the terms "spouse" and "marriage" when used in federal laws to always follow the definition used in the particular state where the law is applied. The bill was advocated for by conservative and Christian right organizations after United States v. Windsor, a Supreme Court case which struck down the federal ban on same-sex marriage ensured by the Defense of Marriage Act.

== History ==
The legislation had 28 co-sponsors when it was introduced.

In the wake of the Supreme Court United States v. Windsor decision, federal agencies such as the IRS use a "state of celebration" rule rather than a "state of domicile" rule to determine if a marriage is recognized. In response, the State Marriage Defense Act was introduced to the United States Senate on October 8, 2014, by Republican Senators Ted Cruz of Texas and Mike Lee of Utah.

The Act would, for federal purposes, prohibit the term "marriage" from referring to any relationship that an individual's state of residence does not recognize, and prohibits the term "spouse" from including anyone whose marriage is not recognized by their state of residence.

== Reactions ==
=== Support ===
Organizations that expressed support were the National Organization for Marriage, the Ethics & Religious Liberty Commission, Concerned Women for America, the Family Research Council, and Heritage Action.

Supporters of the proposed legislation take a states' rights approach. One fellow of the Family Research Council offered the example of a same-sex couple married in Massachusetts who live in South Carolina, which does not recognize their marriage: "When a federal agency such as the Internal Revenue Service begins treating that South Carolina couple as if they are married, the law of South Carolina is undermined, and the right of the people of South Carolina to pass marriage laws in their state is usurped." The Council's President Tony Perkins said the Act "serves to protect state definitions of marriage against what the [Supreme] Court called efforts 'to put a thumb on the scales and influence a state's decision as to how to shape its own marriage laws'", quoting Windsor.

Salvatore Cordileone, Roman Catholic Archbishop of San Francisco and chairman of the U.S. Conference of Catholic Bishops' Subcommittee for the Promotion and Defense of Marriage, endorsed the legislation on January 10. He objected to the Obama administration's decision to recognize a marriage based on its "place of celebration"—whether the marriage was valid at the time and place it was solemnized—without respect to state laws in effect where a married same-sex couples lives, a "place of domicile" rule. He wrote that "The Supreme Court's decision last year in U.S. v. Windsor ... requires the federal government to defer to state marriage law, not disregard it".

Gerard Bradley, Professor of Law at Notre Dame Law School, wrote that Windsor left government officials at different levels with "an acute choice-of-law question. Do the laws of the state of domicile or celebration prevail?" He criticized the Obama administration for allowing federal agencies like the Departments of State and Education to choose the "place of celebration" rule when federal statutes do not specify how to determine the validity of a marriage even though "[t]hese agencies have no inherent legal authority to define marriage." He contended that a state's control of the definition of marriage "within its borders, for the common good" was fundamental to its sovereignty, while the "extent to which any state's marriages travel to other states is a comparatively minor matter."

=== Against ===
Detractors contend that this proposed new federal statute would violate the Equal Protection provisions in the Fifth and Fourteenth Amendment to the United States Constitution. These Equal Protection provisions forbid any law that would treat any recognized class or classes of persons differently from any other persons. Indeed, the United States Supreme Court, in its 2013 decision in the Windsor case, struck parts of the Defense of Marriage Act as unconstitutional on these exact grounds. Because the entire point of this proposed State Marriage Defense Act would be to treat homosexuals differently from all other persons, it would violate the Equal Protection provisions of the 5th and 14th Amendments. Thus, critics say the only way to bypass the Supreme Court's constitutional interpretation would be to enact a new Amendment to the constitution which would modify its Equal Protection provisions so that homosexuals could be treated differently from all other persons. It is not realistic to imagine that such a new Amendment would be enacted.

== See also ==
- Obergefell v. Hodges
- Defense of Marriage Act
- Respect for Marriage Act
- Religious Freedom Restoration Act (Indiana)
- Religious Freedom Act (Kansas)
- Federal Marriage Amendment
