= Bruce Borders =

American politician from Indiana

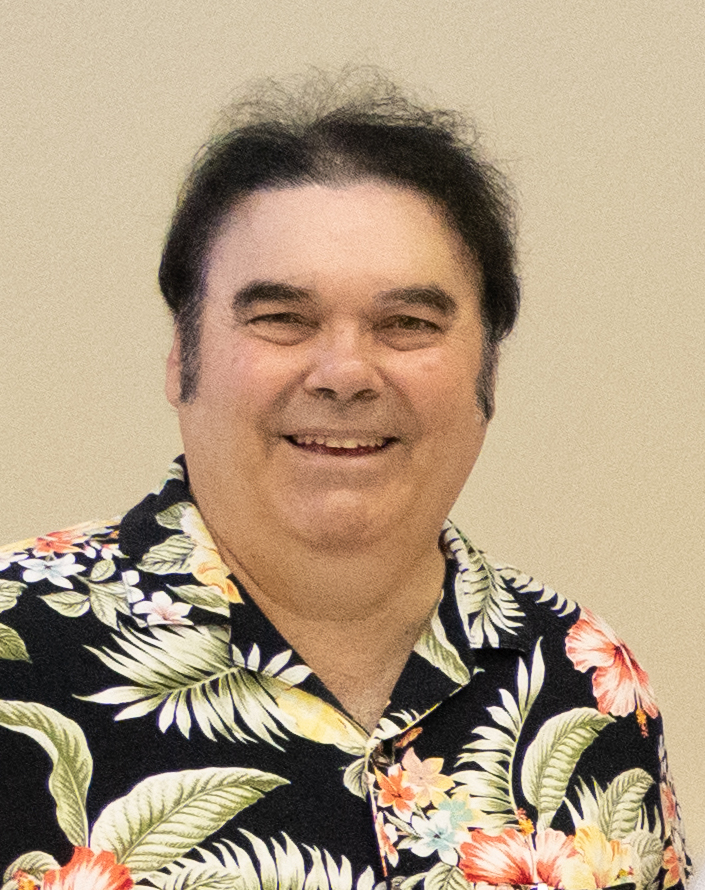

Member of the Indiana House of Representatives from the 45th district
- In office November 5, 2014 – November 3, 2026
- Preceded by: Bionca Gambill
- In office November 3, 2004 – November 7, 2012
- Preceded by: Allen Chowning
- Succeeded by: Kreg Battles

Mayor of Jasonville, Indiana
- In office 1987–1995
- Preceded by: Lawrence Howard
- Succeeded by: Jerry Haseman

Personal details
- Born: Bruce Alan Borders
- Party: Republican
- Spouse: Lola
- Children: 3
- Occupation: Politician, Elvis impersonator

Bruce Alan Borders is the current State Representative for the 45th District in the Indiana House of Representatives. He is also a former mayor of the town of Jasonville, Indiana. He is also an Elvis impersonator.

== Professional life ==
Borders was first elected to the Indiana House of Representatives in 2004. He represents House District 45, which includes portions of Greene, Daviess, Sullivan, Knox and Vigo counties.

He is a member of the Local Government Committee, Insurance Committee and the Commerce, Small Business and Economic Development Committee.

Borders was one of the Indiana Republicans who helped pass SB 101, or the Religious Freedom Restoration Act. The Indianapolis Star reported that "Rep. Bruce Borders, R-Jasonville, spoke about an anesthesiologist who didn't want to anesthetize a woman in preparation for an abortion. Borders said he believes the Bible's command to "do all things as unto the Lord" means religious believers need to be protected not just in church, but in their workplaces as well." The Christian Science Monitor reported: "“If we truly are doing things unto the Lord, our business can be ... a church or sanctuary,” argued Indiana Republican Rep. Bruce Borders on the House floor Monday, bringing up the question of the anesthesiologist. “People deserve protection in their businesses as well, not just on Sunday morning.”

One of the bills introduced by Borders for the Indiana 2017 session was HB 1361. The bill's wording in its entirety "Birth certificate information. Provides that, subject to certain exceptions, the gender listed on an individual's birth certificate and permanent record made from the birth certificate may not be changed." The bill seen as anti-transgender by LGBT advocacy groups. Freedom Indiana, an Indiana-based LGBT advocacy group, stated the bill denied "the very existence of transgender people, the identity they live as and the person they have always known themselves to be." Borders responded to the outcry stating "This was not a philosophically driven thing, I just respect accuracy in all legal records." As published by Greene County Daily, a news site in the county he resides, "Borders said the premise of the bill was based on information received from an individual who works with medical records. The person said transgender individuals are making changes to their birth certificates to convey the gender in which they live each day." In the same article Borders stated "In absence of an error, they (birth certificates) should stand as they are ... What we’ve got is perception overwriting the truth,". The bill was not advanced out of committee for the 2017 legislation.

Borders lost the May 5, 2026 Republican primary to Kellie Streeter, who won the November 3 general election.

== Political offices ==
- Indiana House of Representatives: 2004–2012, 2014–present
- Mayor of Jasonville, Indiana: 1987–1995

== Life as Elvis ==
Borders has been featured in television and print several times as Elvis. Among his appearances:

- David Letterman
- Oprah Winfrey
- USA Today
- Entertainment Tonight

== Education ==
Borders obtained a BBA in Business Management from Evangel College in Springfield, Missouri.
