= Project Blitz =

American Christian right coalition

Project Blitz is a coalition of over 40 Christian right groups, including the Congressional Prayer Caucus Foundation, the National Legal Foundation, and Wallbuilders Pro-Family Legislators Conference. Founded by Randy Forbes, the group states that it seeks to "protect the free exercise of traditional Judeo-Christian religious values and beliefs in the public square, and to reclaim and properly define the narrative which supports such beliefs." It is rooted in Christian nationalist ideology. Project Blitz also operates as "Freedom for All" and as part of the "First Freedom Coalition."

The group specifically lobbies lawmakers to enact legislation that permit expanded Christian practice in public institutions; supports conservative legislators at the local, state and federal level with public relations and messaging; and otherwise seeks to alter longstanding narratives of religious liberty issues. Its agenda includes the promotion of the Bible in public schools and the codification of "religious exemptions" regarding women's reproductive healthcare and LGBTQ civil-rights protections.

The Project's steering committee includes David Barton; Buddy Pilgrim, founder of Integrity Leadership; Bill Dallas, founder of United in Purpose; and Lea Carawan, co-founder and executive director of the Congressional Prayer Caucus Foundation (CPCF).

== Model legislation ==
The Project is best known for providing model legislation, proclamations, and talking points for state and local legislators who wish to introduce bills that support religious freedom and liberty, as defined by the Project. Through its Report and Analysis on Religious Freedom Measures Impacting Prayer and Faith in America, the project provides models and strategies for addressing a variety of its concerns, including definitions of gender and sexuality, biblical literacy in public schools, recognition of Christian heritage and Christmas Day, and displays of the national motto. It also provides talking points for opposing efforts that restrict conservative practices, including the prohibition of conversion therapy, and repeals of State Religious Freedom Restoration Acts. A previous version of the report was distributed to over 750 state legislators.

== Influence ==
As of December 2018, 25 bills based on the recommendations of the Project were introduced out of over 70 being considered. They passed in five states, including Alabama, Arizona, Florida, Louisiana, and Tennessee. These sorts of bills included measures that would, for example, allow adoption and foster care agencies to refuse services based on religious beliefs and mandate public schools to display "In God We Trust" signage. "Also popular were bills encouraging schools to teach the Bible and encouraging students and teachers to express religious beliefs in school – both of which can lead to proselytism or denigration of non-Christian faiths." Legislation drafted by Project Blitz to allow Bible classes in public schools was enacted in Kentucky in 2017, and at least ten state legislatures introduced versions of the same Project Blitz bill in 2019.

As of October 2019, CPCF leadership had claimed a network of 950 state legislators in 38 states.

== Criticism ==
The Project has been criticized by various secular organizations, including Americans United for Separation of Church and State and American Atheists for its alleged theocratic tendencies and dominionism, resulting in a distortion of the idea of religious freedom, promotion of discrimination, and its opposition to the separation of religion and government, among other concerns. The research upon which some of the Project's claims regarding sexuality are based has also been called into question for consisting of "poorly designed studies and discredited, outdated statistics", according to the American Humanist Association.

In 2019, a coalition of 43 religious and allied organizations, including the National Council of Churches, the Anti-Defamation League, the Hindu American Foundation, and the Center for Inquiry, issued a statement directed at state lawmakers opposing the Project and similar legislative efforts.

In October 2019, in the face of public criticism and counter campaigns, Project Blitz had been renamed "Freedom for All" and the Congressional Prayer Caucus Foundation web site no longer referenced "Project Blitz."

== See also ==
- American Legislative Exchange Council (ALEC)
- National Council on Bible Curriculum in Public Schools
- Regulatory capture
