= Kreg Battles =

American politician from Indiana

Member of the Indiana House of Representatives from the 45th district
- In office November 7, 2012 – May 6, 2014
- Preceded by: Bruce Borders
- Succeeded by: Bionca Gambil

Member of the Indiana House of Representatives from the 64th district
- In office November 8, 2006 – November 7, 2012
- Preceded by: Troy Woodruff
- Succeeded by: Thomas Washburne

Personal details
- Born: September 4, 1958 (age 68) Washington, Indiana
- Party: Democratic
- Spouse: Susan
- Education: Indiana State University
- Profession: Teacher

Kreg Battles is a Democratic member of the Indiana House of Representatives, representing the 64th District since 2006. In 2009, he was elected chairman of the House Committee on Elections and Apportionment Committee and Vice Chair of the House Standing Committee on Commerce, Energy, Technology, and Utilities. Due to redistricting, he was moved to the 45th district in 2012.

Battles has taught Math and Chemistry in the Vincennes Community Schools since 1983.
