= Arizona Christian University =

Private University in Glendale, Arizona

Coordinates: 33.622617°N 112.181550°W

- Former names: Southwestern Conservative Baptist Bible College (1960–); Southwestern College (1961–2011)
- Motto: Transforming Culture with Truth
- Type: Private university
- Established: 1960; 66 years ago
- Accreditation: HLC
- Religious affiliation: Non-denominational Christian
- Academic affiliations: Council for Christian Colleges and Universities, Association for Biblical Higher Education
- President: Len Munsil
- Faculty: 36 full-time
- Administrative staff: 125
- Students: 1,600
- Location: Glendale, Arizona, U.S.
- Campus: Suburban, 73 acres (30 ha)
- Colors: Red & Yellow
- Nickname: Firestorm
- Sporting affiliations: NAIA – GSAC; NAIA – Frontier (football); NAIA – CCC (wrestling); NAIA – PCSC; NCCAA Division I – West
- Mascot: Firestorm (Stormin' Norman)
- Website: azcu.edu

Arizona Christian University is a private Christian university in Glendale, Arizona, United States.

== History ==
Academic rankings

Baccalaureate
- Washington Monthly: 234 of 242

Regional
- U.S. News & World Report: 18 of 45

Founded in 1960 as Southwestern Conservative Baptist Bible College, Arizona Christian University's original campus was located at 2625 E. Cactus Road, in Phoenix. Since its founding, the university has undergone a number of name changes, including Southwestern College, until its name was finally changed to Arizona Christian University in January 2011.

The university was founded to prepare students for careers in vocational ministry and missions, offering degrees in Biblical Studies and Christian Ministries. In 1972 the college first received accreditation with the Association for Biblical Higher Education (ABHE) and added regional accreditation through the Higher Learning Commission (HLC) in 1992.

ACU became a non-denominational Christian college in 2007. In 2012, under the leadership of ACU President Len Munsil, the university received approval from the Higher Learning Commission (HLC) to offer degrees in biology, communication, and political science. Additional undergraduate degree programs are being planned. In March 2017, ACU received HLC approval to offer online degrees.

Len Munsil assumed the presidency of Arizona Christian University in 2010. During Munsil's tenure, ACU enrollment has grown from around 400 to more than 1,000 total students, and in 2021 achieved its seventh straight year of record enrollment.

Notable graduates of Arizona Christian University include Mark Bailey, Chancellor and former President of Dallas Theological Seminary, who also began his teaching and academic administration career at then-Southwestern College. Former National Basketball Association All-Star and coach Paul Westphal began his coaching career at then-Southwestern College, leading the school to a Christian college championship.

== Cultural Research Center ==
In March 2020, ACU established the Cultural Research Center in partnership with George Barna, a scholar of American culture and worldview, to research and analyze the impact of the biblical worldview on American culture.

== Athletics ==
The Arizona Christian athletic teams are called the Firestorm. The university is a member of the National Association of Intercollegiate Athletics (NAIA), primarily competing in the Great Southwest Athletic Conference (GSAC) since the 2012–13 academic year; its football team competes in the Frontier Conference; its men's wrestling team competes in the Cascade Collegiate Conference (CCC); and its men's & women's swimming teams compete in the Pacific Collegiate Swim and Dive Conference (PCSC). The Firestorm previously competed as an NAIA Independent within the Association of Independent Institutions (AII) from 2008–09 to 2011–12.

Arizona Christian competes in 22 intercollegiate varsity sports: Men's sports include baseball, basketball, cross country, football, golf, soccer, swimming, tennis, track & field, volleyball and wrestling; while women's sports include basketball, beach volleyball, cross country, golf, soccer, softball, stunt, swimming, tennis, track & field and volleyball. Club sports include badminton, band, bowling, cheerleading, dance, debate, lacrosse and shotgun sports.

In 2013, Arizona Christian announced that it would be adding football in fall 2014.

Jeff Rutter, who was appointed head coach in 2012, was named NAIA National Coach of the Year in 2019.

== Spiritual formation ==
ACU is a non-denominational, evangelical Christian institution where applicants are required to have a personal relationship with Jesus Christ and agree to take part in ACU's spiritual formation activities, which include attending twice-weekly chapel services and taking 18 credit-hours of Bible. Upon application, students also acknowledge their agreement with the university's statement of faith.
