= Len Munsil =

American lawyer

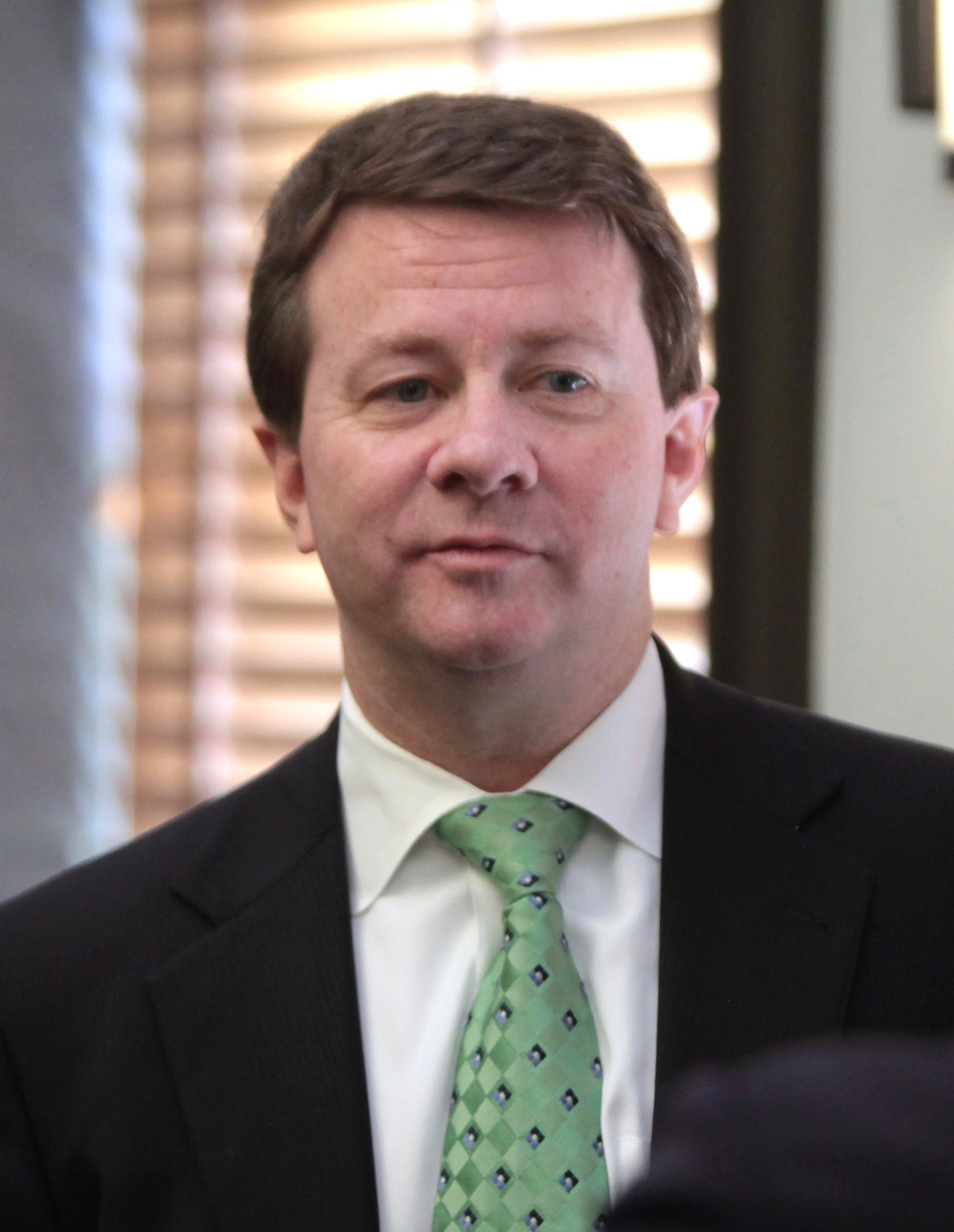
- Munsil in 2016

Personal details
- Born: November 29, 1963 (age 62) Phoenix, Arizona, U.S.
- Party: Republican
- Education: Arizona State University, Tempe (BS, JD)

Len Munsil is an American attorney and the president of Arizona Christian University. He was the founding president for the Center for Arizona Policy, serving from 1996 to 2005. He was also the Republican Party's nominee in the 2006 Arizona gubernatorial election, which he lost. In 2011, Munsil was announced as the permanent president of Arizona Christian University In 2016, he served as a delegate to the Republican National Convention, and a member of the GOP Platform Committee.

== Personal background ==
In 2010, Munsil was named as the sixth president of Southwestern College in Phoenix, Arizona. He had been a member of the Board of Trustees for six years and an adjunct professor, teaching ethics, political science and pre-law courses at the university since 1994.

In his first year as president, Munsil implemented a name change to Arizona Christian University, invited former president George W. Bush to speak at the school's 50th anniversary, drawing 1,260 supporters and raising more than $1.5 million, and presided over the school's largest enrollment and largest freshman class in history. Under his leadership, ACU raised its visibility, expanded its course offerings and majors, undertook campus renovations and building projects, dramatically increased fundraising and experienced large enrollment gains. The university sought to attract students who would "transform culture with truth" – building biblical influence in every corner of society. In 2015 he wrote "Transforming Culture With Truth", explaining how ACU's Core Commitments reflect the biblical principles and values that built Western Civilization, and how young people committed to biblical truth are needed in leadership today. After four straight years of record enrollment, in 2017, Arizona Christian University was recognized for the first time in its history as a "Best College" by U.S. News & World Report, placing 16th among Best Regional Colleges in the 15-state Western region, and the highest-ranked university in its category in the state of Arizona.

Munsil is also known as the founder of the Center for Arizona Policy, a public policy organization emphasizing socially conservative issues. Munsil personally drafted and lobbied seven of the more than 60 laws promoted by CAP since its founding in 1996.

Munsil attended Arizona State University and was the editor of the university's newspaper, The State Press. Under Munsil the editorial direction of the paper became conservative—particularly toward faculty members viewed by Munsil and his student journalist colleagues as too leftist. Munsil was selected Outstanding Journalism Graduate of the Walter Cronkite School of Journalism and Mass Communication.

Munsil has been a licensed attorney since 1988. He is admitted to practice in Arizona and federal courts, including eight U.S. Circuit Courts of Appeal and the United States Supreme Court. He has authored numerous amicus curiae briefs for the U.S. Supreme Court. Munsil served in a judicial clerkship for Judge Daniel A. Manion of the U.S. Court of Appeals for the Seventh Circuit and was appointed by former Arizona Governor Fife Symington to the Arizona Juvenile Justice Advisory Council. He is author or co-author of two legal manuals.

Len and his wife Tracy have eight adult children and reside in Scottsdale. Tracy Munsil earned her master's degree and her Ph.D. in Political Science from Arizona State University, where she taught full-time in the School of Politics and Global Studies. Munsil is now an Associate Professor of Political Science and Chair of the General Education Department at Arizona Christian University, and also chaired the Liberal Arts task force. In 2015 she was appointed by Arizona Gov. Doug Ducey and confirmed by the Arizona Senate for a four-year term on the Arizona Commission on Appellate Court Appointments. Like her husband, she is a former Outstanding Journalism Graduate at ASU, and Editor of the State Press. She home educated for 14 years.

On his father's side Munsil is descended from five signers of The Mayflower Compact and about a dozen men who fought in the American Revolution.

== 2006 Arizona gubernatorial election ==
During the campaign, Munsil was endorsed by four Republican U.S. representatives from Arizona: Jeff Flake, Trent Franks, Rick Renzi, and John Shadegg. He was also endorsed by U.S. senator John McCain and more than 30 state legislators.

Early polls suggested that Munsil had significant ground to make up in the primary, indicating in July that he had a mere 12% of Republican voters behind him. Don Goldwater, nephew of the late U.S. senator and presidential candidate Barry Goldwater, came in second in a four-way Republican primary election on September 12. Munsil received 51% of the vote, while Goldwater garnered 40%. Mike Harris earned 6% and Gary Tupper mustered 4%.

In the general election, just 8 weeks later, Munsil was defeated by incumbent governor Janet Napolitano by a 63% to 35% margin.

Party political offices
| Preceded by Matt Salmon | Republican nominee for Governor of Arizona; 2006 | Succeeded by Jan Brewer |
