= Matt Hostettler =

American politician from Indiana

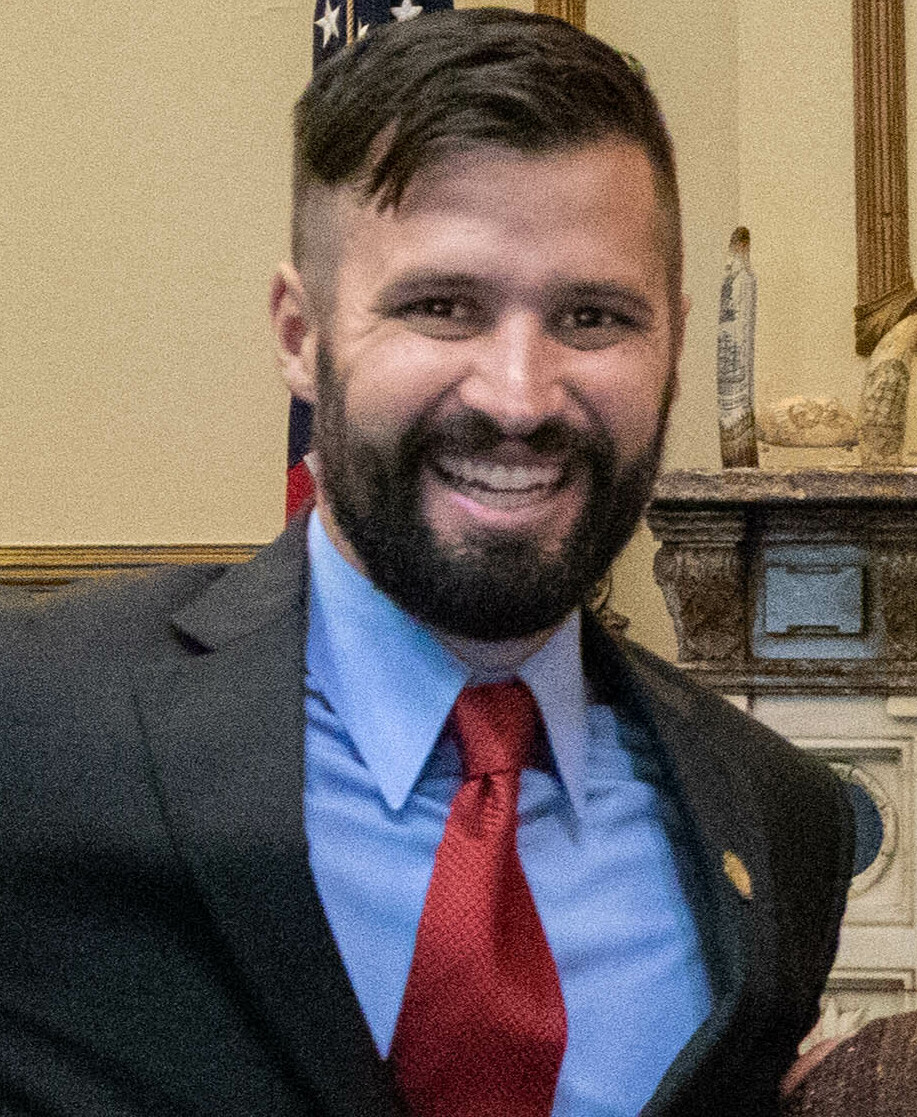

Member of the Indiana House of Representatives from the 64th district
- Incumbent
- Assumed office January 2019
- Preceded by: Tom Washburne

Personal details
- Born: July 17, 1986 (age 40)
- Party: Republican
- Spouse: Michelle
- Relatives: John Hostettler (father)
- Education: Purdue University (BS)

Matthew Hostettler (born July 17, 1986) is an American politician from the state of Indiana. He serves in the Indiana House of Representatives for District 64. He is a member of the Republican Party.

Hostettler is the son of John Hostettler. He worked for CountryMark. In 2018, he ran for the Indiana House and won the Republican Party primary election in 2018 over two opponents. He did not face a Democrat in the general election.
