= V. L. Cox =

American artist

- Born: August 14, 1962 (age 64); Shreveport, Louisiana
- Education: Henderson State University (BFA)
- Known for: Mixed media
- Notable work: End Hate installation series
- Website: www.vlcox.com

V. L. Cox (born 1962) is an American multimedia artist based in Arkansas and New York.

== Early life and education ==
V. L. Cox was born on August 14, 1962, in Shreveport, Louisiana. She originally attended Arkansas Tech University in Russellville, Arkansas to study engineering but later transferred to Henderson State University in Arkadelphia, Arkansas, receiving a BFA in computer graphics in 1991. Her father was an illustrator and engineer, and her great-grandmother from Washington, Arkansas, Louise Virginia Betts Pilkington, was a painter who graduated in 1909 from Lindenwood College for Women in St. Charles, Missouri with a degree in fine art, and whose work is now in the permanent collection of the Historic Arkansas Museum.

== Career ==
Cox started out doing corporate work, pursuing her artistic endeavors on the side. Most notably, in 1995, she designed, constructed, and painted sets and backdrops for the Los Colinas Film Studios and Dallas Theater productions of The Nutcracker, Phantom of the Opera, and Walker, Texas Ranger. The following year, she designed and painted the theme and background for the National Civil Rights Humanities Awards in Memphis, Tennessee, where Leah Rabin, widow of slain Prime Minister Yitzhak Rabin, presented the Award for Freedom. By 1997, she was able to quit her corporate job and become a full-time artist.

Cox's work in the twenty-first century has been highly focused upon issues of human rights and equality. In 2015, she launched her national End Hate installation series, a narrative body of work that looks at discrimination, gender issues, and social culture. The anti-discrimination door series was installed twice on the steps of the Arkansas State Capitol and then at the base of the Lincoln Memorial in Washington, D.C. The installation used authentic and found objects, and images of the door installation went viral and were seen on Yahoo News, USA Today, and in numerous newspapers across the country and as far away as India and South Korea. The project has opened at various locations across the United States, including at the Rosa Parks Museum in Montgomery, Alabama, which coincided with the opening of the Equal Justice Initiative’s National Memorial for Peace and Justice.

The End Hate series was inspired by the proposed Religious Freedom Restoration Act signed by Governor Asa Hutchinson in 2015, which opponents claim would have initially allowed private individuals to discriminate against members of the LGBTQ community by reference to their religious beliefs. The bill was later modified in the wake of national outcry. Her next exhibit, “A Murder of Crows,” focused primarily upon the increasing acceptability of racism in contemporary society.

In 2020, Cox was one of twenty artists in the nation to be featured in "Ministry of Truth: 1984/2020," a New York City billboard project providing “a platform for artists to comment on the current state of US politics and increasing polarization just in time for the election.”

== Awards ==
- Selected for the 1999 Women's Works, Chicago, Illinois. Juried by Susan Sensemann (1999).
- Selected for the 50th Delta Exhibition, Arkansas Arts Center, Little Rock, Arkansas (2007)
- U.S. State Department Invitation, Art in Embassies Program, Democratic Republic of Congo (2008)
- Arkansan of the Year, Arkansas Life (2015)
- Distinguished Alumni Exhibition/Artist, Henderson State University (2015)
- Best Artist, Best of Arkansas, Arkansas Times (2019).
