= Indiana Family Institute =

- Founded: 1994
- Type: Non-profit 501(c)(3)
- Tax ID no.: 35-1790240 (EIN)
- Location: Indianapolis, Indiana
- Region served: Indiana
- Members: 18
- Key people: Curt Smith, President
- Revenue: $466,310 (2013 FY)
- Website: www.hoosierfamily.org

Indiana Family Institute (IFI) is a non-profit lobbying organization in Indiana, United States. Curt Smith serves as the organization's president. IFI gained national attention for its role in the passing of Indiana's Religious Freedom Restoration Act in 2015. The organization is affiliated with Focus on the Family and Alliance Defending Freedom.
