= Troy Woodruff =

American politician

Member of the Indiana House of Representatives from the 64th district
- In office November 3, 2004 – November 8, 2006
- Preceded by: John G. Frenz
- Succeeded by: Kreg Battles

Personal details
- Party: Republican
- Spouse: Melissa
- Children: 2
- Education: Indiana State University (BA)
- Occupation: State Representative (64th District, Indiana)

Troy Woodruff was state representative of Indiana's 64th district, which includes parts of Daviess, Knox, Gibson, and Pike counties, from 2004 to 2006. He ran for re-election in 2006 but was defeated by the Democratic Party candidate, high-school teacher Kreg Battles.

== Criticism ==
Best-known of Woodruff's contributions was his part in establishing daylight saving time in Indiana. While running for office, the public was told he did not support putting Indiana on daylight saving time. However, after becoming more educated about the subject, Woodruff voted in favor of establishing it in the state. This led to much of the public voting against Woodruff in the 2006 election.

Less-known issues that Woodruff pursued included allowing home school students to play sports for public schools. He worked closely with homeschool students to pass legislation legalizing their involvement in public school sports.

== Involvements ==
Woodruff worked for several organizations and politicians, including Indiana Right to Life, U.S. Representative John Hostettler, and Indiana Governor Mitch Daniels. He was appointed chief of staff to the Indiana Department of Transportation in May 2012. He resigned in July 2014.

== Support ==
In his elections, Woodruff was supported by Governor Mitch Daniels' campaign staff as well as local homeschool students. Troy stayed on good terms with homeschool students from Vincennes, Indiana and many of them helped with his campaigns. He was assisted in the 2006 election by a two-week homeschool student project. Among the participants were homeschool students from Illinois, Indiana, Kentucky, and Ohio.
