= Center for Arizona Policy =

Conservative lobbying group

The Center for Arizona Policy (CAP) is a nonprofit conservative lobbying group based in Arizona. The organization advocates for the passage of socially conservative policies in the state. It also produces voter guides to encourage its supporters to elect conservative lawmakers. Over 100 bills supported by CAP have been signed into law in Arizona.

CAP employees co-wrote Arizona's controversial SB 1062, which would have shielded business owners and employees from lawsuits if they refused service to anyone based on what they described as sincerely held religious beliefs. In particular, the bill would have exempted such businesses if they refused to hire or service people because of the person's sexual orientation based on religious beliefs. The bill was vetoed by Governor Jan Brewer.

== History ==
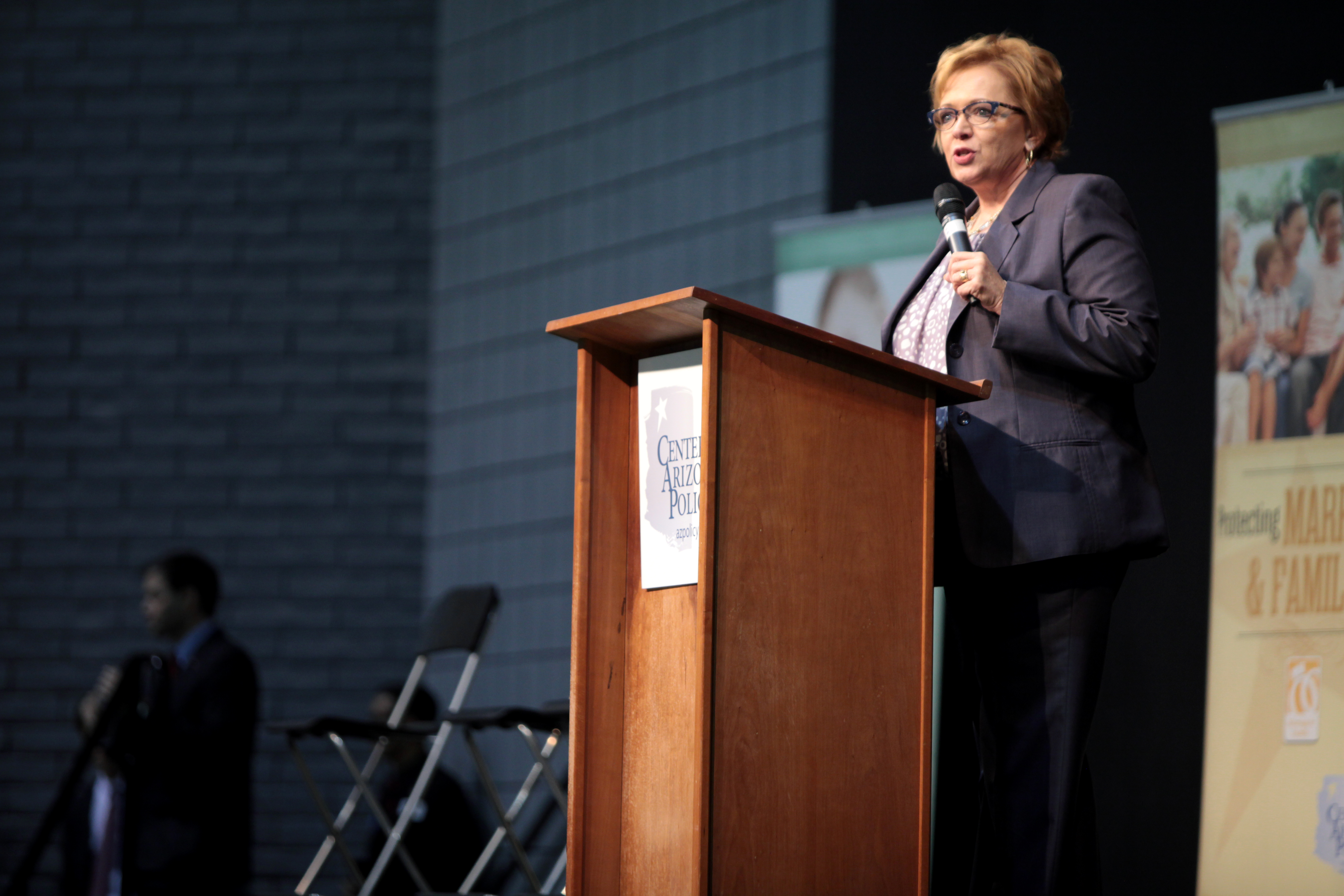
Cathi Herrod

The CAP was founded in 1995 by Len Munsil, who served as the Founding President and General Counsel until 2005. The current President is Cathi Herrod, who joined the organization as legal counsel in 1997.

CAP receives some of its funding from the National Christian Charitable Foundation, an organization primarily funded by the Hobby Lobby craft store company. In 2011, the Foundation awarded $236,250 of the $1.6 million CAP received in grant revenue that year.

== Legislation ==
CAP has supported and lobbied for over 100 bills signed into law in Arizona. In 2012, 13 CAP-supported bills passed, including a law banning abortion after 20 weeks of pregnancy.

=== Abortion ===
The Center for Arizona Policy opposes legal abortion and has supported legislation restricting access to abortion. CAP helped to write a bill in Arizona to require women to explain to their medical providers why they are seeking to have an abortion. Lawsuits against anti-abortion laws have cost Arizona taxpayers more than $2 million, but CAP president, Cathi Herrod, stated that the anti-abortion policies "outweigh the losses in court."

=== Civil Union Ordinances ===
In 2013, the City of Bisbee announced that it intended to legalize same-sex civil unions within the municipality. The Arizona Attorney General, Tom Horne, initially opposed the ordinance but withdrew a legal challenge after the city adopted an amended version of the ordinance that complied with state laws. The Center for Arizona Policy opposed the city's move to offer civil unions and responded with a challenge saying, "If the City of Bisbee enacts a law recognizing a quasi-marital relationship not provided for by Arizona law, it will likely find itself involved in expensive and time-consuming litigation, which it is likely to lose." Following Bisbee, the cities and towns of Clarkdale, Cottonwood, Jerome, Sedona, and Tucson also approved of civil unions.

CAP describes the acceptance of homosexuality in society as "a deceitful and angry ideology" and supports what it describes as a "biblical value that God has a specific intent for sexuality and that it is only realized in the relationship between one man and one woman within the confines of marriage."

=== SB 1062 ===
The Center for Arizona Policy, along with the Alliance Defending Freedom, helped write Arizona Senate Bill 1062, a controversial bill that, if signed into law, would have allowed business owners and employees to refuse to serve anyone based on sincerely held religious beliefs. Supporters of the bill claimed it was meant to protect the religious freedoms of Arizonans, while opponents pointed out that it was intended to allow discrimination against lesbian, gay, bisexual, and transgender people. Top aides for Arizona Governor Jan Brewer worked closely with CAP in crafting the language of the bill, but Brewer, in response to boycott threats and other economic pressure from various national groups, vetoed it on February 26, 2014, a few days after it passed the state Senate and House. CAP and its president Cathi Herrod received a great deal of media attention during the debate over the bill, with several stories highlighting the amount of influence the organization has in Arizona politics.
