= Kansas House Bill 2453 =

Proposed 2014 Kansas law

Kansas House Bill 2453, also known as the Religious Freedom Act, is a piece of legislation proposed in the state of Kansas that would allow people to refuse to provide services in any way related to any relationship (same-sex or otherwise) under the name "marriage, domestic partnership, civil union or similar arrangement" if their objection to doing so is based on their religious beliefs. Representative Charles Macheers (R-Shawnee) introduced the legislation on January 16, 2014. It passed in the House but was not taken up by the Kansas Senate.

== Background ==
Kansas does not have any legislation preventing discrimination on the basis of either sexual orientation and gender identity. Based on an executive order by Governor Kathleen Sebelius, Kansas has prohibited discrimination on the basis of sexual orientation or gender identity (in government employment only) since 2007, and has since been repealed on February 10, 2015 by another Executive Order by the Governor of Kansas Sam Brownback.

Although same-sex marriage is now legal throughout the United States since June 26, 2015, under the Obergefell v. Hodges decision of the Supreme Court of the United States. Supporters of this legislation felt religious individuals and institutions needed protection from getting sued or otherwise punished for denying services to gay and lesbian couples.

== Provisions ==
The legislation says that no individual or religious entity shall be required by any governmental entity to do any of the following, if it would be contrary to the sincerely held religious beliefs of the individual or religious entity regarding sex or gender:

- Provide any services, accommodations, advantages, facilities, goods, or privileges; provide counseling, adoption, foster care and other social services; or provide employment or employment benefits, related to, or related to the celebration of, any marriage, domestic partnership, civil union or similar arrangement.
- Solemnize any marriage, domestic partnership, civil union or similar arrangement.
- Treat any marriage, domestic partnership, civil union or similar arrangement as valid.

== Reception ==
The legislation passed the state's Republican-dominated House on February 12, 2014, by a 72–49 vote. State Senate President Susan Wagle said she anticipated that the bill would not pass the Senate: "A strong majority of my members support laws that define traditional marriage, protect religious institutions, and protect individuals from being forced to violate their personal moral values. However, my members also don't condone discrimination." On February 18, the Catholic bishops of Kansas reiterated their support.

Representative Emily Perry (D-Overland Park) criticized the bill, citing a hypothetical example of emergency services personnel such as a police officer who, arriving at the scene of a domestic violence dispute, could endanger lives by refusing protective services. Holly Weatherford, spokeswoman for the Kansas chapter of the American Civil Liberties Union, said "Kansas would be the first state to legalize discrimination on the part of employees—government employees." The Kansas Chamber of Commerce said it wanted coverage of private businesses and nonreligious entities removed from the bill. Others disputed whether a distinction can be made between acting on the basis of a same-sex marriage and acting on the basis of sexual orientation.

On February 19, Senator Jeff King (R-Independence), Chair of the Senate Judiciary Committee, said his committee would not consider the legislation, ending its consideration.

The bill's opponents characterize it as establishing second-class citizenship for gay, lesbian, bisexual, and transgender (LGBT) people, while its supporters believe it prevents the state from requiring anyone to perform an action he or she sincerely believes to be wrong as a matter of religious principle.

== See also ==
- Arizona SB 1062
- Indiana SB 101
- LGBT rights in Kansas
- State Marriage Defense Act
- List of Kansas state legislatures
