= Religious freedom bill =

Religious liberty protection legislation in the United States

In the United States, a religious freedom bill is a bill that, according to its proponents, allows those with religious objections to oppose LGBT rights in accordance with traditional religious teachings without being punished by the government for doing so. This typically concerns an employee who objects to abortion, euthanasia, same-sex marriage, civil unions, or transgender identity and wishes to avoid situations where they will be expected to put those objections aside. Proponents commonly refer to such proposals as religious liberty or conscience protection.

Opponents of such bills frame them instead as "religious refusal bills", "bigot bills", or as a "license to discriminate", highlighting how much legislation allows individuals and businesses to openly espouse prejudice, especially against LGBT individuals.

== Controversy ==
=== Legal philosophy ===
Law professor Richard Thompson Ford argues that "overly broad conceptions of civil rights protections have turned these important laws against themselves," and that, while each protection may seem coherent on its own, "in combination they constitute a recipe for unresolvable conflicts of absolutes." A less abstract and more pragmatic approach, he argued, might be to accord greater protection to minority religions and to serious injuries. The famous case of Masterpiece Cakeshop fits neither criterion, then, according to Ford, as the baker belonged to the majority Christian religion and the customers weren't significantly injured by having their wedding cake request denied.

=== Moral epistemology ===
Other problems include how to demonstrate whether a belief is sincere, whether it is factually informed and accurately corresponds to the situation at hand, and whether it is indeed "religious" or "moral" in its origin. Indiana University law professor Steve Sanders said that "often there is no way to differentiate between genuine religious convictions and beliefs that are made up out of convenience....an employee who merely has a phobia toward transgender people might still claim a 'religious' exemption, and the employer would have little choice but to grant it."

=== Rhetoric ===
One type of rhetorical frame depicts the religious freedom controversy as a war of identities. The key is selecting identities to illustrate the problem in a way that the illustration speaks for itself. For example, one Catholic nun identified the question of "favoring the civil liberty rights of transgender individuals over the conscience rights of public service providers"; she sided with the public service providers. For a contrasting example, Rev. M Barclay, an openly transgender deacon in the United Methodist Church, described the same question as "Christians using power and privilege to target marginalized demographics like the LGBTQ community". These different angles are discussing the same question.

=== Legal challenges ===
After the January 2018 creation of the Conscience and Religious Freedom Division of the U.S. Dept. of Health and Human Services, Reuters reported that "legal and medical ethics experts said that such exemptions [to antidiscrimination law] have legal limits and would be challenged in court."

In April 2018, a supporter of President Trump was asked to leave a bar in New York City for wearing a "Make American Great Again" hat. The customer's lawyer claimed in court that "The Make American Great Again hat was part of his spiritual belief" (as it is illegal to discriminate against people for their religious beliefs), while the bar's lawyer claimed that "supporting Trump is not a religion." The judge dismissed the case.

In October 2018, conservative Christian groups filed two lawsuits to challenge LGBTQ non-discrimination laws in Austin, Texas: a federal lawsuit, U.S. Pastor Council v. City of Austin, and a state lawsuit, Texas Values v. City of Austin.

Bakery owners Melissa and Aaron Klein were fined by the state of Oregon for refusing in 2013 to sell a cake for a same-gender wedding. They raised money from supporters and appealed to the U.S. Supreme Court, which decided in 2019 to send the case, Klein v. Oregon Bureau of Labor and Industries, back to a lower court.

In September 2019, the Arizona Supreme Court ruled that the Phoenix art studio Brush & Nib cannot be required to print wedding invitations for same-sex couples despite an existing nondiscrimination ordinance in the city. The studio's owners successfully argued that producing custom art for same-sex couples would amount to an endorsement of the marriage, which would violate their religious belief against same-sex marriage.

In 2023, U.S. District Judge Brantley Starr held lawyers for Southwest Airlines in contempt and ordered them to attend “religious-liberty training” from the Alliance Defending Freedom. In 2024, the U.S. Court of Appeals for the Fifth Circuit blocked this order.

== Support ==
=== From U.S. government ===
In May 2018, President Trump signed an executive order creating the White House Faith and Opportunity Initiative, an expansion of existing initiatives created by Bush and Obama. Agencies and offices in the executive branch will have a liaison to the newly expanded initiative if they do not already have a faith-based program of their own.

According to the executive order, the Faith and Opportunity Initiative will "notify the Attorney General, or his designee, of concerns raised by faith-based and community organizations about any failures of the executive branch to comply with protections of Federal law for religious liberty" and seek to "reduce...burdens on the exercise of religious convictions and legislative, regulatory, and other barriers to the full and active engagement of faith-based and community organizations in Government-funded or Government-conducted activities and programs."

In August 2019, the U.S. Department of Labor proposed a new rule to exempt "religious organizations" from nondiscrimination law, saying that such organizations "may make employment decisions consistent with their sincerely held religious tenets and beliefs" and that federal law "should be construed to provide the broadest protection of religious exercise recognized by the Constitution and other laws, such as the Religious Freedom Restoration Act."

In September 2020, the Trump administration proposed that the United Nations emphasize "religious freedom" in place of LGBTQ rights. It had obtained signatures from 57 other countries for its proposal to redefine the U.N.'s understanding of international human rights.

=== From U.S. activists ===
A coalition of conservative Christian organizations called Project Blitz supports, as of May 2018, over 70 bills across the United States, many of which are religious liberty bills. One of the Project Blitz leaders said in a conference call that the goal of having so many similar bills was to force opponents to "divide their resources out in opposing this." In 2017, the Congressional Prayer Caucus Foundation produced a 116-page "playbook" with model legislation; the name "Project Blitz" is not used in this report.

== Contexts in which 'religious freedom' permits discrimination ==
=== Healthcare ===
Many healthcare types are potentially covered by conscience-protection laws. In the U.S., as of 2013, these laws "are increasingly being written in such a way that they would capture mental health professionals".

On January 18, 2018, the United States Department of Health and Human Services announced the creation of a new division within its existing Office for Civil Rights (OCR). The new division is called the Conscience and Religious Freedom Division. It was created to enforce federal laws related to "conscience and religious freedom." That same day, Indiana University law professor Steve Sanders criticized the new approach as having "the potential to impede access to care, insult the dignity of patients, and allow religious beliefs to override mainstream medical science."

==== Positions of medical organizations ====
Many professional organizations for physicians and other healthcare providers have ethics codes that forbid members from refusing care to patients.

The ethics code of the American Medical Association allows physicians to "refuse to participate in torture, interrogation or forced treatment" but not to deny care based on a patient's "race, gender, sexual orientation, gender identity, or any other criteria that would constitute invidious discrimination."

The American Psychological Association believes that students need to learn their future "ethical obligations regarding non-discrimination" and requires broad-based diversity training "because they may grow and change in their beliefs, preferences in populations with whom they would like to work, geographic region, etc." While in some cases it may be appropriate for a mental health provider to refer a patient to another provider, this is not always practical, especially in "schools and rural communities." The organization opposes conscience-clause legislation, seeing it as an "intrusion of state legislatures into the education and training of mental health professionals".

The American Academy of Pediatrics supported repeal of Tennessee's faith-healing law allowing parents to seek "treatment by spiritual means through prayer alone" for their children. In 2008, the organization opposed conscience-clause legislation proposed at the federal level. It released a statement that physicians practicing reproductive medicine, as with any other kind of medicine, have "the obligation to talk with patients about all of their options and, for services which cannot or will not be provided, refer them to someone who can help them without delay".

Scott Johnson, former president of the American Association for Marriage and Family Therapy, said that conscience-based exemptions from discrimination look "simply like prejudice" and that "the problem with conscience is that it can let us do evil as well as good." If a therapist violates AAMFT's Code of Ethics, the organization can remove that person's membership in the professional organization even if state law permits the therapist's behavior. The 2012 version of the Code of Ethics "does not speak directly to matters of therapist values or conscience."

=== Religious schools ===
In 2006, California passed the Nondiscrimination in State Programs and Activities Act (SB 1441) to withdraw state funding from private universities that enforce a "moral code" regarding students' sexual orientation or gender identity. Karen England, executive director of the Capitol Resource Institute, described this as "an outright, blatant assault on religious freedom.”

Between 2013 and 2015, the federal government granted over 30 exemptions to religious colleges who did not wish to comply with federal antidiscrimination law applying to gender identity and sexual orientation, according to a report by the Human Rights Coalition.

In 2017, the Huffington Post examined "private school choice programs that give public money to private religious schools" in the United States and found that "at least 14 percent of religious schools take an active stance against LGBTQ staff and students." In 2020, the Supreme Court decided in Espinoza v. Montana Department of Revenue that states cannot discriminate against religious schools when allocating public funds.

== Religiously motivated reasons for discrimination ==
=== Contraception and abortion ===
Following Roe v. Wade, the landmark abortion rights Supreme Court decision in 1973, "laws were passed to ensure that hospitals or clinics that received federal funds would be unable to force medical personnel who objected to abortion or sterilization on the grounds of their 'religious beliefs or moral convictions' to perform those procedures." At the end of President George W. Bush's administration, "a new 'conscience clause' took effect, cutting off federal funding for institutions that failed to accommodate employees' religious or moral objections."

To those who believe abortion is murder, it may seem "a particularly deadly form of authoritarianism" to "demand that physicians kill their patients or help to arrange for the killing, even if they believe doing so is wrong." By 2005, in at least a dozen U.S. states, pharmacists had cited their personal morality in their refusal to fill prescriptions for birth control, including "emergency contraception" to prevent a fertilized egg from implanting in the uterus.

On July 8, 2020, the Supreme Court ruled in Little Sisters of the Poor Saints Peter and Paul Home v. Pennsylvania that employers and universities may opt out of the Affordable Care Act requirement for private health insurance plans to cover women's contraception without charging any "out-of-pocket cost" to the woman. Prior to the Supreme Court decision, the Trump administration had moved to provide exemptions to employers who claim moral or religious objections to providing contraceptive coverage to their employees, and, in January 2019, a federal judge had blocked these rules from taking effect in 13 states and the District of Columbia.

On March 4, 2019, the U.S. Department of Health and Human Services (HHS) published a Final Rule that would have changed whether family planning service providers were eligible for Title X grants. The next day, the State of Washington filed a lawsuit against HHS (State of Washington v. Azar), complaining that the new HHS rule was in violation of Title X as well as Washington state law. Under Title X, pregnant patients must receive "nondirective pregnancy counseling" (i.e. they must be advised of their options in a factual and unbiased manner), and clinics that provide abortion services should remain eligible for funds. Were the new HHS rule to take effect, nearly all of the current Title X healthcare providers in the State of Washington would be denied funding. The following November, Judge Stanley A. Bastian of the United States District Court for the Eastern District of Washington ruled for the plaintiffs, saying that HHS had overstepped its authority and that its new rule was unconstitutional.

=== Euthanasia (assisted suicide) ===
Physicians can cause a patient's death "actively" (for example, by administering a fatal drug) or "passively" (by withholding food, water, or medical care that would prolong life). This option may be offered to patients who are terminally ill and are severely disabled or in great pain with no hope of recovery. If the patient is unable to communicate or consent, sometimes family members may be asked to decide. This option is called "euthanasia," "assisted suicide," or "mercy killing."

Physicians often consider themselves to be bound to the Hippocratic Oath, the original text of which was written between the fifth and third centuries BCE and requires the physician to promise to not "administer a poison to anybody when asked to do so, nor will I suggest such a course."

In the late twentieth century it became a subject of public debate in the United States in large part due to the work of Jack Kevorkian, who claimed to have assisted 130 patient suicides. Surveys have shown that up to half of U.S. physicians have at some point received patient inquiries about assisted suicide.

The Catholic Church has long opposed euthanasia. In 1980, the Vatican issued a Declaration on Euthanasia that explains: "The pleas of gravely ill people who sometimes ask for death are not to be understood as implying a true desire for euthanasia; in fact, it is almost always a case of an anguished plea for help and love."

=== Same-sex marriage ===
==== United States ====
Some clerks at city halls have refused to issue marriage licenses to same-sex couples. The most famous one is Kim Davis, county clerk for Rowan County, Kentucky, who claimed to be acting "under God's authority" when she protested the nationwide legalization of same-sex marriage in 2015 by refusing to issue marriage licenses to couples of any gender. She served five days in jail for contempt of court. On October 5, 2020, U.S. Supreme Court Justice Clarence Thomas denied a petition from Davis, explaining that the Court's 2015 decision in favor of same-sex marriage (Obergefell v. Hodges) required him to do so and that these "ruinous consequences for religious liberty" would continue unless the Supreme Court someday overturned its own decision. Meanwhile, he lamented, "those with sincerely held religious beliefs concerning marriage will find it increasingly difficult to participate in society." On March 18, 2022, a federal judge ruled that Davis “cannot use her own constitutional rights as a shield to violate the constitutional rights of others while performing her duties as an elected official.”

Similarly, in 2015, a Tennessee judge protested the legalization of same-sex marriage by his refusal to issue a divorce to an opposite-sex couple. He argued that the Supreme Court's ruling revealed that it believed the state of Tennessee "to be incompetent to define and address such keystone/central institutions such as marriage, and, thereby, at minimum, contested divorces" and said that he would wait for further instruction from the Supreme Court.

In 2022, the U.S. Supreme Court said it would hear the case of a wedding website designer in Colorado who wants to limit her business to opposite-sex couples.

==== Australia ====
In December 2018, a year after Australia legalized same-sex marriage, the former Liberal Attorney-General Phillip Ruddock released a report saying that he couldn't find much evidence that anyone's same-sex marriage had caused "actual material discrimination" against anyone who objected to same-sex marriage on religious grounds. Nonetheless, Australia is proceeding with legislation, led by Attorney-General Christian Porter, to prevent discrimination against religious people. Religious hospitals and aged care providers will be allowed to discriminate against LGBTQI employees, as the government announced in November 2019.

In February 2019, Rachel Colvin was pressured to resign an English teaching position she'd held for ten years at Ballarat Christian College because the administration knew that she supported same-sex marriage, even though she offered to keep her beliefs private. She filed a discrimination claim. In May 2019, after rugby player Israel Folau wrote on social media that gay people will go to Hell, he was fired on the grounds that he violated the rugby players' code of conduct. He sued on the grounds that his firing constitutes illegal discrimination against his Christian beliefs.

=== Children of same-sex parents ===
In 2014, two women, Krista and Jami Contreras, met with a pediatrician in Detroit shortly before the birth of their child. When the child was six days old, they arrived for their appointment and were told that the doctor had "prayed on it" and decided she could not provide care for the child. A different doctor had been assigned to the family. The original doctor later wrote to the couple: "After much prayer following your prenatal, I felt that I would not be able to develop the personal patient-doctor relationships that I normally do with my patients."

As of April 2018, five states (South Dakota, Michigan, Alabama, Texas, Oklahoma) allow foster care agencies to refuse to place children with same-sex guardians if the agency has "sincerely held religious beliefs" against same-sex parenting. One story from Texas involves Catholic Charities of Fort Worth turning down a lesbian couple who wanted to foster parent a migrant or refugee child; the couple sued. In January 2019, Health and Human Services granted South Carolina an exemption from non-discrimination rules. The U.S. Supreme Court decided Fulton v. City of Philadelphia on June 17, 2021, ruling that a religious foster care agency that receives taxpayer funds may refuse to serve same-sex couples, even though a nondiscrimination provision is part of its contract with the City of Philadelphia.

=== Gender transition procedures ===
Gender transition is an individualized process. Transgender people may seek medical changes to their sexual characteristics according to their physical and mental needs and preferences. A person may take hormones (often administered by injection), which they will generally then administer on a regular basis for the rest of their life. They may also have various kinds of surgery including breast augmentation or removal, genital reshaping, and removal of reproductive organs. Transgender women may have facial feminization surgery, an "Adam's apple reduction" to remove cartilage from the throat (tracheal shave), and electrolysis to remove unwanted facial and body hair.

Legal and institutional procedures may also be involved. The transgender person may want to change their name and gender marker on their identity documents, healthcare policy, and school or employment registration. This may impact their marriage or divorce proceedings.

They may seek psychotherapy, either because they choose to do so for their own reasons or because it is part of an established process for gender transition. Some physicians will require a referral letter from a psychotherapist. Transgender people "have routinely been asked to obtain an endorsement letter from a psychologist attesting to the stability of their gender identity as a prerequisite to access an endocrinologist, surgeon, or legal institution (e.g., driver's license bureau)".

A healthcare provider or administrative assistant who objects to gender reassignment on principle might wish to decline to participate in any or all of these procedures. One pitfall of such a conscience-based refusal is that it is not always clear-cut when a procedure's primary purpose is gender reassignment. After a person has taken initial major steps to reassign their gender, ongoing procedures (like hormones, electrolysis, or minor surgical corrections) may simply be considered as "maintenance." In case of cancer prevention or treatment, reproductive organs may need to be chemically disabled or removed, and if the patient is coincidentally happy about the removal for their own personal reasons, that does not necessarily mean the procedure is best thought of as a component of gender transition. Cosmetic procedures may be considered part of the universal human desire to look attractive and may not obviously be gender-related. In psychotherapy, a person who happens to be transgender may need to mention problems or circumstances that are related to their gender identity or transition, events that may be years in the past or future; this does not necessarily mean that the psychotherapist is endorsing or helping them complete their gender transition.

On the last day of the 2016 calendar year, just before the Obama administration's new anti-discrimination policy under the Affordable Care Act regarding gender identity and gender stereotypes was to take effect, federal judge Reed O'Connor blocked it. O'Connor believed the anti-discrimination rule conflicted with the Religious Freedom Restoration Act. In April 2018, the Trump administration said it would roll back the anti-discrimination rule.

=== Transgender identity ===
Discriminating against someone for their transgender identity is different than refusing to participate in a specific action they are taking as part of their gender transition. When the person is discriminated against for their identity, the implication is that they are refused a product or service that would normally be considered entirely unrelated to the gender transition they have undergone or want to undergo.

Transgender people already have difficulty accessing healthcare. Healthcare providers often have difficulty recognizing and separating other dimensions of a transgender person's health apart from their gender transition. The 2015 U.S. Transgender Survey found that, just within the past year, 15 percent of respondents said healthcare providers had asked them "unnecessary or invasive questions about their transgender status that were not related to the reason for their visit," while 3 percent were refused "care not related to gender transition (such as physicals or care for the flu or diabetes)."

Roger Severino, director of HHS Office of Civil Rights, in 2018 on the day that the creation of the Conscience and Religious Freedom division was announced, was asked by a journalist whether "someone who is transgender would be denied health care" under the laws in question. He responded: "I think denial is a very strong word...[healthcare] providers...simply want to serve the people they serve according to their religious beliefs". Two days later, a Boston Globe editorial warned that the new HHS Conscience and Religious Freedom division will "allow medical professionals and institutions who claim religious objections to deny coverage to transgender people" which "appears to open the way for a doctor or nurse to turn away a transgender individual with a broken arm – for no other reason than by their gender identity."

In 2022, a middle school math teacher in Geary County, Kansas sued the superintendent, complaining that the school requires her to use each student's preferred name. Her lawsuit said that her "faith teaches her that God immutably creates each person as male or female" and thus she insists on addressing a particular student by their surname, preceded by a gendered title, rather than by the student's chosen first name, without which freedom she says she is "deprived...of due process and equal protection of law".

=== Marital status ===
In the 1990s, there were legal disputes regarding landlords who did not want to rent to unmarried couples.

=== Race ===
Some people claim that racial segregation is part of their religious beliefs. For example, in 2019, one of Hoschton, Georgia's city councilmen, Jim Cleveland, told a newspaper that "my Christian beliefs are you don’t do interracial marriage. That’s the way I was brought up and that’s the way I believe." He additionally told the Atlanta Journal-Constitution that seeing interracial black/white couples "makes my blood boil because that’s just not the way a Christian is supposed to live." Bob Jones University, a fundamentalist Christian school in South Carolina, prohibited interracial dating from the 1950s until 2000.

In 2015, law professor David Bernstein argued that, if ideological consistency is a guide, discrimination against same-sex marriages would lead to discrimination against "interracial or interreligious marriages."

In 2019, the owner of a Mississippi wedding venue informed an interracial couple, "we don’t do gay weddings or mixed race [weddings]…because of our Christian race, I mean, our Christian belief...I don’t want to argue my faith...We just don’t participate. We just choose not to." After public backlash, the owner posted an apology online, claiming to have recently discovered to her surprise that there is no Biblical prohibition on interracial marriage, after all. Regardless of Christian doctrine about interracial marriage, Mississippi's 2016 religious freedom law does not mention race, and therefore it may not have protected this instance of racial discrimination.

In 2018, South Dakota state Rep. Michael Clark (R) commented on the Masterpiece Cakeshop decision, saying that a hypothetical baker should be allowed to turn away not only gay people but also people of color. "He should have the opportunity to run his business the way he wants," Clark wrote on Facebook. "If he wants to turn away people of color, then [that's] his choice." He later deleted the comment and apologized, saying, "I would never advocate discriminating against people based on their color or race."

=== Religion ===
In January 2021, the Holston United Methodist Home for Children informed a prospective adoptive couple that they would not provide adoption services because the couple was not Christian. Both of the prospective parents were Jewish. The couple sued the Tennessee Department of Children's Services.

=== Science ===
On 13 November 2019, Ohio passed the "Student Religious Liberties Act" under which a public school student cannot be penalized for holding a scientifically incorrect belief as long as the student cites a religious reason for denying science. Whether anyone else is affected by one of these scientifically incorrect beliefs might depend on the particular belief and the situation in which it is voiced.

== Side effects of discrimination ==
Apart from the direct injury of any specific instance of discrimination, there may be indirect effects of discriminatory law. Gay, lesbian, and bisexual adults reported an increase in mental distress between 2014 and 2016 if they lived in U.S. states that permitted denial of services to same-sex couples in 2015, whereas straight adults and people living in other states did not report the same increase in mental distress. Similarly, an analysis by scientists at the University of Pittsburgh published in the American Journal of Orthopsychiatry found that, after Indiana passed a religious freedom law in 2015, people in Indiana who identify as lesbian, gay, bisexual, or who question their sexual orientation self-reported worse physical and mental health.

== Federal law ==
In early 2017, a four-page draft of an executive order, "Establishing a Government-Wide Initiative to Respect Religious Freedom", circulated within the new Trump administration. It would have allowed organizations not to comply with existing laws "when providing social services, education, or healthcare; earning a living, seeking a job, or employing others; receiving government grants or contracts; or otherwise participating in the marketplace, the public square, or interfacing with Federal, State or local governments." This exemption was particularly intended to affect choices related to sexuality, reproduction, and gender. It would have applied to "any organization, including closely held for-profit corporations".

The Religious Freedom Restoration Act, signed by Bill Clinton and in effect since 1993, is limited. It cannot be used as a basis for discriminating against employees who identify as lesbian, gay, bisexual, or transgender, according to a federal appeals court in March 2018.

Massachusetts Rep. Joseph Kennedy III sponsored a proposed amendment to the Religious Freedom Restoration Act that would have prevented people from claiming religious exemptions to nondiscrimination laws. The amendment, called the Do No Harm Act (H.R. 3222), did not advance.

In January 2018, the Department of Justice added a section called "Respect for Religious Liberty" to the United States Attorneys' Manual.
