= Thomas Washburne =

American politician

Member of the Indiana House of Representatives from the 64th district
- In office 2013–2019
- Preceded by: Kreg Battles
- Succeeded by: Matt Hostettler

Personal details
- Born: Princeton, Indiana
- Party: Republican
- Education: Purdue University, Indiana University
- Alma mater: Princeton Community High School
- Occupation: Attorney

Thomas Washburne (c. 1963 – ) is an American politician who served as a Republican member of the Indiana House of Representatives, representing the 64th District from 2013 to 2019. In 2017, Washburne announced that he would not be running for reelection to the State House.

== Personal details ==
Thomas Washburne was born around 1963 and comes from Princeton, Indiana. He has five children. He resides in Inglefield, Indiana.

== Career ==
An attorney, Washburne has worked for multiple law firms and represented two Indiana members of the US Congress, including United States Representative John Hostettler, as their chief of staff. Washburne is currently an attorney at Old National Bank in Evansville, Indiana.

== Politics ==
Washburne was reelected to his seat in the Indiana House of Representatives in 2014 after running unopposed in the republican primary and in the general election.

In 2012, Washburne defeated James Amick in the republican primary election and won the 64th district seat against democratic opponent Mark Norton.

Indiana House of Representatives, District 64, Election Results, November 6, 2012

| Candidate | Affiliation | Support | Outcome |
|---|---|---|---|
| Thomas Washburne | Republican | 17,133 | 58.3% |
| Mark Norton | Democrat | 12,255 | 41.7% |

=== Issues ===
==== Capital punishment ====
Washburne spent the 2015 legislative session pushing for more severe capital punishments for specific aggravators as chair of the House Courts and Criminal Code Committee. Senate Bill 385, which passed the Senate and has moved on to the House, would allow for defendants to receive the death penalty or a conviction of life without parole if they are charged of committing murder on a school grounds or in a place of religious worship. Washburne, who is a strong supporter of capital punishment, says that both of those situations warrant being added to the list of aggravators, which already includes defendants charged with dismembering a body.

==== Religious Freedom Restoration Act, 2015 ====
Washburne also voted for Indiana's version of the Religious Freedom Restoration Act, which was signed into law by Indiana Gov. Mike Pence on April 2, 2015. He supports the law, which protects Indiana businesses and business owners' freedom of religion and does not allow for interference from state and local government. Washburne says it's important that citizens of Indiana have religious freedoms, even those that others "might be appalled by."
