= The Indianapolis Star =

Daily newspaper in Indianapolis, Indiana, United States

- Type: Daily newspaper
- Format: Broadsheet
- Owner: USA Today Co.
- Editor: Eric Larsen
- Founded: June 6, 1903; 123 years ago
- Language: American English
- Headquarters: 130 South Meridian Street; Indianapolis, Indiana 46225; United States
- Circulation: 14,900 Average print circulation 3,889 digital subscribers
- ISSN: 1930-2533
- Website: indystar.com

The Indianapolis Star (also known as IndyStar) is a morning daily newspaper that began publishing on June 6, 1903, in Indianapolis, Indiana, United States. It has been the only major daily paper in the city since 1999, when the Indianapolis News ceased publication. It won the Pulitzer Prize for National Reporting in 2021 and the Pulitzer Prize for Investigative Reporting twice, in 1975 and 1991. It is currently owned by Gannett.

== History ==
=== 20th century ===
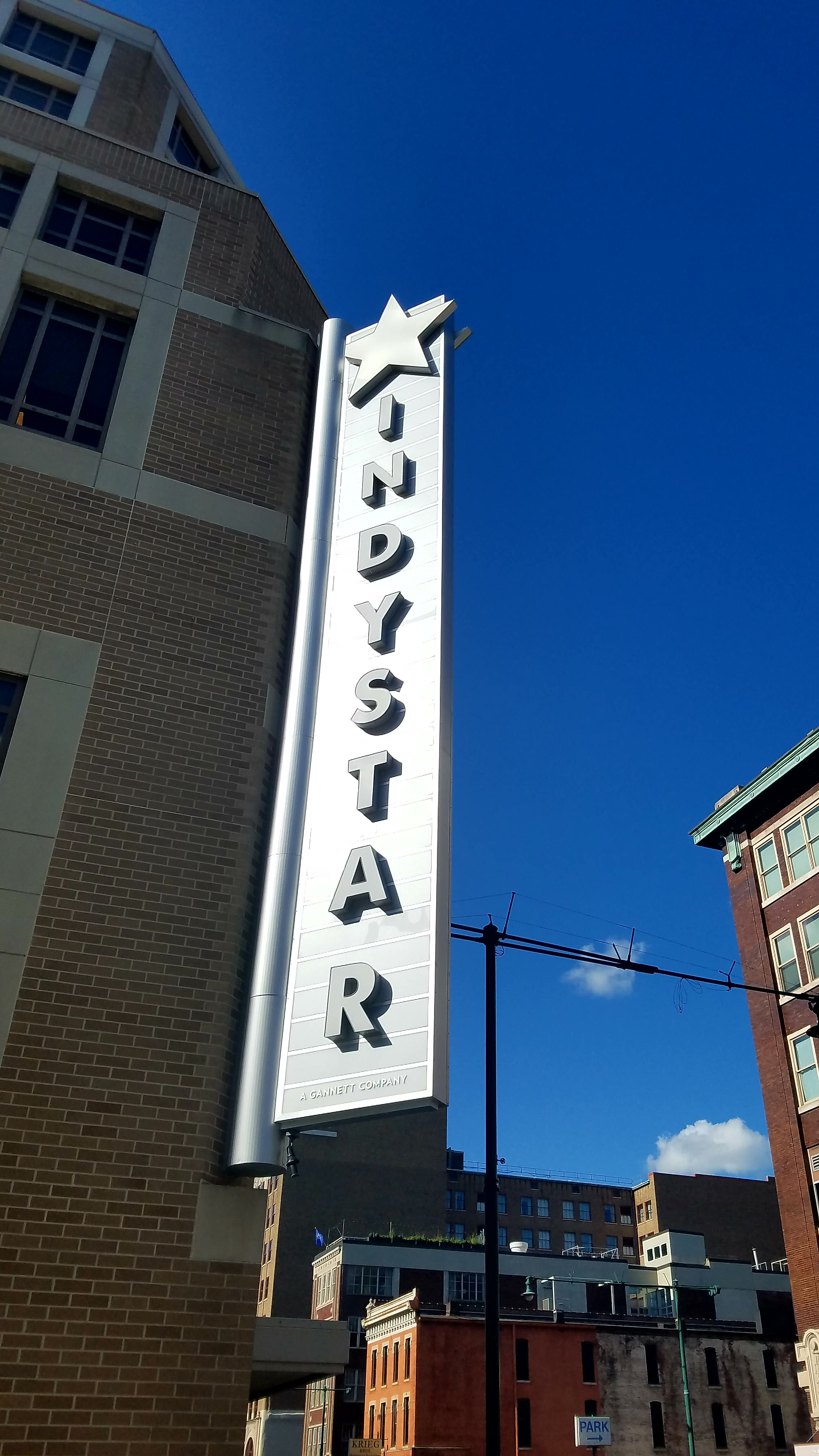
The Star marquee on the headquarters in downtown Indianapolis

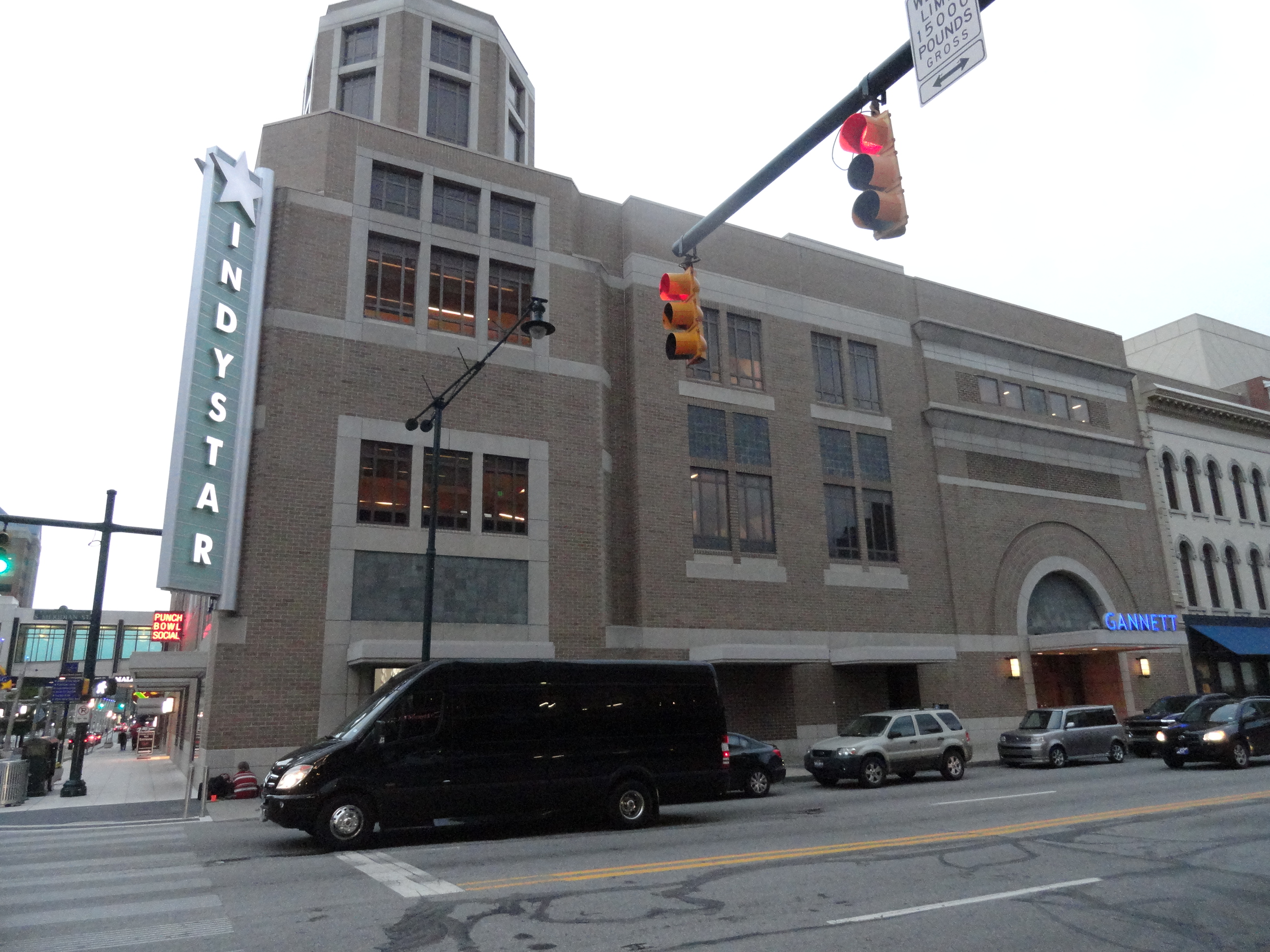
Headquarters of The Indianapolis Star in Downtown Indianapolis

The Indianapolis Star was founded on June 6, 1903, by Muncie industrialist George F. McCulloch as competition to two other Indianapolis dailies, the Indianapolis Journal and the Indianapolis Sentinel. It acquired the Journal a year and two days later, and bought the Sentinel in 1906. Daniel G. Reid purchased the Star in 1904 and hired John Shaffer as publisher, later replacing him. In the ensuing court proceedings, Shaffer emerged as the majority owner of the paper in 1911 and served as publisher and editor until his death in 1943.

Central Newspapers, Inc. and its owner, Eugene C. Pulliam, the maternal grandfather of future Vice President Dan Quayle, purchased the Star from Shaffer's estate on April 25, 1944, and adopted initiatives to increase the paper's circulation. In 1944, the Star had trailed the evening Indianapolis News but by 1948 had become Indiana's largest newspaper.

In 1948, Pulliam purchased the News and combined the business, mechanical, advertising, and circulation operations of the two papers, with the News moving into the Star's building in 1950. The editorial and news operations remained separate. Eugene S. Pulliam took over as publisher upon the death of his father in 1975, a role he retained until his own death in 1999.

In September 1995, the newsroom staffs of the Star and the News merged. In 1999, the News ceased publication, leaving the Star as the only major daily paper in Indianapolis. Soon thereafter the trustees of Central Newspapers, Inc., the owner of the Star and other newspapers in Indiana and Arizona, began investigating the sale of the small chain to a larger entity.

=== 21st century ===
In 2000, the Gannett Company acquired the paper, amongst others when it purchased Central Newspapers for $2.6 billion, leaving Indianapolis with no locally owned newspaper other than the Indianapolis Recorder, a weekly mainly circulated in the African-American community.

On July 27, 2012, the Star announced that it would relocate from its headquarters at 307 North Pennsylvania Street, and later that the new location would be the former Nordstrom department store in Circle Centre Mall. The move took place from the summer to fall of 2014. The old location had been used since 1907.

After Larry Nassar, USA Gymnastics national team osteopathic physician, was sentenced to up to 175 years in prison in January 2018 for sexually abusing female athletes, the prosecutor in the case specifically praised the Star for uncovering Nassar's decades-long history of abuse. The Star began its investigative reporting into Nassar and USA Gymnastics in 2016 and published its first related article in August 2016 when it shed light on USA Gymnastics' failure to properly investigate credible complaints of sexual abuse or pass the complaints on to police. After the August 2016 story, one of Nassar's victims, Rachael Denhollander, approached the Star about Nassar and USA Gymnastics' failure to investigate her complaint about him, resulting in a September 2016 story on Nassar specifically. After the Nassar story, the Star was approached by many of Nassar's victims who shared similar stories of abuse. Nassar was charged with criminal sexual conduct in November 2016. Athlete A, a documentary released in 2020, follows the journalists as they investigate the Nassar.

== Pulitzer Prizes ==
The Star has won the Pulitzer Prize once for national reporting and twice for investigative reporting. In 1975, the Star was honored for its 1974 series on corruption within the Indianapolis Police Department. It was cited again in 1991 for its 1990 series on medical malpractice. In 2021, the Star was awarded a Pulitzer Prize for National Reporting for an investigation into attacks by police K-9 units.

== Production facilities ==
The Indianapolis Star at one time had the largest and most advanced printing presses in the nation. The Pulliam Production Center at 8278 N. Georgetown Road on the northwest side of Indianapolis cost $72 million and covers 200,000 square feet (19,000 m^{2}). It opened in November 1995 as a packaging center and started printing numerous newspapers including The Indianapolis Star in 2001. The press hall that houses the four MAN Roland Geoman presses has 30,672 square feet (2,850 m^{2}) on two levels. Each of the presses weighs 2,100 short tons (1,900 t), stands seven stories tall, and can print 75,000 papers an hour.

In January 2023, Gannett laid off 50 employees at the Pulliam Production Center. At the time the facility employed 145 people. A year later Gannett announced the center would close April 9 and printing of The Indianapolis Star would move to the company's press site in Peoria, Illinois.

== See also ==
- Fix This Now
- Mass media in Indianapolis
