= Arkansas HB 1228 =

2015 Arkansas law

Arkansas HB 1228, also known as the Conscience Protection Act and the Religious Freedom Restoration Act, is a law in the state of Arkansas that aims to increase "judicial scrutiny" in cases involving religious beliefs. Opponents of the law say that it will allow for lawful discrimination of LGBT people. The law was passed by the Arkansas Senate on March 31, 2015. The next day, Governor Asa Hutchinson announced he would not sign the bill as written, instructing the legislature to make changes to its language. The final version was passed and signed into law as Act 975.

== Background ==
Politifact reports that "Conservatives in Indiana and elsewhere see the Religious Freedom Restoration Act as a vehicle for fighting back against the legalization of same-sex marriage." In 2015, the Alabama Supreme Court ordered a halt to the issuing of same-sex marriage licenses, Kansas rescinded an LGBT anti-discrimination order, and Arkansas prohibited anti-discrimination codes being enacted by cities and local governments.

The bill was sponsored by Republican state representative Bob Ballinger and Republican state Senator Bart Hester.

== Reaction ==
Walmart, Apple, and Acxiom have publicly criticized the law, which is similar to Indiana SB 101, a law passed in Indiana a few days earlier. Walmart CEO Doug McMillon called on Governor Hutchinson to veto the legislation.

Hundreds of protesters rallied at Arkansas' Capitol to oppose the bill.

The law inspired the "End Hate" installation series by Arkansas artist V. L. Cox, which was installed on the grounds of the Arkansas State Capitol and subsequently traveled the nation.

== Similar bills in other states ==
A similar bill in Georgia has stalled, with constituents expressing concern to Georgia lawmakers about the financial impacts of such a bill. A meeting on the bill was cancelled. Supporters of the bill have stated that the bill would be "gutted" by the inclusion of anti-discrimination clause. The convention industry in Georgia has stated that a $15 million business could be at risk of boycotts.

After the Burwell v. Hobby Lobby Stores, Inc. decision, the definition of religious beliefs has expanded from the beliefs of individual employees to the practices of closely held for-profit corporations. Georgia State Rep. Stacey Evans, R-Smryna, proposed an amendment to change references of "persons" to "individuals," which would have eliminated corporations from the protection of the bill. State Rep. Barry Fleming, R-Harlem, noted that such a move would negate the "closely held corporation" protection granted last year by the U.S. Supreme Court in the Hobby Lobby case. The amendment was rejected.

Texas SJR 10 and HJR 55 plan to introduce a similar bill that changes the language from "substantially burden" to "burden". The Texas Business Association voted to oppose the bills. Molly White introduced a bill that would expressly grant private businesses the right to “refuse to provide goods or services to any person based on a sincerely held religious belief or on conscientious grounds.”

A similar bill in North Carolina has stalled, with commentators predicting a backlash similar to Indiana's.
