= List of court cases involving Alliance Defending Freedom =

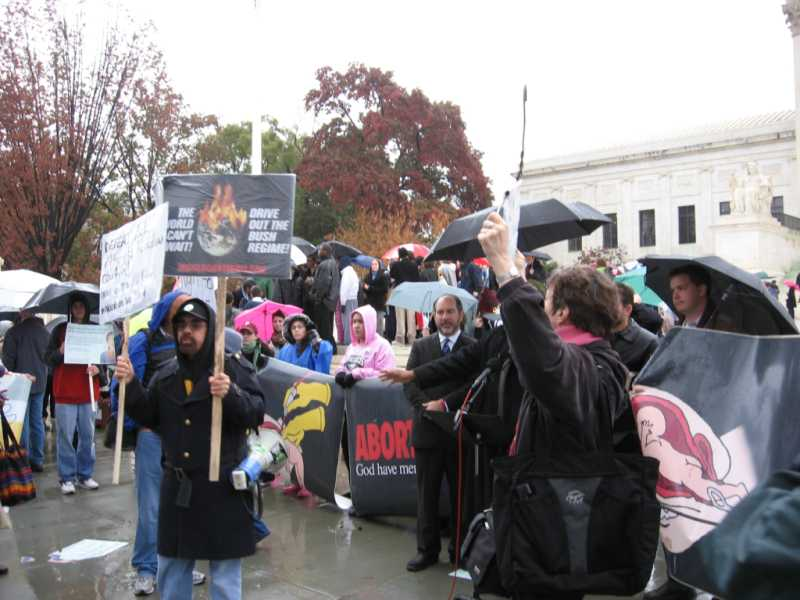
Pro-life and pro-choice activists demonstrate on the steps of the United States Supreme Court building during Gonzales v. Carhart.

Alliance Defending Freedom (ADF) is an American advocacy organization whose goal is advocating, training, and funding legal cases on the issues of "religious freedom, sanctity of life, and marriage and family." In 2012 the organization shifted its mission of funding allied attorneys to direct representation of clients though litigation. Founded in 1993, ADF has been described as "the largest legal force of the religious right arguing hundreds of pro bono cases across the country.

Alliance Defending Freedom (ADF) has been involved in several landmark United States Supreme Court cases, including Rosenberger v. University of Virginia, Good News Club v. Milford Central School , and Town of Greece v. Galloway. Rosenberger was described by law professor Marci Hamilton as a "fork in the road" with respect to judicial review of the Establishment Clause of the First Amendment. Good News Club and Town of Greece established precedents relating to free speech and the establishment clauses of the First Amendment respectively. ADF also litigated a 2014 case challenging the Affordable Care Act, or Obamacare. In Burwell v. Hobby Lobby Stores, Inc., the Court ruled that the birth control mandate in employee-funded health plans was unconstitutional, since there existed a less restrictive means of furthering the law’s interest. The case set a precedent for evaluating legal questions relating to religious liberty. ADF also played a role in Dobbs v. Jackson Women's Health Organization, writing model legislation for the Mississippi abortion ban, but did not represent either party in court.

== List of cases ==
Following are legal cases in which the ADF has played a role, either by representing a party, filing an amicus brief, or otherwise participating:

=== 1995 ===
- Rosenberger v. University of Virginia (1995). ADF provided funding to defend a student newspaper which was denied university funding due to its religious nature. The case was litigated all the way to the Supreme Court.

=== 2001 ===
- Good News Club v. Milford Central School (2001). The ADF assisted in this case in which the Supreme Court ruled that religious clubs must be afforded equal access to school facilities.

=== 2004 ===
- City of Littleton (CO) v. Z.J. Gifts (2004). The Supreme Court ruled unanimously against an adult bookstore in a case involving business licensing.
- Elk Grove Unified School District v. Newdow (2004). The Supreme Court, in a unanimous opinion, reversed a United States Court of Appeals for the Ninth Circuit decision that the words “under God” in the Pledge of Allegiance violated the First Amendment due to a lack of standing.
- Williams v. Vidmar (2004). In November 2004, the ADF filed a lawsuit on behalf of a Cupertino, California elementary school teacher against his school principal and school board members. The lawsuit was settled without money changing hands and without changes in school policies.
- Perry v. Schwarzenegger. ADF represented Proposition 8 proponents ProtectMarriage.com in the Federal lawsuit challenging the constitutionality of the proposition, which limited marriage in California to one man and one woman. Their participation generated some criticism. The religious rights law firm Liberty Counsel, which has litigated opposition to same-sex marriage in California since 2004, criticized Alliance Defense Fund's handling of the case.

=== 2006 ===
- Scheidler v. National Organization for Women (2006). Anti-abortion groups were charged with racketeering. In a unanimous decision the Supreme Court ruled in favor of the anti-abortion groups.
- Ayotte v Planned Parenthood of Northern New England (2006). In a unanimous decision the Supreme Court held that states have a right to require parental notification for abortion.
- The ADF defended Elane Photography in its appeal of being found in violation of the New Mexico Human Rights Act for refusing to photograph a 2006 civil commitment ceremony. In August 2013 the New Mexico Supreme Court found in favor of Willock and that the photographer was in violation of the act.

=== 2007 ===
- Gonzales v. Carhart (2007). This case upheld the Partial-Birth Abortion Ban of 2003.

=== 2011 ===
- Arizona Christian School Tuition Organization v. Winn (2011). The ADF prevailed against the ACLU in a case regarding a taxpayer funded school choice program.

=== 2012 ===
- Bronx Household of Faith v. Board of Education of the City of New York (2012). The ADF lost this case challenging New York City's prohibition on holding worship services in the City's public schools, and the Supreme Court declined to hear the case.

=== 2014 ===
- Town of Greece v. Galloway (2014). In a significant victory, the Supreme Court ruled that opening legislative sessions with prayer was constitutional.
- McCullen v. Coakley (2014). ADF obtained a unanimous Supreme Court victory in this case which struck down “buffer zones” which were designed to restrict anti-abortion activists. The ruling was a setback for the abortion rights groups.
- Burwell v. Hobby Lobby Stores, Inc. (2014). In this landmark Supreme Court case, where ADF represented Conestoga, the justices struck down the contraceptive mandate of Obamacare as applied to those with religious objections.
- The ADF served as co-counsel defending Sally Howe Smith, Court Clerk for Tulsa County (Oklahoma), whose denial of a marriage license to a same-sex couple was challenged in Bishop v. Oklahoma. Smith lost in U.S. District Court in January 2014.
- The ADF represented Dr. Mike Adams in a lawsuit against University of North Carolina Wilmington. A first amendment victory in the United States Court of Appeals for the Fourth Circuit opened the door to a civil trial in which Adams was also victorious. The case concerned denial of promotion to full professor due to constitutionally-protected speech.
- In Bostic v. Rainey, the ADF represented Ms. Michele McQuigg, defendant-intervenor in her official capacity as Prince William County Clerk of Circuit Court; the defendants lost in US District Court in February 2014.
- The ADF defended Virginia's laws against a challenge to the prohibition on same sex marriage, but lost an appeal in the 4th Circuit Court of Appeals on Monday, July 28, 2014; they have stated that they plan to appeal the ruling.

=== 2015 ===
- Reed v. Town of Gilbert (2015). In a First Amendment case, a pastor's right to place signs announcing church services was upheld by the Supreme Court.
- Holt v. Hobbs. The Supreme Court, in a unanimous decision, held that an Arkansas prison policy which prevented an incarcerated Muslim man from growing a short beard in accordance with his deeply-held religious beliefs violated the Religious Land Use and Institutionalized Persons Act.

=== 2016 ===
- Zubik v. Burwell. Two ADF cases, Geneva College v. Burwell and Southern Nazarene University v. Burwell were consolidated into Zubic and heard before the Supreme Court in 2016. The case addressed non-church coverage of mandated contraceptives under Obamacare. The individual cases were returned to the respective courts of appeal.

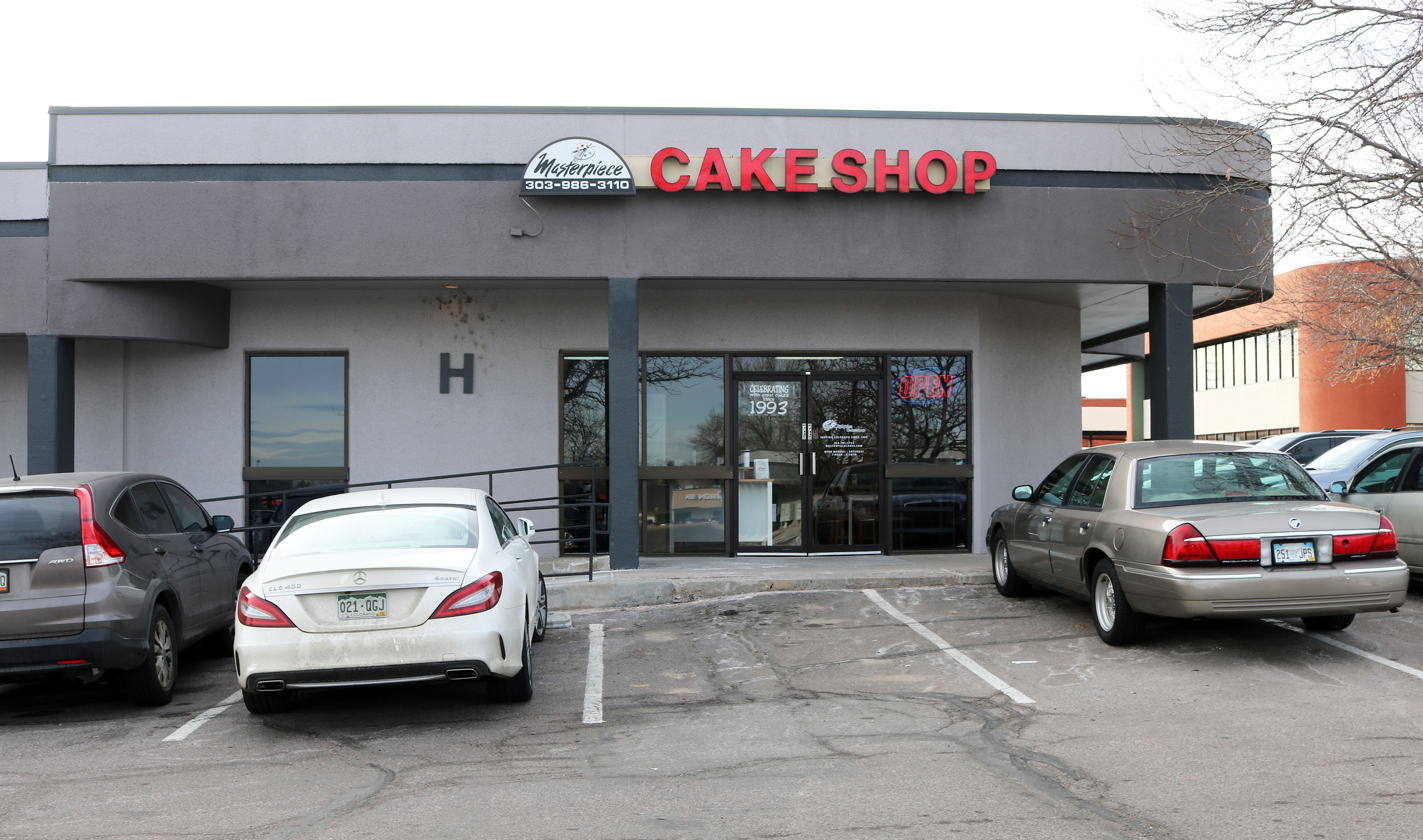
Masterpiece Cakeshop in Lakewood, Colorado.

Audio recording of oral argument at Masterpiece Cakeshop.

- Arlene's Flowers lawsuit. The Washington State Supreme Court rejected a florist's First Amendment claim and ruled in favor of a gay couple who were denied service. The case has been submitted to the United States Supreme Court for consolidation with Masterpiece Cakeshop.

=== 2017 ===
- Trinity Lutheran Church of Columbia, Inc. v. Comer (2017). In an important First Amendment case the Supreme Court ruled that a Missouri playground resurfacing program violated freedom of religion guaranteed by the Free Exercise Clause. ADF represented the petitioner.

=== 2018 ===
- Masterpiece Cakeshop v. Colorado Civil Rights Commission. The lawsuit had the potential of setting a "landmark" First Amendment precedent, according to Fox News.
- National Institute of Family and Life Advocates v. Becerra. Oral arguments in this anti-abortion case were heard at the Supreme Court in 2018. The case pertained to California's FACT Act which mandated crisis pregnancy centers to provide certain disclosures. The high court found those notices to be a free speech violation of the First Amendment.
- Cochran vs. City of Atlanta. After Kelvin J. Cochran was fired by Atlanta Mayor Kasim Reed, a judge declared unconstitutional the city's preclearance rules on what employees could do on their own time outside work. Atlanta ended up agreeing to pay $1.2 million to Cochran.

=== 2019 ===
- Brush & Nib v. City of Phoenix. Two Christian artists who owned a stationery store did not want to make custom wedding invitations for same-sex couples on religious grounds, and wished therefore to have an exemption from a Phoenix, Arizona anti-discrimination ordinance. The artists were represented by ADF. Lower court rulings upheld the city ordinance, but the Arizona Supreme Court ruled in September 2019 that, based on the Arizona Constitution, the ordinance violated the free-speech rights of the artists. The ruling was on narrow factual grounds and pertained only to custom wedding invitations and the artists' right to free speech, and neither granted them a blanket exemption from the ordinance, nor was it a ruling on whether the law was constitutional. Other businesses which wished to be exempt from the law would need to seek their own court order. The 4-3 decision did not address whether Phoenix's adoption of LGBTQ people as a protected class was legal.
- Lexington-Fayette Urban County Human Rights Commission v. Hands On Originals. ADF represented Blaine Adamson and his printing company, Hands on Originals, after he had been requested to create t-shirts for a local pride festival hosted by the Gay and Lesbian Services Organization (GLSO). Blaine declined the order because creating a t-shirt with the requested message would violate his religious beliefs. The Kentucky Supreme Court unanimously upheld that the GLSO lacked standing to sue Hands on Originals.
- Thompson v. Hebdon. The state of Alaska imposed campaign contribution limits for individuals to political candidates, individuals to election-related groups, political parties to candidates, and total out-of-state donations to a candidate. The petitioners challenged the individual-to-candidate and individual-to-group limits of $500. In a per curiam opinion, the Supreme Court vacated the 9th Circuit’s ruling, noting that the lower court failed to apply Randall v. Sorrell (2006), which invalidated a Vermont law limiting individual contributions.

=== 2020 ===
- R.G. & G.R. Harris Funeral Homes Inc. v. Equal Employment Opportunity Commission. A landmark Supreme Court case ruling that Title VII protection applies to gay and transgender people.
- March for Life Education and Defense Fund v. California. In 2017, the Trump administration issued new HHS rules consistent with the Burwell v. Hobby Lobby Stores, Inc. (2014) and Zubik v. Burwell (2016) decisions that exempted privately held for-profit corporations and religious institutions from the contraceptive mandate of the Affordable Care Act. Several states, including California and Pennsylvania, challenged these new HHS rules as a violation of the Administrative Procedure Act (APA). Organizations such as the Little Sisters of the Poor as well as March for Life Education and Defense Fund intervened in the lawsuit to defend the new rules. In a 7–2 decision, the Supreme Court upheld the new rules in Little Sisters of the Poor Saints Peter and Paul Home v. Pennsylvania (2020). In light of that decision, the Supreme Court vacated the 9th Circuit’s ruling against March for Life.

=== 2021 ===
- Meriwether v. Hartop, on whether professor was entitled, based on his Christian beliefs, to use pronouns that did not match a student's gender identity and to refuse to use that student's first name, in violation of the university's contrary anti-discrimination policy. The Sixth Circuit court ruled in the professor's favor in finding that the university had not adequately accommodated his religious beliefs.
- Uzuegbunam v. Preczewski. ADF represented Georgia Gwinnett College student Chike Uzuegbunam, who was twice stopped from preaching on campus. After ADF filed a lawsuit alleging a violation of Uzuegbunam’s free speech rights, the college changed its speech policies, rendering Uzuegbunam’s claims moot and leading to a dismissal of the case in the lower district and appellate courts. ADF appealed to the Supreme Court, asking the college to be held liable for nominal damages. In an 8–1 decision, the Supreme Court held, “A request for nominal damages satisfies the redressability element necessary for Article III standing where a plaintiff’s claim is based on a completed violation of a legal right.”
- Thomas More Law Center v. Bonta. This case challenged California's requirement for non-profit organizations such as the Thomas More Law Center to disclose the identity of their donors to California's Attorney General in order to solicit donations in the state. The case was consolidated with Americans for Prosperity v. Bonta. The Supreme Court ruled 6–3 that California's requirement burdened the donors' First Amendment rights.
- OSHA Rule on COVID-19 Vaccination and Testing

=== 2022 ===
- Dobbs v. Jackson Women's Health Organization overturned Roe v. Wade (1973), a case that had established a constitutional right to abortion; abortion access is now controlled by state legislatures. ADF lawyers did not represent parties in this case, but they wrote a model law that Mississippi's legislature enacted, and the Supreme Court upheld the law.

=== 2023 ===
- Soule v. Connecticut Association of Schools. In 2020, several high school female athletes represented by ADF filed a complaint challenging a Connecticut Interscholastic Athletic Conference policy allowing transgender women to compete in the female category. Plaintiffs allege the policy violates Title IX and denies opportunities for people assigned female at birth. A trial court ruled that the plaintiffs lacked standing to bring suit. The U.S. Court of Appeals for the Second Circuit upheld that ruling in December 2022, but granted a rehearing en banc in February 2023. The case currently awaits the en banc panels decision.
- Alliance for Hippocratic Medicine v. FDA. The Alliance for Hippocratic Medicine, represented by ADF, is challenging the FDA’s approval of mifepristone in 2000, as well as its subsequent deregulation, including allowing distribution of the drug by postal mail. The case currently awaits a decision on the merits from the U.S. Court of appeals for the 5th Circuit.
- 303 Creative LLC v. Elenis. Lorie Smith, a graphic designer, sought a pre-enforcement challenge against a Colorado public accommodations law that would have compelled her to create expression about same-sex marriages that violated her religious beliefs. In a 6–3 decision, the Supreme Court ruled that the First Amendment forbade the state of Colorado from forcing her to create expressive designs with messages with that contradict her beliefs. This case follows Masterpiece Cakeshop (2018), in which Jack Phillips, another ADF client, challenged the same Colorado law. Masterpiece was decided in Phillips’s favor but on narrower grounds.
- Arizona Christian University v. Washington Elementary School District. In February 2023, the Phoenix-area Washington Elementary School District (WESD) voted to not renew a partnership agreement with Arizona Christian University (ACU) because of the university’s Christian beliefs on gender and sexuality. For 11 years, education students from ACU had served as student teachers in WESD classrooms. ADF filed suit representing ACU for religious discrimination, leading the school district to settle the lawsuit and renew its agreement with ACU.
- DeJong v. Pembrook. ADF represented Maggie DeJong, a graduate student at Southern Illinois University Edwardsville (SIUE). While at the university, she expressed her opinions in class discussions and on social media, views informed by her Christian faith and conservative viewpoint. Some students reported her speech as “harmful,” and the university issued three no-contact orders against her and opened an investigation. After receiving a letter from ADF, the university rescinded the no-contact orders and suspended the investigation. ADF then filed a lawsuit against SIUE in May 2022 for violating DeJong’s civil and constitutional rights. In July 2023, SIUE settled the lawsuit, agreeing to have three professors undergo First Amendment training by ADF attorneys.
- T.F. and B.F. v. Kettle Moraine School District
- L.M. v. Town of Middleborough
- Mid Vermont Christian School v. Saunders
- Mead v. Rockford Public School District

=== 2024 ===
- FDA v. Alliance for Hippocratic Medicine
- Moyle v. United States
- Tennessee v. Cardona
- Turning Point USA at SUNY Cortland v. Cortland College Student Association
- The Babylon Bee v. Bonta

=== 2025 ===
- Chiles v. Salazar
- Oklahoma Statewide Charter School Board v. Drummond
- Little v. Hecox
- First Choice Women's Resource v. Platkin
- West Virginia v. B.P.J.
- National Institute of Family and Life Advocates v. Clark
- Labrador v. Poe
- Camp IdRaHaJe Association v. Roy
- Medina v. Planned Parenthood South Atlantic

== See also ==
- List of United States Supreme Court cases involving the First Amendment
