= Blackstone Legal Fellowship =

American legal training program

- Motto: "Learn. Lead. Defend."
- Type: Legal internship
- Established: 2008
- Affiliation: Alliance Defending Freedom
- Location: Scottsdale, Arizona, USA
- Website: blackstonelegalfellowship.org

The Blackstone Legal Fellowship is an American legal training and summer internship program for Christian law students, developed and facilitated by the Evangelical Christian legal group Alliance Defending Freedom (ADF). About 3,000 law students have participated in the program. Its main campus is in Scottsdale, Arizona. Among its faculty are Missouri U.S. Senator Josh Hawley and U.S. Supreme Court Associate Justice Amy Coney Barrett. ADF co-founder and president Alan E. Sears said that the program's goal was to put Christian lawyers into "positions of influence, thereby impacting the legal culture and keeping the door open for the Gospel."

== Overview ==
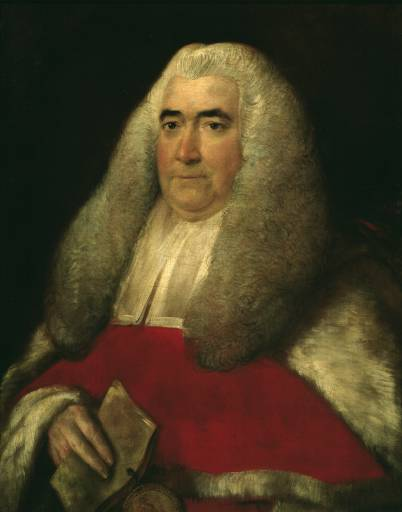
Sir William Blackstone in 1774

Blackstone Legal Fellowship was founded in 2000 with a class of 24 interns. In 2012, when Sears was asked about the major achievements of ADF, he said "among the things I am most thankful for are our Blackstone Legal Fellowship graduates." The program is named for Sir William Blackstone, the eighteenth century English legal scholar and jurist whose commentaries on the common law had, according to some legal scholars, a profound impact on the founders of the United States. Blackstone training program promotes the doctrine of "natural law."

== Training ==
Students spend two weeks of classroom training on legal philosophy, constitutional interpretation and jurisprudence, and Christian worldview development. Afterward, they complete "field placement" summer internships at government offices, law firms, public interest advocacy groups and corporations. Placements are based on students' aptitude and career goals. The students then attend a week of classroom instruction on professional development as well as training in legal and cultural engagement.

== Controversy over Amy Coney Barrett's membership ==
In 2017, President Donald Trump's nominee to the United States Court of Appeals for the Seventh Circuit, Amy Coney Barrett, was criticized by Senator Al Franken for teaching constitutional law at Blackstone. In her Senate committee hearing he referred to ADF as a "hate group." Barrett responded that the hate group label is "controversial." Barrett was confirmed to the court by the Senate.

== People ==
The following is a list of notable people who affiliated with Blackstone.

- Amy Coney Barrett, taught constitutional law at Blackstone. Currently associate justice on the United States Supreme Court.
- J. Budziszewski, professor, member of Advisory Board of Blackstone
- Robert P. George, legal scholar, member of Blackstone Advisory Board
- Mary Ann Glendon, former U. S. Ambassador to the Holy See, current member of Blackstone Advisory Board
- Edwin Meese, former Attorney General of the United States, currently member of Blackstone Advisory Board
- Charles E. Rice, former legal scholar and member of Blackstone Advisory Board
- Andrew Sandlin, Christian minister and theologian, faculty member at Blackstone
