= Kristen Waggoner =

American constitutional lawyer (born 1972)

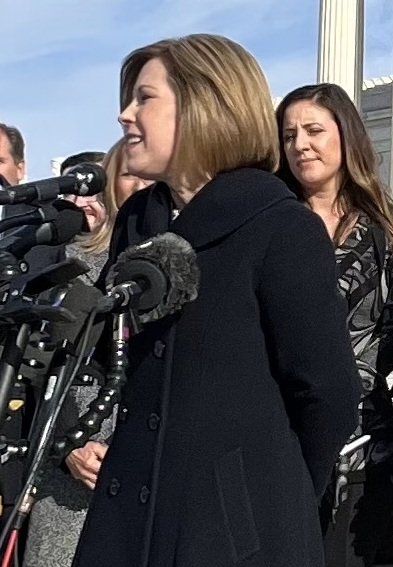
- Waggoner speaking at a press conference, 2018
- Born: Kristen Kellie Behrends; 1972 (age 53–54); Longview, Washington, U.S.
- Education: Northwest University (BA); Regent University (JD)
- Spouse: Benjamin Waggoner
- Children: 3

Kristen Kellie Waggoner (born 1972) is an American attorney. She has been president, CEO, and chief counsel of Alliance Defending Freedom since 2022.

Waggoner was the lead defense counsel in Masterpiece Cakeshop v. Colorado Civil Rights Commission in 2018 and represented Lorie Smith and 303 Creative in 303 Creative LLC v. Elenis in 2023, both notable wins at the Supreme Court.

== Early life and education ==
Waggoner was born in 1972 in Longview, Washington, about an hour outside of Portland, as the eldest of four children. Her father was a school superintendent and a licensed Assemblies of God minister. Her mother was a stay-at-home mom who worked part-time in the accounting industry.

Waggoner attended Christian schools from primary school through law school. Her father was the principal during her 1st through 12th grades. In high school she played volleyball and basketball. She graduated high school as valedictorian.

She attended Northwest University, affiliated with the Assemblies of God, on a drama scholarship. After graduating magna cum laude from Northwest, she attended Regent University School of Law. At Regent she won "best oralist" at the Whittier Moot Court Competition, a national contest. She graduated cum laude in 1997 with a Juris Doctor.

== Career ==
After law school, Waggoner was a law clerk to Justice Richard B. Sanders of the Washington Supreme Court. She also interned with U.S. Representative Linda Smith. In 1998, she entered private practice with Ellis, Li & McKinstry, a Seattle law firm. Waggoner was made partner in 2004.

=== Alliance Defending Freedom ===
Waggoner joined ADF in 2013 and moved to the firm's Scottsdale headquarters in 2014. During her tenure, ADF has won as lead counsel in nine Supreme Court cases, including Masterpiece Cakeshop v. Colorado Civil Rights Commission.

On October 1, 2022, Waggoner succeeded Michael Farris as CEO and president of ADF, retaining her role as general counsel.

Audio recording of oral argument at Masterpiece Cakeshop.

==== Arlene's Flowers ====
Waggoner represented the florist in the Arlene's Flowers Lawsuit when it was heard in the Washington State Supreme Court, arguing the case on First Amendment grounds. The court ruled against her.

On June 25, 2018, the U.S. Supreme Court granted the petition for a writ of certiorari, vacated the judgment, and remanded the case to the Supreme Court of Washington for further consideration in light of the Masterpiece Cakeshop decision. On June 6, 2019, the Washington Supreme Court unanimously ruled against Stutzman again, finding no evidence of religious animus. Stutzman's attorneys once again requested the U.S. Supreme Court to take her case, but certiorari was denied in July 2021. Stutzman opted to settle with Ingersoll in November 2021, paying him $5,000.

==== Masterpiece Cakeshop ====
The case Masterpiece Cakeshop arose from a dispute between Jack Phillips, a baker, and a gay couple after Phillips refused to bake a same-sex wedding cake for the couple. The case made its way to the Supreme Court which took oral arguments on December 5, 2017. Regarding her presentation, David A. French of National Review wrote: "[Waggoner] strongly and clearly made the most vital point — the issue was the artistic message, not the identity of the customer." In 2018, Phillips won in a 7–2 ruling.

==== 303 Creative LLC v. Elenis ====
Following the Masterpiece Cakeshop case, Waggoner represented Lorie Smith when 303 Creative LLC v. Elenis was heard in the United States Supreme Court, arguing that a Colorado anti-discrimination law violated Smith's free speech rights. Smith, a web designer and owner of 303 Creative, elected to withhold her services from same-sex weddings, as this would go against her religious beliefs. In a 6–3 decision, the Court ruled in favor of Smith, determining that the state of Colorado could not compel the designer to create work that violates her values. The origins of this case are under suspicion and have undermined the confidence in the court. Smith, designer and owner of 303 Creative, was not in the market for weddings at all.

== Personal life ==
Waggoner is married to Benjamin Waggoner, who also graduated from Regent Law School in 1997. The couple has three children. She is Pentecostal.
