= Klein v. Oregon Bureau of Labor and Industries =

2013 legal case

Coordinates: 45.5040°N 122.4301°W

- Court: Oregon Court of Appeals
- Full case name: Melissa Elaine Klein, dba Sweet Cakes by Melissa, and Aaron Wayne Klein, dba Sweetcakes by Melissa v. Oregon Bureau of Labor and Industries
- Decided: December 28, 2017
- Citation: 289 Or. App. 507 (2017)

Case history
- Prior action: In re Klein, dba Sweetcakes by Melissa, BOLI Final Order, Nos. 44-14 & 44-15 (July 2, 2015)
- Appealed from: Administrative adjudication by the Oregon Bureau of Labor and Industries

Court membership
- Judges sitting: DeVore, Presiding Judge, and Judges Garrett and James

Case opinions
- Decision by: Garrett

Klein, dba Sweet Cakes by Melissa, v. Oregon Bureau of Labor and Industries was a legal case against a cake shop in Gresham, Oregon, in the United States. The cake shop gained widespread press attention in January 2013 when it turned away customers who wanted cakes for a same-sex wedding, who then made a complaint to the Oregon Bureau of Labor and Industries, claiming their civil rights under the Oregon Equality Act had been infringed.

== Case history ==
On January 17, 2013, a woman and her mother were invited to a Gresham, Oregon, bakery called "Sweet Cakes by Melissa" (owned by the couple Melissa Elaine Klein and Aaron Wayne Klein) for a scheduled wedding cake tasting appointment. The woman selected the bakery after having been a customer previously. Upon introductions, Aaron Klein asked for the names of the "bride and groom," at which point the customer said there were actually two brides. On hearing this, Klein informed them that the bakery does not make wedding cakes for same-sex weddings because of their religious beliefs. When the woman's mother tried to object, Klein responded by quoting Leviticus 18:22, which refers to male homosexual sex as an "abomination."

The customer subsequently filed a complaint with Oregon's Bureau of Labor and Industries, alleging the bakery had discriminated against her and her fiancée because of their sexual orientation. Aaron Klein responded by posting a copy of the complaint's first page on their Facebook page, which contained the full names and contact information of the customer and her fiancée. When the couple discovered this, they had their lawyer contact Klein, who then removed the posting. While only up for a single day, this posting ultimately resulted in death threats against the couple and their family.

On February 1, 2013, news media became aware of the case despite the couple's efforts to avoid public attention. A few weeks after, a demonstration occurred outside the bakery criticizing their refusal to make the cake, though it was organized by individuals with no association with the original couple, and the couple did not attend it. After receiving extensive criticism on Facebook and in the news, the Kleins closed their storefront in September 2013, switching to operating the business from their home.

In April 2015, an administrative court made a preliminary decision to fine the business $135,000. The Kleins in turn opened a GoFundMe page, "Support Sweet Cakes by Melissa", which raised over $100,000 before it was shut down by GoFundMe, who stated that the campaign violated their terms of service. Go Fund Me later released a statement saying that the Kleins would receive all the donations. In a statement, GoFundMe confirmed that the funds raised before the appeal was shut down would still be available for withdrawal.

The administrative court's decision was confirmed in a final order by the Oregon Bureau of Labor and Industries in July 2015. The final text of the order reads as follows:

Respondents Aaron Klein and Melissa Klein to cease and desist from publishing, circulating, issuing or displaying, or causing to be published, circulated, issued or displayed, any communication, notice, advertisement or sign of any kind to the effect that any of the accommodations, advantages, facilities, services or privileges of a place of public accommodation will be refused, withheld from or denied to, or that any discrimination will be made against, any person on account of sexual orientation.

The cease and desist order has been widely described as a gag order, and has brought national attention to this case on First Amendment free speech grounds. However, this part of the order was consistent with another Oregon state law (ORS 659A.409) which prohibits businesses from advertising an intention to discriminate against customers, including on the basis of sexual orientation.

The Kleins stated that they would contest the Bureau's decision. However, after appealing for 6 months, Aaron Klein paid the final order with interest, though still stating he would continue to appeal the order on free speech grounds. In December 2017, an appeals court upheld the amount of the penalty, as well as making a determination that the original decision did not violate the Kleins' freedom of speech, as it simply "requires their compliance with a neutral law." The opinion issued by the court contained several interpretations on matters of contention. First, the court rejected the Kleins' argument that there was a distinction between sexual orientation and "gay conduct" (i.e. a same-sex wedding) and found "we hold that their refusal to serve the complainants is the type of discrimination 'on account of sexual orientation' that falls within the plain meaning" of the state law. Second, the court found the Kleins' failed to demonstrate their wedding cakes are protected speech, art, or expression under the First Amendment. Third, it rejected their argument that the state's statute violates the Free Exercise Clause. Fourth, the court rejected the Kleins' argument that the commissioner issuing the original order was biased and that the fine was excessive. The final part of the opinion concluded that there was insufficient evidence the Klein's violated a specific state law (ORS 659A.409) regarding threatening or advertising they would unlawfully discriminate against persons in the future, though there was no fine associated with this specific charge.

In March 2018, the Kleins filed an appeal to the Oregon Supreme Court. In June 2018, the Oregon State Supreme Court refused to hear the case allowing the lower court rulings to stand.

The Kleins then filed an appeal to the United States Supreme Court. In June 2019, the Supreme Court granted the writ of certiorari and vacated the standing ruling by the Oregon Appeals Court, requiring that court to rehear the case in the light of the Masterpiece Cakeshop v. Colorado Civil Rights Commission decision in 2018.

In January 2022, the Oregon Court of Appeals, reviewing the case in light of the Supreme Court's decision, found that the Oregon commission violated the First Amendment's Free Exercise Clause by failing to act neutrally toward the Kleins’ religion. The court struck the $135,000 damages award because of this. However the court contended that the Kleins had still violated the law and sent the case back to the Oregon's Bureau of Labor and Industries to re-examine.

In July 2022, the Oregon Bureau of Labor and Industries imposed a reduced fine of $30,000.

In September 2022, attorneys for the Kleins announced that they were again appealing to the U.S. Supreme Court to review the Kleins' case.

On June 30, 2023 the Supreme Court of the United States again intervened in the case and issued a Writ of Certiorari and vacated the judgement again, and returned it, for a second time, to the Court of Appeals of the State of Oregon, in light of their decision 303 Creative LLC v. Elenis.
