= Pulpit Freedom Sunday =

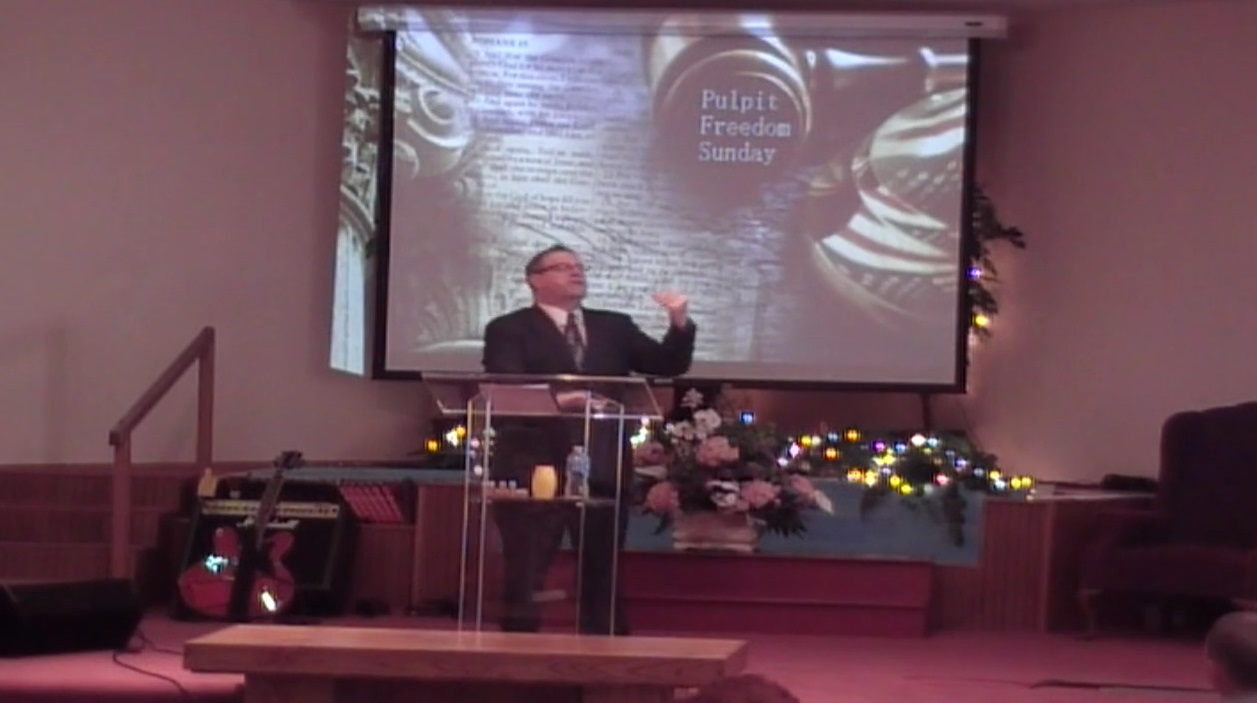
Pulpit Freedom Sunday in 2011

In the United States of America, Pulpit Freedom Sunday is an annual event which is held in some churches. It was founded in 2008 by Alliance Defending Freedom (ADF) to challenge the prohibition on places of worship from endorsing political candidates. According to The New York Times, ADF's campaign has become "perhaps its most aggressive effort."

== Background ==
In 1954 then Senator Lyndon B. Johnson was running for re-election to the U.S. Senate. In order to neutralize opposition from two nonprofit groups who accused him of being a communist, Johnson introduced an amendment to the Internal Revenue Service code–the Johnson Amendment–which prohibited non-profit groups from endorsing political candidates. This legislation had far reaching effects not only on non-profits, but churches, synagogues, and other houses of worship. Before enactment of the Johnson Amendment, religious leaders were free to endorse or oppose candidates for office. Churches registered as 501(c)(3) organizations under the tax code are subject to revocation of their tax-exempt status should the IRS rule that they violated the political speech prohibition.

Alliance Defending Freedom opposes the Johnson Amendment. Its position is explained: "Churches are not tax-exempt because of some bargain they make with the government. Being tax-exempt is part of freedom of religion; otherwise the government could tax churches out of existence. Now the government is telling churches you can be tax-exempt if you don't speak out on a certain topic".

In 2017 the Free Speech Fairness Act was introduced in the United States House of Representatives. The legislation proposes to permit political speech in churches. ADF supports passage of the bill.

== History ==
In 2008 ADF launched Pulpit Freedom Sunday with 35 churches—including several mega-churches–to directly challenge the Johnson Amendment. In acts of civil disobedience, pastors give sermons on "blatantly political" topics, which may include providing "biblical perspectives" on or endorsements of particular candidates, in defiance of IRS regulations and in hopes of triggering a First Amendment court challenge to the provisions. The 2008 event included Minnesota reverend Gus Booth, who encouraged his congregation to vote in the 2008 United States presidential election for Senator John McCain, and prohibited them from voting for Senator Barack Obama because of his position on abortion.

By 2014 participation in the event had grown to over 1,800 pastors, of whom 1,517 preached sermons presenting "biblical perspectives on the positions of electoral candidates". 3,800 pastors had expressed support for 'pulpit freedom' since 2008. In response, the IRS indicated that it would increase enforcement of the prohibition against candidate endorsement at churches.

== See also ==
- Religious Freedom Restoration Act
