= Alliance Defending Freedom =

American Christian legal advocacy group

- Abbreviation: ADF
- Formation: March 25, 1993; 33 years ago
- Type: 501(c)(3) non-profit organization
- Tax ID no.: 54-1660459
- Headquarters: Scottsdale, Arizona, U.S.
- Chairman: Terry Schlossberg
- President and CEO: Kristen Waggoner
- Budget: $104,000,000 (2022)
- Revenue: $120 million (2025)
- Expenses: $109 million (2025)
- Endowment: $20,295,829 (2022)
- Employees: 395 (2022)
- Volunteers: 217 (2025)
- Website: adflegal.org
- Formerly called: Alliance Defense Fund

The Alliance Defending Freedom (ADF), formerly the Alliance Defense Fund, is an American 501(c)(3) nonprofit conservative Christian legal advocacy group. It works to expand Christian religious practices within public schools and in government. ADF is headquartered in Scottsdale, Arizona, with branch offices in several locations including Washington, D.C., and New York. Its international subsidiary, Alliance Defending Freedom International, with headquarters in Vienna, Austria, operates in over 100 countries.

ADF is one of the most organized and influential Christian legal interest groups in the United States based on its budget, caseload, network of allied attorneys, and connections to significant members of the political right. Mike Johnson, a former ADF attorney, was elected speaker of the House of Representatives on October 25, 2023. Others who have been associated with ADF include U.S. Supreme Court justice Amy Coney Barrett, former vice president Mike Pence, former attorneys general William Barr and Jeff Sessions, and Senator Josh Hawley. Since the election of President Donald Trump, ADF has become "one of the most influential groups informing the [Trump] administration". It has been designated by the Southern Poverty Law Center as an anti-LGBT hate group.

As of 2025, ADF was included in at least 74 Supreme Court decisions and directly represented 15 parties in Supreme Court wins. It has taken positions including support for religious activity in public school and Christian prayer at town meetings, narrowing insurance coverage for contraceptives, prohibiting same-sex marriage, and supporting businesses in the wedding industry that refuse to service gay marriages. ADF lawyers wrote the model for Mississippi's anti-abortion legislation, leading to the Supreme Court decision in Dobbs v. Jackson Women's Health Organization to overrule Roe v. Wade that had established a right to abortion in America in 1973. ADF's representation in two cases has been accused of citing inaccurate or falsified evidence.

== History and structure ==
=== Founding ===
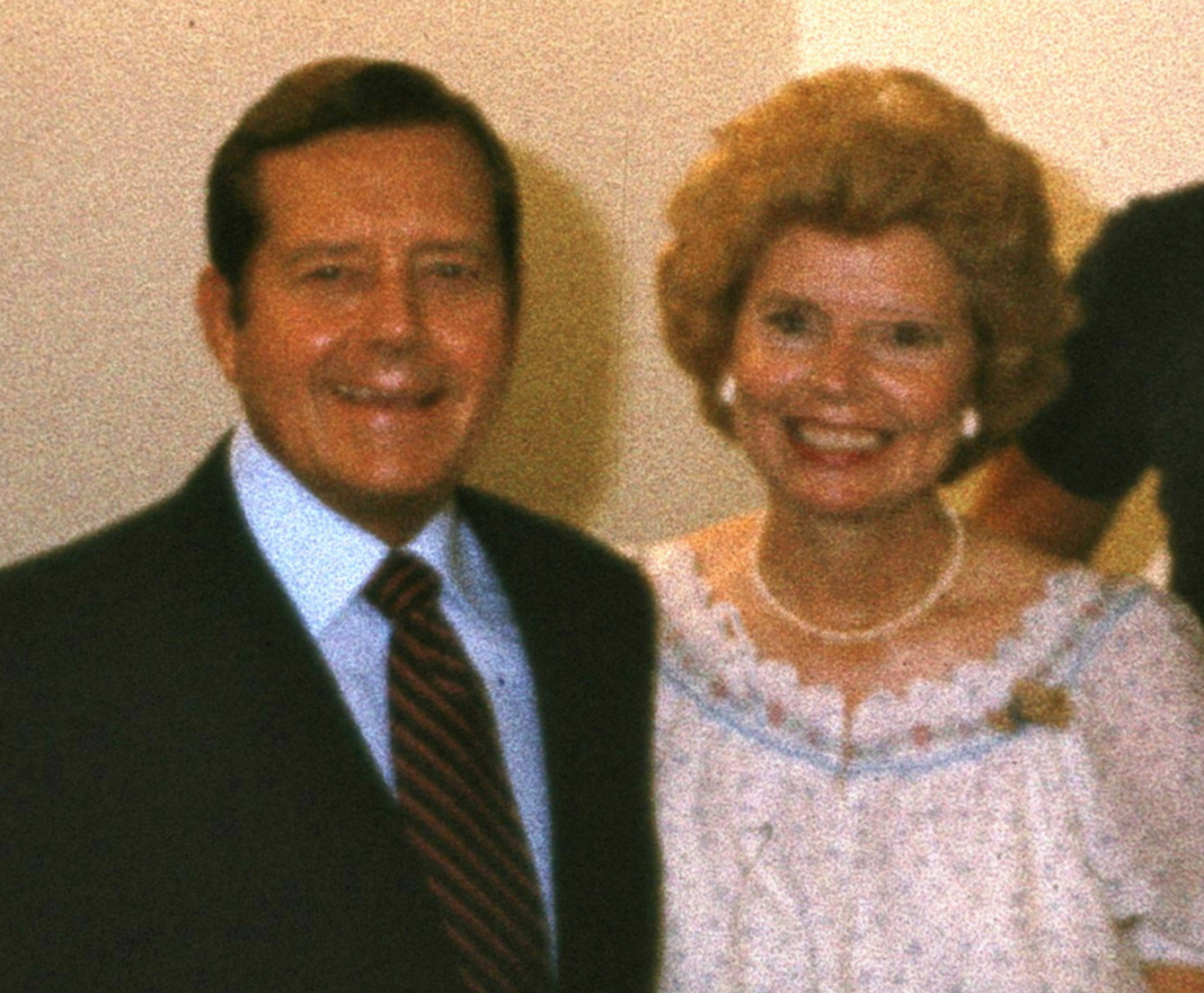
Bill and Vonette Bright

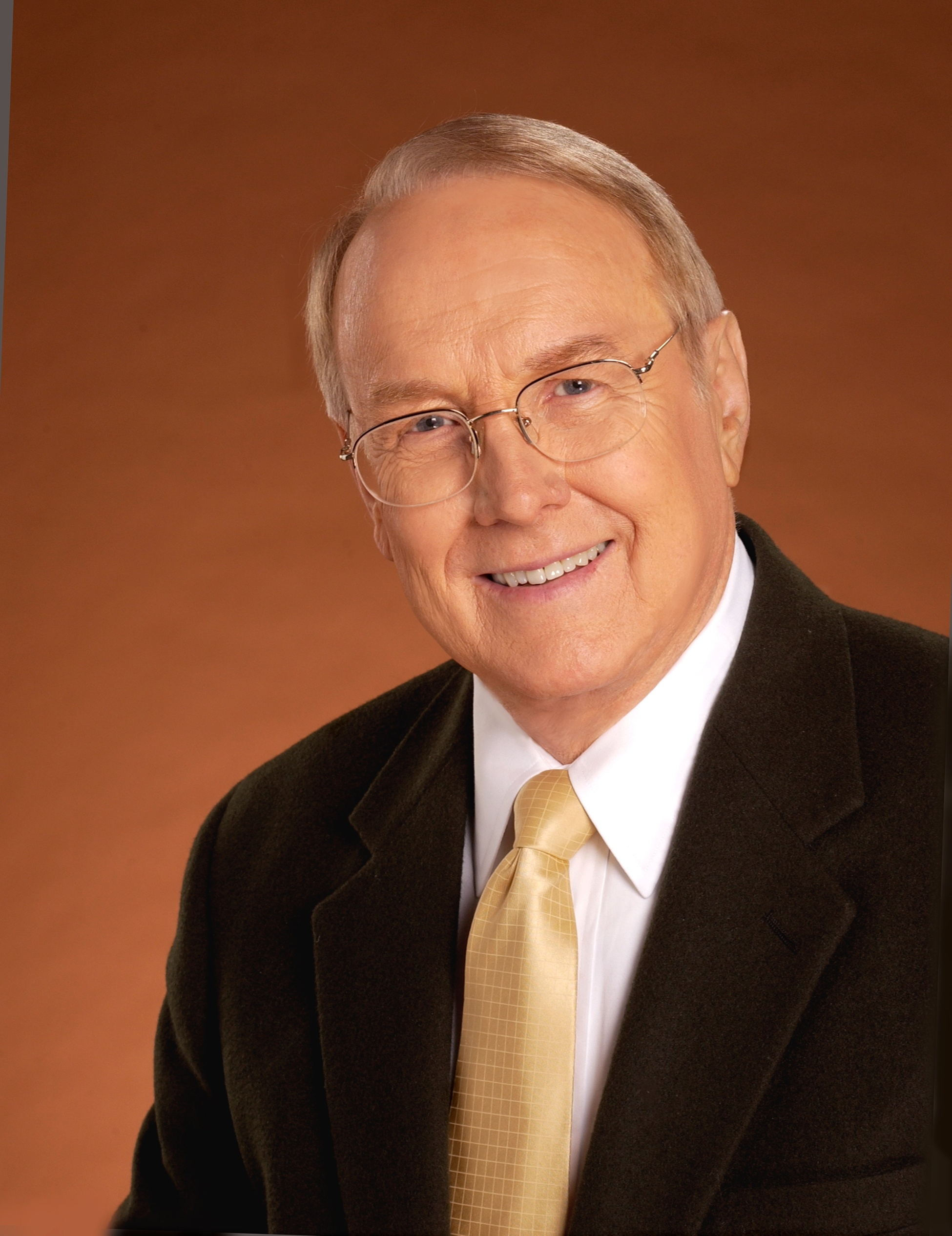
James Dobson

Co-founders of Alliance Defense Fund, the predecessor to Alliance Defending Freedom

The Alliance Defense Fund was founded by members of the Christian right movement to prevent what its founders saw as threats to religious liberty in American society. ADF was incorporated in 1993 by six conservative Christian men, most of whom belonged to evangelical movements. The co-founders were Bill Bright, who also founded Campus Crusade for Christ; Larry Burkett; James Dobson, founder of Focus on the Family; D. James Kennedy, founder of Coral Ridge Ministries; Marlin Maddoux; Mark Siljander; and Alan Sears. ADF is a tax-exempt 501(c)(3) organization.

In its early years, Alliance Defense Fund funded legal cases rather than litigating directly. It particularly targeted the work of the American Civil Liberties Union, which its founders saw as contributing to an erosion of Christian values.

=== Shift to direct litigation ===
The Alliance Defense Fund changed its name to Alliance Defending Freedom in 2012. The name change was intended to reflect the organization's shift in focus from funding allied attorneys to directly litigating cases.

By 2014, the organization had more than 40 staff attorneys, and had "emerged as the largest legal force of the religious right, arguing hundreds of pro bono cases across the country." ADF garnered national attention in the 2012 Burwell v. Hobby Lobby Stores, Inc. case as well as its 2014 challenge to the Affordable Care Act.

=== Leadership and international expansion ===
The ADF's first president, CEO and Chief Counsel was Alan Sears, who was also a founder of the organization. Sears has been described as "an ardent antipornography crusader", and had previously served as staff executive director of the Reagan administration Attorney General's Commission on Pornography, which produced the 1986 Meese Report.

Sears led the organization for over 20 years, until 2017. From 2017 to 2022, Michael Farris, the founder of Patrick Henry College, was CEO of ADF. Farris lobbied Congress for the passage of the Religious Freedom Restoration Act of 1993. He has been closely associated with the Christian homeschooling movement since the 1980s and is the founder of the Christian organization Home School Legal Defense Association, which offers legal representation to home-schooling parents. In 2016, Farris voiced opposition to Donald Trump's candidacy for president, opining that "Trump most clearly fails the traditional standard championed by the Christian right on the subject of personal character." However, after Trump refused to concede the 2020 presidential election and made false claims of voter fraud, Farris worked to overturn the election results, drafting a legal complaint with Texas Attorney General Ken Paxton in the unsuccessful case Texas v. Pennsylvania.

On October 1, 2022, Kristen Waggoner succeeded Farris as CEO and President of ADF, retaining her role as General Counsel.

=== ADF International ===
Since 2010, ADF's global arm, ADF International, has been increasingly active around the world. In 2015, ADF International stated that it had been involved in "over 500 cases before national and international tribunals," in the United States of America, Argentina, Honduras, India, Mexico, Peru, the European Union Court and the Inter-American Court of Human Rights. The organization reported 580 "ongoing legal matters" in fifty-one countries as of 2017, and had a budget of $11.5 million worldwide in 2020–2021. The organization established an affiliate group in India (ADF India) in 2012, headquartered in Delhi. In addition, ADF is incorporated in a number of European countries under "ADF International": Belgium, Germany (as ADF International Deutschland), France, Switzerland, the United Kingdom, and Austria (as ADF International Austria GmbH). The organization also lobbies the European Union Parliament via ADF International Belgium, which participates in the intergroup organization "Freedom of Religion and Religious Tolerance." As part of EU advocacy, its members have presented on issues including Christian minority persecution in Iraq and Myanmar.

ADF International's budget was US$11.5 million (€9,489,000) in FY 2020–21. In the EU, the organization spent about $9.8 million (€8.7 million) from 2008 to 2016. In 2020, it reported a budget of about $2 million per year (£1.5 million), including approximately $430,000 on lobbying EU officials. Its registered EU lobbying group, ADF International Belgium, had five employees and a $585,000 budget for the 2022-23 financial year. In its financial disclosure information, ADF International Belgium lists its source as a donation from Alliance Defending Freedom.

=== Finances and donors ===
The Servant Foundation donated over $50,000,000 to the Alliance Defending Freedom between 2018 and 2020, via the foundation's financial arm, The Signatry. The most public use of these funds has been the "He Gets Us" campaign during Super Bowl commercial breaks. Other donors include: the Green family, the Covenant Foundation, the Bolthouse Foundation, the Edgar and Elsa Prince Foundation, the Richard and Helen DeVos Foundation, the Bradley Foundation, and the Charles Koch Institute. The M.J. Murdock Charitable Trust, one of largest charities in the Pacific Northwest, donated nearly $1,000,000 to ADF from 2007 to 2016.

== Supreme Court ==
ADF attorneys have argued, and won, a number of cases before the Supreme Court.

=== Free speech ===
The 2023 case 303 Creative LLC v. Elenis addressed an intersection between the Free Speech Clause of the First Amendment to the United States Constitution and LGBTQ rights. It pitched Lorie Smith, a graphic designer represented by ADF's Kristen Waggoner, against a Colorado public accommodations law that she feared would have compelled her to also create expression about same-sex marriages that contradicted her religious beliefs if she designed websites celebrating marriages between men and women. In a 6–3 decision, the Supreme Court ruled that the First Amendment forbade the state of Colorado from compelling speech that contradicted her beliefs.

The 2018 case National Institute of Family and Life Advocates v. Becerra addressed the issue of Free Speech and abortion. At issue was California's Reproductive FACT (Freedom, Accountability, Comprehensive Care, and Transparency) Act that compelled pro-life pregnancy care centers, represented by ADF's Michael Farris, to post information in their waiting rooms saying that California provides free or low-cost abortion, as well as providing a number to call for abortion referrals. The Supreme Court ruled 5-4 that requiring those notices was a free speech violation.

The 2001 case Good News Club v. Milford Central School concerned a public school's exclusion of a club from using the school building after hours based solely on the club's religious nature. The Supreme Court ruled 6-3 that the Good News Club, represented by ADF's senior counsel Thomas Marcelle, was the victim of impermissible viewpoint discrimination and that religious clubs must be afforded equal access to use public school facilities.

=== Abortion ===
The 2022 case Dobbs v. Jackson Women's Health Organization, considered the constitutionality of a Mississippi law that placed a ban on abortions after 15 weeks, in conflict with Roe v. Wade (1973) and Planned Parenthood v. Casey (1992). The Mississippi law was based on ADF's model legislation, specifically designed to provoke a legal challenge that could then be appealed up to the Supreme Court. ADF lawyers then served on the Mississippi Attorney General's legal team to defend the ban. The strategy succeeded: the Justices voted to overturn Roe v Wade, and Casey, and to return the power to regulate abortion to the States.

=== Gender ===
The 2026 case Little v. Hecox addressed Idaho's "Fairness in Women's Sports Act". The law was the first categorical ban on transgender women and girls participating in women's sports teams in the United States. The ADF represented student athletes Madison Kenyon and Mary Marshall while arguing in support of the ban. "We want to ensure that we protect women based on their sex, so that they have those opportunities Title IX was designed to provide them," said ADF lawyer Christiana Holcomb.

=== Allegations of falsified evidence ===
In multiple cases ADF has argued before the Supreme Court, there have been allegations of inaccurate, misleading or falsified evidence after investigative reporting has contested its authenticity.

Ethical and legal issues were raised in the 303 Creative LLC v. Elenis case about the legitimacy of the Supreme Court after it ruled in favor of a website designer who did not want to provide services to a gay couple. ADF represented the plaintiff which misrepresented a gay couple that did not exist. The 2023 ruling was considered controversial and received criticism from prominent legal theorists and law reviews.

In 2025, The Guardian reported that ADF "profoundly" misrepresented its research on the "psychological damage" of conversion therapy and manufactured claims in the Chiles v. Salazar case. Chiles claimed that her free speech rights were infringed upon by Colorado's conversion therapy ban and she had "begun censoring herself in conversations with clients". The state's attorneys did not find an official complaint filed, rather a "pre-enforcement challenge" three years after the ban had passed.

== Litigation positions ==
ADF's positions include supporting the place of religion in public institutions, opposing LGBTQ rights, opposing abortion and contraception, and other positions aligned with conservative Christianity in the United States.

Issue advocacy as a function of press releases (2017)
1. Religious liberty (45.0%)
2. Opposition to abortion (22.0%)
3. Opposition to same-sex marriage (21.0%)
4. Not specified (12.0%)

=== Religion in public institutions ===
According to materials for its donors, ADF seeks to spread a belief in "the framers' original intent for the US Constitution and the Bill of Rights as it reflects God's natural law and God's higher law." Before taking the oath of office as Speaker of the House of Representatives, current, former ADF lawyer Mike Johnson stated, "The Bible is very clear that God is the one that raises up those in authority ... each of you, all of us." The organization pursues "strategies for reclaiming the judicial system as it was originally envisioned," most notably through litigation.

The ADF has been involved in several United States Supreme Court cases that would permit equal access to public buildings and public funds for religious organisations, such as Rosenberger v. University of Virginia (1995) and Good News Club v. Milford Central School (2001). ADF also supported allowing prayer at the start of monthly public town meetings (see Town of Greece v. Galloway) and the use of religious displays (such as crosses and other religious monuments) in public buildings and on public lands.

==== Parental rights regarding sex education in schools ====
ADF has argued that parents who object to sex education on religious grounds should have the right to opt not to have their children attend.

==== Christian-only adoption ====
In 2022, ADF took on a case defending a Tennessee-based Christian adoption agency that refused to work with Jewish prospective parents. The case, which names the State of Tennessee as a defendant for its law permitting religious organizations to reject applicants based on faith, was dismissed on technical grounds. The case was appealed to the Tennessee Court of Appeals, which reversed the trial-court panel's decision on August 24, 2023, agreeing that the prospective parents and all the other plaintiffs have the right to bring the lawsuit. The Tennessee Department of Children's Services then filed an application seeking review of the case by the Tennessee Supreme Court, which the court denied on May 16, 2024.

Commenting on an earlier case in South Carolina, an ADF spokesperson expressed support for an evangelical foster care provider in South Carolina that rejects Jewish prospective parents, as well as LGBTQ people, atheists, and other non-Christians. The agency, Miracle Hill Ministries, is the largest foster and adoption agency in South Carolina and receives public funding; its president has stated that its religious discrimination policy is justified, because "We look like a social service agency, but we're a community of Christ followers and our faith in Christ is the most important part of who we are." A Catholic woman sued the agency after being rejected on the basis of religion, but the agency later changed its rules to permit "Catholics who affirm Miracle Hill's doctrinal statement in belief and practice to serve as foster parents and employees."

At the request of South Carolina governor Henry McMaster, the Trump administration granted the organization a waiver of federal non-discrimination law. An ADF spokesperson indicated that the organization is "grateful [to] HHS and South Carolina" for granting the waiver, which allows the agency to continue to restrict fostering and adoption work to those who endorse evangelical beliefs.

=== Opposing LGBTQ rights ===
In 2003, ADF unsuccessfully called for the recriminalization of homosexual acts in the U.S. (prior to 1962, sodomy had been a felony in every U.S. state), filing a Supreme Court brief supporting Texas' sodomy law in the landmark Lawrence v. Texas case which declared sodomy laws unconstitutional; it linked homosexuality to pedophilia. ADF also opposes same-sex marriage and civil unions, as well as adoption by same-sex couples, based on its leaders' "belief that God created men, women, and families such that children thrive best in homes with a married mother and father." ADF provided legal support to the defendants in two Supreme Court cases dealing with the intersection of freedom of religion against Colorado's anti-discrimination laws for public-serving businesses, Masterpiece Cakeshop v. Colorado Civil Rights Commission (2018) and 303 Creative LLC v. Elenis (2022); in both cases, the underlying issue was whether Christian business owners, under the anti-discrimination law, were compelled to create works with LGBT messaging that they said went against their Christian faith. In 2021, the Supreme Court declined to consider an appeal from ADF attorneys on behalf of a florist who refused to serve her clients' same-sex wedding, with three of the nine justices indicating they were willing to hear the case.

The organization has worked internationally to prevent decriminalization of homosexuality in Jamaica and Belize. The SPLC has reported on ADF support for a law criminalizing same-sex sexual acts in Belize (ruled unconstitutional in 2016). The ADF denied playing any role in the case. In the United Kingdom, ADF International advocated in favor of a mother's custody of her child, against the custody of the child's father and his same-sex partner. ADF also has links to the former prime minister of Australia, Tony Abbott, an outspoken opponent of the legalization of same-sex marriage in Australia. Abbott gave a speech to ADF regarding marriage in 2016.

ADF opposes transgender rights based on the idea that "God creates each person with an immutable biological sex—male or female..." The organization has litigated against transgender employment protections, access to bathrooms, and participation in sports for transgender people. Members of ADF also authored model legislation for bathroom bills in the United States, aimed at restricting transgender people's use of single-sex public bathrooms. In 2020, the ADF lost a Supreme Court case in which ADF attorneys defended a funeral home that fired a trans employee in the Supreme Court case, R.G. & G.R. Harris Funeral Homes Inc. v. Equal Employment Opportunity Commission, losing in a 6–3 vote.

The organization has worked to prevent transgender athletes from competing in sex-segregated sports on the basis of their gender identity, through lawsuits and by lobbying state legislatures. In April 2022, ADF-affiliated lawyers defended a professor at Shawnee State University, Ohio, who refused to use preferred pronouns when referring to a transgender student; the university agreed to a $400,000 settlement with the professor.

In Europe, ADF International has supported mandatory genital surgery (and consequent sterilization) of transgender people before they are allowed to change the gender marker on government IDs. However, a decision by the European Court of Human Rights, A.P., Garçon and Nicot v. France, has led France, Greece, Portugal, and several other countries to allow non-medical pathways to gender marker change.

In June 2022, several groups opposing trans rights, including Alliance Defending Freedom, WDI USA, Family Research Council and Women's Liberation Front, organized a rally in Washington D.C. supporting single-sex athletic competition.

In June 2023, the Supreme Court of the United States ruled in favor of the plaintiff, represented by ADF, for the 303 Creative LLC v. Elenis case. The ruling sparked widespread criticism regarding whether the plaintiff lacked standing. These criticisms prompted several articles myth-busting the attackers on the plaintiff's standing.

=== Opposing abortion, birth control, and euthanasia ===
ADF has long opposed abortion, and has litigated to restrict access to abortion and contraception in the US and in other countries. The ADF was a key participant in the 2022 case, Dobbs v. Jackson Women's Health Organization, that ended the right to an abortion in the first 24 weeks throughout the U.S. and returned the power to regulate abortion to each State. The ADF represents the Alliance for Hippocratic Medicine in Alliance for Hippocratic Medicine v. US Food and Drug Administration, a case where the plaintiff has challenged the U.S Food and Drug Agency's longstanding approval of mifepristone, a drug frequently used in medical abortion procedures.

One of its most notable legal battles was a 2014 case challenging the Affordable Care Act. In Burwell v. Hobby Lobby Stores, Inc., the Court ruled that the birth control mandate in employee-funded health plans when the company is "closely-held" violated the Religious Freedom Restoration Act of 1993. The case set a precedent for allowing corporations and individuals to make religious claims for exemption from laws and regulations based on a religious freedom argument. The United States Supreme Court held that privately held corporations could be exempt from Affordable Care Act regulations if the owners asserted religiously objections, basing the decision on the Religious Freedom Restoration Act of 1993. The decision meant that many employers could decide not to cover contraceptives through their health insurance plans.

In 2014, lawyers from the organization represented parents who wanted public schools to remove pages from a biology textbook that mentioned abortion and sexually transmitted diseases.

==== International anti-abortion work ====
ADF has led an international campaign to influence and restrict the right to abortion. The organization takes the position that healthcare workers have a right to refuse to provide care for abortion and other practices the individual finds morally objectionable. ADF has backed anti-abortion causes in Ireland, El Salvador, Colombia, Poland and Sweden. In the United Kingdom, the group has campaigned against buffer zones around abortion clinics.

In Sweden, a midwife, Ellinor Grimmark, sued the province of Jönköping for discrimination because she was refused employment when, citing "freedom of conscience", she refused to give morning-after pills, perform abortions, or put in copper IUDs. She lost both her hearing before the Discrimination Ombudsman, and at the Jönköping district court. The proceedings in the Labor Court of Sweden began on January 24, 2017, and her case received both legal and financial aid from ADF. Grimmark's legal representative, Ruth Nordström, was a registered partner of ADF, and both Grimmark and Nordström participated in ADFs marketing films. Nordström co-wrote an opinion piece opposing abortion rights with an ADF representative for Sveriges Television, Sweden's national public television broadcaster.

==== Campaigns against assisted suicide ====
The ADF has campaigned against the legalization of voluntary euthanasia in the United Kingdom. The group has also challenged the right to euthanasia in Belgium, before the European Court of Human Rights. ADF India also campaigns against assisted suicide and euthanasia.

=== COVID-19 restriction cases ===
ADF has opposed government measures aimed at stopping the spread of COVID-19 in the United States and in other countries. In the US, ADF partnered with The Daily Wire in a legal challenge against the Biden administration's OSHA vaccine mandate. In Uganda, ADF joined a Texas libertarian organization in backing a campaign to end restrictions on large gatherings that the government had implemented to reduce COVID-19 spread. ADF brought legal challenges against the Ugandan government's regulations on large gatherings. In Scotland, ADF fought against COVID-19 regulations on large gatherings, claiming that the measures were unfair to religious groups. The ADF-backed lawsuit won in Scotland's high court. A poll commissioned by the Humanist Society showed that more than three-quarters of Scots were opposed to the church's reopening and the Church of Scotland distanced itself from the legal action, saying that they accepted measures to prevent COVID-19 spread.

=== Non-profit donor disclosure ===
In the US Supreme Court decision Americans for Prosperity Foundation v. Bonta (2021), ADF argued that non-profits should not be required to disclose the identities of their donors on California state tax returns. Donors who gave more than $5,000 or 2% of the total donations to a non-profit in a year were to be named on the state returns. In a victory for ADF, the court struck down the disclosure law as unconstitutional.

== Other activities ==
=== Blackstone Legal Fellowship ===
Blackstone Legal Fellowship, named after the English jurist William Blackstone, is ADF's summer legal training program. It was founded in 2000 for the purpose of preparing Christian law students for professional legal careers. The first class comprised 24 interns. The program is made up of interns, called Fellows, from a diverse selection of law schools as well as elite institutions such as Harvard and Yale. Amy Coney Barrett, who went on to be Associate Justice of the Supreme Court of the United States, was a paid speaker at Blackstone on five occasions between 2013 and 2017.

=== Public campaigns ===
In 2003 the ADF launched the "Christmas Project", aiming to discourage non-Christian holidays from being celebrated and to promote Christmas celebrations in public schools. The annual initiative was organized in an effort to prevent school districts from holding secular holiday celebrations, or what the organization called the "censorship of Christmas". In its press release ADF singled out the American Civil Liberties Union as the chief target of the campaign. By 2004, the organization had contacted 3,600 school districts to inform them that they were not required by the Constitution to have holiday celebrations inclusive of all religions.

In 2005 the ADF and Focus on the Family began sponsoring a counter-protest called the Day of Truth (later called "Day of Dialogue") to oppose the annual Day of Silence, an annual event to promote awareness of anti-LGBT bullying and harassment in schools. The ADF asserted that 1,100 students from 350 schools participated in ADF's event, which ADF billed as a response to the "homosexual agenda".

=== Church political activity and tax exemption ===
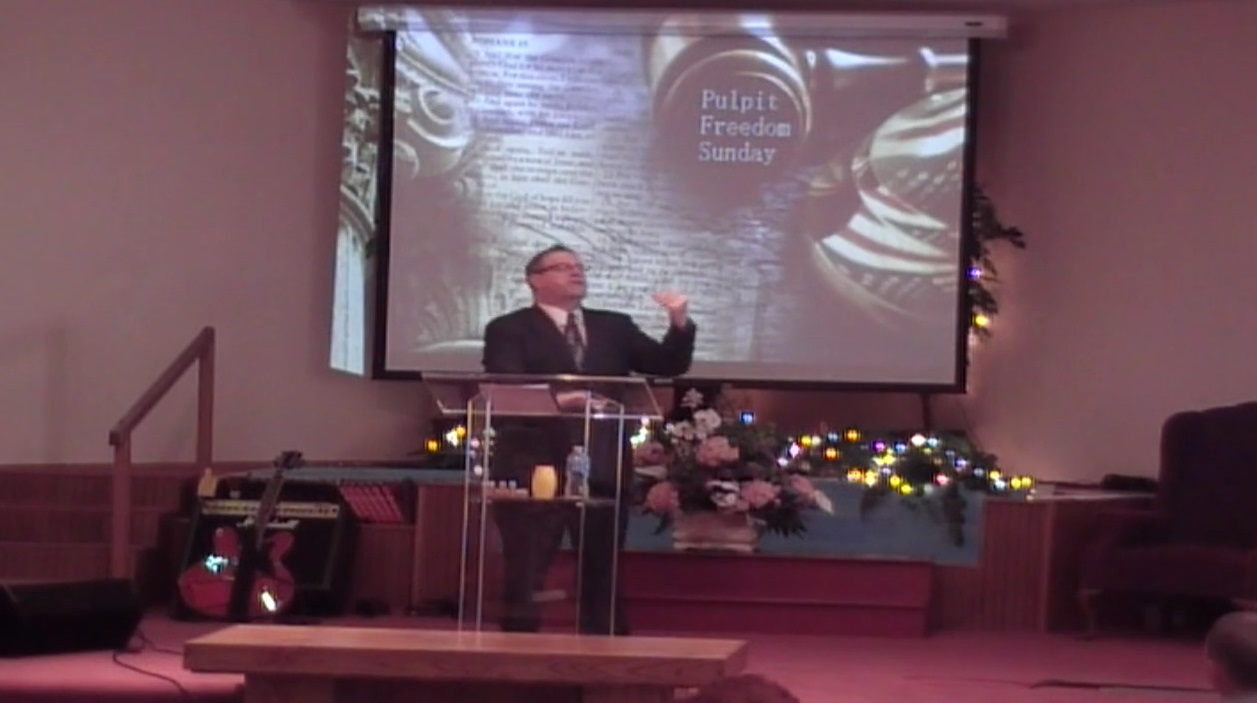
Pulpit Freedom Sunday in 2011

In 2008, ADF launched the first Pulpit Freedom Sunday to promote political messaging and endorsements in Christian pastors' sermons in defiance of the prohibition on political endorsements by non-profit 501(c)(3) organizations under the 1954 Johnson Amendment. The practice of political endorsement is not broadly accepted within the evangelical community, with most Evangelical pastors opposed as of 2017.

Pulpit Freedom Sunday is an initiative aimed to overturn the Johnson Amendment, which restricts political campaigning by tax-exempt non-profit organizations, which includes most churches. According to The New York Times, ADF's campaign is "perhaps its most aggressive effort." In the first year about 35 pastors participated, in what they consider an act of civil disobedience, endorsing political candidates in their sermons and defying the Internal Revenue Service regulations. In Minnesota, Reverend Gus Booth encouraged his congregation to vote for John McCain rather than Barack Obama. As of 2014, participation in the event had grown to about 1,800 pastors. The IRS indicated that it would increase enforcement of the Johnson Amendment.

== Reception ==
Principal concerns of the ADF have been prohibiting abortion and opposing gay rights. Several founding members wrote books condemning homosexuality, including longtime president Alan Sears, who authored the 2003 book The Homosexual Agenda, and Marlin Malloux, who wrote 1994's Answers to the Gay Deception. D. James Kennedy dismissed same-sex marriage as "counterfeit" and promoted pseudoscientific conversion therapy, which helped launch a ministry aiming to help gay people "overcome" homosexuality.

In July 2017, U.S. sitting Attorney General Jeff Sessions attended ADF's Summit on Religious Liberty. LGBTQ rights groups criticized Sessions for his participation at the event. Dominic Holden wrote in BuzzFeed News that ADF's growing influence within the federal government can be attributed to Sessions' support.

The Nation, a progressive monthly magazine, describes ADF as a vanguard evangelical Christian legal advocacy group. After the Supreme Court overturned Roe v. Wade, Politico and The New York Times Magazine identified ADF as being a prominent organization for battling conservative legal causes. The year following the ruling, the group's UK division reported an increase in expenditures of £220,751, totalling £993,118, and has been expanding their lobbying efforts amongst members of the UK Parliament.

The Southern Poverty Law Center listed the organization as an anti-LGBTQ hate group in 2016. The group's designation "was a judgment call that went all the way up to top leadership at the SPLC." According to the SPLC, the ADF was included on the list due to the group's filing of an amicus brief in the 2003 U.S. Supreme Court case Lawrence v. Texas, in which the ADF expressed support for upholding the state's right to criminalize consensual sexual acts between people of the same sex. The SPLC has described the ADF as "virulently anti-gay". The SPLC describes the group's mission as "making life as difficult as possible for LGBT communities in the U.S. and internationally." The ADF has opposed its inclusion on the SPLC's list. Farris has called the SPLC's designation of ADF as a hate group a "troubling smear" and "slander".

In regards to anti-trans legislation efforts made by ADF, organizations such as GLAAD and the Human Rights Campaign (HRC) have claimed that ADF works with other extremist groups to oppress marginalized people. In 2022, ADF authored at least 130 bills in 34 states; more than 30 were passed into law.

Some opponents of the Pulpit Freedom Sunday movement have voiced concern about permitting churches to endorse politicians because it would allow political donors to remain anonymous and to get tax breaks for their donations. Unlike other non-profits, churches are not required to make financial disclosures, so churches endorsing politicians could act as funnels for anonymous campaign donations, or "dark money".

== Associated people ==
The following people are currently or have been affiliated or associated with ADF:

- Tony Abbott, former prime minister of Australia
- William Barr, former US Attorney General under George H. W. Bush and Donald Trump, ADF Award recipient in 2021
- Amy Coney Barrett, Associate Justice of the U.S. Supreme Court, previously taught constitutional law at Blackstone Legal Fellowship
- Bill Bright, founder of Campus Crusade for Christ and ADF
- J. Budziszewski, professor, member of advisory board of Blackstone
- Larry Burkett, founder of Crown Financial Ministries and ADF
- Paul Coleman, executive director of ADF International
- Chapman B. Cox, former General Counsel of the United States Department of Defense, ADF chairman emeritus
- Marjorie Dannenfelser, president of the Susan B. Anthony List and member of ADF Board
- James Dobson, founder of Focus on the Family and ADF
- Kyle Duncan, judge appointed by Trump to the Fifth Circuit Court of Appeals, speaker for ADF in 2007, 2008, and 2009
- Michael Farris, president and CEO from 2017 to 2022
- David A. French, New York Times columnist, former Senior Counsel at ADF, formerly a journalist at National Review and The Dispatch
- Robert P. George, legal scholar, member of Blackstone Advisory Board
- Mary Ann Glendon, former U. S. Ambassador to the Holy See, member of Blackstone Advisory Board
- Erin Hawley, ADF senior counsel (spouse of Senator Josh Hawley)
- Josh Hawley, U.S. Senator for Missouri, former member of Blackstone Fellowship (spouse of Erin Hawley)
- Mike Johnson, former ADF attorney, Speaker of the U.S. House of Representatives (Representative of Louisiana)
- Michael J. Juneau, judge of the U.S. District Court, Western District of Louisiana
- D. James Kennedy, founder of Coral Ridge Ministries and ADF
- Charles LiMandri, attorney associated with the Mount Soledad Cross lawsuits
- Marlin Maddoux, president, International Christian Media and ADF founder
- Edwin Meese, former Attorney General of the United States, member of Blackstone Advisory Board
- Mike Pence, former Vice President of the United States; appointed former ADF President Michael Farris to his Advancing American Freedom Advisory Board
- William Pew, co-founder of ADF
- Charles W. Pickering, former judge for the Fifth Circuit Court of Appeals, ADF Board member
- Charles E. Rice, legal scholar, member of Blackstone Advisory Board
- Allison Jones Rushing, judge of the Fourth Circuit Court of Appeals
- Andrew Sandlin, Christian minister, faculty member at Blackstone
- Alan Seabaugh, member of Louisiana legislature, ADF-allied attorney
- Alan Sears, attorney, and founder and first president and CEO of ADF
- Jeff Sessions, former U.S. Attorney General under Donald Trump and U.S. Senator for Alabama
- Brantley Starr, United States district judge of the United States District Court for the Northern District of Texas.
- Ken Starr, judge and independent counsel in Clinton impeachment, member of ADF's Supreme Court Advisory Council
- Lawrence VanDyke, federal judge for the Ninth Circuit, former ADF legal intern and law student training panelist
- Kristen Waggoner, ADF President and CEO as of 2022
- Doug Wardlow, former Minnesota legislator, former lawyer at ADF

== See also ==
- Alliance for Therapeutic Choice and Scientific Integrity
- American Center for Law and Justice
- American Family Association
- Americans United for Life
- Becket Law
- Center for Individual Rights
- Christian Legal Society
- Ethics & Religious Liberty Commission
- Family Policy Council
- Federalist Society
- First Liberty Institute
- The Heritage Foundation
- Liberty Counsel
- Liberty University
- List of court cases involving Alliance Defending Freedom
- National Association of Evangelicals
- National Organization for Marriage
- National Right to Life Committee
- Operation Rescue
- Pacific Justice Institute
- Regent University
- Thomas More Society
