= Charles E. Rice =

American legal scholar and author (1931–2015)

Vice Chair of the Conservative Party of New York
- In office 1962–1969
- Preceded by: Position established
- Succeeded by: Kiernan O'Doherty

Personal details
- Born: Charles Edward Rice; August 7, 1931 New York City, U.S.
- Died: February 25, 2015 (aged 83)
- Children: 10
- Education: College of the Holy Cross (BA); Boston College (JD); New York University (LLM, JSD)

Military service
- Branch/service: United States Marine Corps
- Rank: Lieutenant Colonel (reserves)

Charles Edward Rice (August 7, 1931 – February 25, 2015) was an American legal scholar. He was a professor of law at the University of Notre Dame, where he taught at Notre Dame Law School from 1969 to 2014. He was the co-editor of the American Journal of Jurisprudence from 1970 to 1996.

== Early life and education ==
Rice was born in New York City on August 7, 1931. He was of Irish descent. His father was active in Irish-American and Catholic organizations in New York.

Rice graduated from the College of the Holy Cross with a Bachelor of Arts in philosophy 1953. As an undergraduate at Holy Cross, he was a member of the college's AFROTC and wrote a senior thesis titled, "The Ethics of Kant". He earned his Juris Doctor (JD) from Boston College Law School in 1956, then a Master of Laws (LLM) in 1959 and Doctor of Juridical Science (JSD) in 1962 from New York University. His doctoral dissertation was titled, "Freedom of association".

== Career ==
He practiced law in New York City and taught at New York University Law School and Fordham Law School before joining, in 1969, the faculty of law at Notre Dame.

He was instrumental in the founding of the Conservative Party of New York in the 1960s. He served as vice-chairman of the party from 1962 to 1969.

Rice served in the Marine Corps and was a retired lieutenant colonel who served in the Marine Corps Reserve.

From 1981 to 1993, Rice was a member of the Education Appeal Board of the United States Department of Education. He also served as a consultant to the United States Commission on Civil Rights and to various Congressional committees on constitutional issues and was an editor of the American Journal of Jurisprudence. He was a member of the governing boards of Franciscan University of Steubenville and the Eternal Word Television Network. He served as chairman of the Center for Law and Justice International in New Hope, Kentucky, and a director of the Thomas More Law Center in Ann Arbor. He was an assistant coach of the Notre Dame Boxing Club.

Rice was one of the co-founders of Ave Maria School of Law in Ann Arbor, Michigan. He is also a board member of Blackstone Fellowship the Christian conservative legal training program run by Alliance Defending Freedom.

== Personal life ==
He lived with his wife, Mary E. Rice, in Mishawaka, Indiana. They had 10 biological children and 41 grandchildren, and adopted a son from South Vietnam.

== Publications ==
=== Video lectures ===
Rice made several video lectures on Natural Law Theory and other topics, including The Good Code for EWTN, Right Reason with Dr. Charles Rice alongside Michael Voris for Church Militant.tv, and Natural Law: What It Is and Why We Need It for International Catholic University.

=== Books ===
- Rice, Charles E., Bormes, Alyssa (2014). Contraception and Persecution. St. Augustines Press. ISBN 978-1-58731-1550.
- Rice, Charles E. (2009). What Happened to Notre Dame?. St. Augustines Press.
- Rice, Charles E. (2006). The Winning Side: Why the Culture of Death is Dying. St. Augustine. ISBN 1-58731-923-3.
- Rice, Charles E. (2005). Where Did I Come From? Where Am I Going? How Do I Get There?: Straight Answers for Young Catholics. St. Augustine. ISBN 1-58731-927-6.
- Rice, Charles E. (1999). The Winning Side: Questions on Living the Culture of Life. E M R. ISBN 0-9674691-0-4.
- Rice, Charles E. (1999). 50 Questions on the Natural Law: What It Is and Why We Need It. Ignatius. ISBN 0-89870-750-1.
- Rice, Charles E. (1990). No Exception: A Pro-Life Imperative. Human Life International. ISBN 0-9627667-0-4.
- Rice, Charles E. (1986). 50 Questions on Abortion, Euthanasia and Related Issues. Cashel Institute. ASIN B00071M82K.
- Rice, Charles E. (1985). Divided Ireland: A Cause for American Concern. Tyholland Press. ASIN B0006YVFCC.
- Rice, Charles E. (1983). Truth in Christ. Cashel Institute. ISBN 99914-3-946-3.
- Rice, Charles E. (1978). Beyond Abortion: The Theory and Practice of the Secular State. Franciscan Press. ISBN 0-8199-0696-4.
- Rice, Charles E. (1971). Authority and Rebellion: The Case for Orthodoxy in the Catholic Church. Doubleday. ASIN B0006C5HEQ.
- Rice, Charles E. (1969). The Vanishing Right to Live: An Appeal for a Renewed Reverence for Life. Doubleday. ASIN B0006BYNYC.
- Rice, Charles E. (1964). The Supreme Court and Public Prayer. Fordham University Press. ASIN B000J31U0C.
- Rice, Charles E. (1962). Freedom of Association. New York University Press. ISBN 0-8147-0360-7.

=== Columns ===
Rice was a regular columnist for The Irish Rover, a student-run newspaper serving the University of Notre Dame campus.
