= Kelvin J. Cochran =

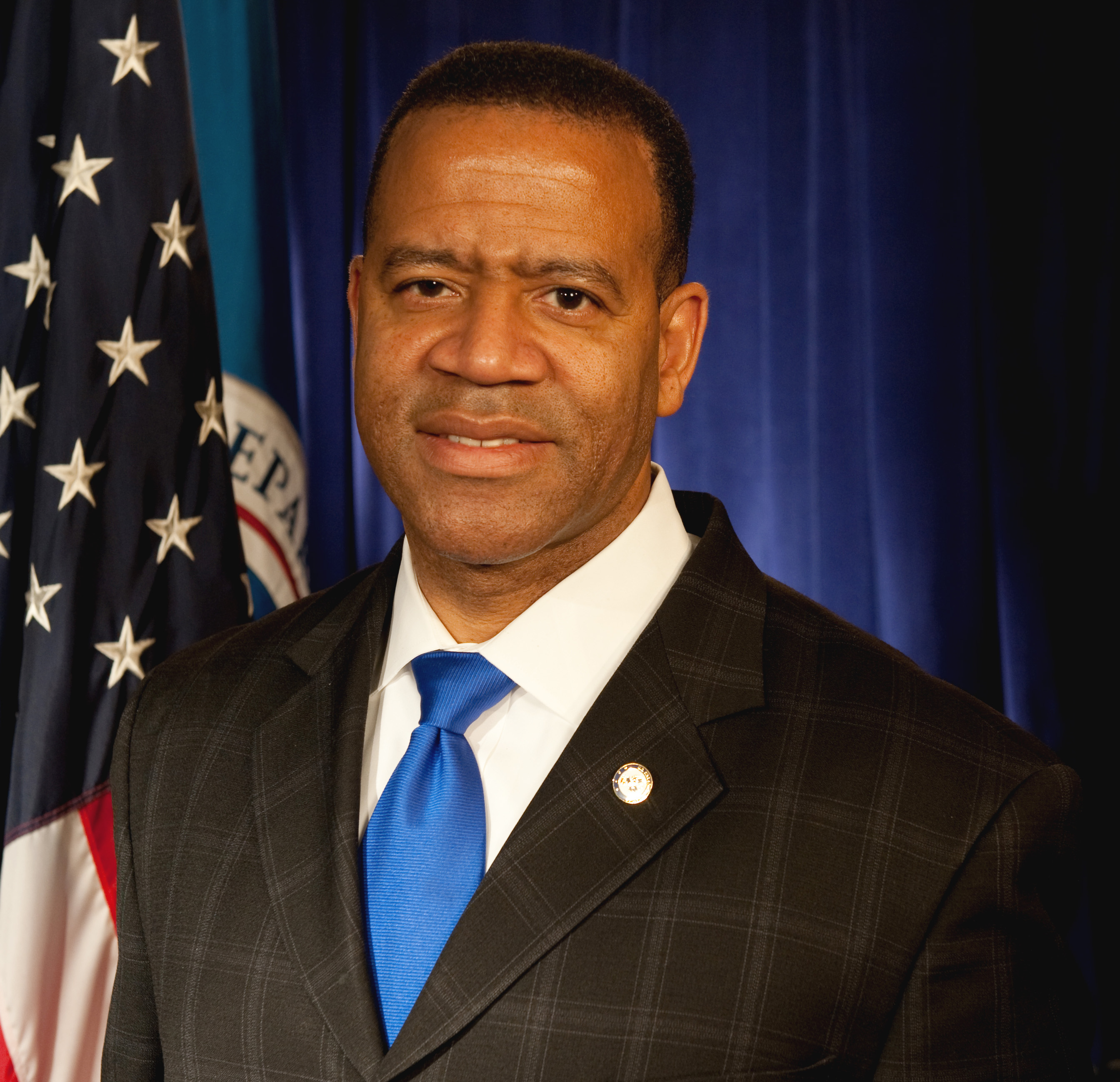

U.S. Fire Administrator
- In office January 1, 2009 – May 8, 2010
- Preceded by: Gregory B. Cade
- Succeeded by: Glenn A. Gaines

Fire Chief, Atlanta Fire Department, Atlanta, Georgia
- In office August 16, 2010 – January 6, 2015
- Preceded by: Joel G. Baker
- Succeeded by: Joel G. Baker (named Interim Chief)

Personal details
- Born: January 23, 1960 (age 66) Shreveport, Louisiana
- Occupation: Fire chief; author

Kelvin J. Cochran (born January 23, 1960) is an author, public speaker, former administrator of the United States Fire Administration, and former Fire Chief of Atlanta Fire Department. He was fired from the Atlanta fire department after he wrote a book for members of his church expressing conservative views on sexuality, adultery, and homosexuality.

== Early life ==
Cochran was first hired by Shreveport Fire Department in 1981 serving as a trainer and assistant fire chief. Mayor Keith Hightower later appointed him the first African-American fire chief of Shreveport, Louisiana August 26, 1999. He helped the New Orleans Fire Department in 2005 in response to Hurricane Katrina and went on to serve positions in the International Association of Fire Chiefs (IAFC) from 2006 to 2007.

He worked under mayor Kasim Reed starting January 2, 2008, for Atlanta Fire Department, prior to being appointed US Fire Administrator in July 2009 by President Barack Obama where he worked extensively with the Federal Emergency Management Agency and the United States Department of Homeland Security to prevent fires and improve fire response. He maintained this role until returning to Atlanta on May 8, 2010, and being re-appointed as Fire Chief of Atlanta Fire Department August 16, 2010.

== Suspension and firing ==
Cochran was suspended for 30 days without pay starting November 24, 2014, for distributing to employees a book he had written, Who Told You That You Were Naked?, which expressed Cochran's religious views which included calling homosexuality and lesbianism a perversion and which mayor Kasim Reed considered to be discriminatory against LGBT people. On January 6, 2015, after returning from the suspension, he was informed that he would have to resign or be terminated.

A rally was held in Atlanta on January 13 in support of Cochran, with various leaders of faith attending including Bishop Wellington Boone, president of the Fellowship of International Churches.

Deputy Chief Joel Baker has replaced Cochran as the active fire chief of Atlanta Fire Department.

On February 18, 2015, a lawsuit was filed in the U.S. District Court for the Northern District of Georgia, Atlanta Division, and heard by Judge Leigh Martin May. The suit, brought by Cochran and represented by Alliance Defending Freedom—a legal advocacy group known for religious liberty cases—alleged racial discrimination by the City of Atlanta.

A petition to dismiss the case was filed on March 25 but was denied by Judge May. On October 14, she indicated a ruling was forthcoming. On December 16, 2015, Judge May ruled that the lawsuit could proceed.

== $1.2 million payout by City of Atlanta ==
On December 20, 2017, Judge May upheld his firing and also ruled that as an "at-will" employee, his firing was legal. However, the judge noted that "rules cited in Cochran’s dismissal that require city employees to get pre-clearance for outside employment could stifle speech unconstitutionally and also failed to define the standards to be used when judging a potential conflict of interest." Later, the City of Atlanta agreed to settle saying they’d, "conducted an extensive review of the facts and the law and concluded that the cost of continuing to defend against the lawsuit would far exceed the cost to settle.” The $1.2 million includes a settlement and attorneys’ fees.

== Bibliography ==
- Who Told You That You Were Naked? Paperback, ISBN 978-0985496852

== See also ==
- Atlanta Fire Department
- Lists of African Americans
