= Masterpiece Cakeshop v. Colorado Civil Rights Commission =

2018 U.S. Supreme Court case on free expression

- Supreme Court of the United States

Argued December 5, 2017 Decided June 4, 2018
- Full case name: Masterpiece Cakeshop, Ltd., et al., Petitioners v. Colorado Civil Rights Commission, et al.
- Docket no.: 16-111
- Citations: 584 U.S. 617 (2018) (more) 138 S. Ct. 1719; 201 L. Ed. 2d 35
- Decision: Opinion

Case history
- Prior: Judgment for plaintiff, Craig v. Masterpiece Cakeshop, Inc., 2015 COA 115, 370 P.3d 272 (2015); cert. granted, 137 S. Ct. 2290 (2017).

Holding
- By failing to act in a manner neutral to religion, the Colorado Civil Rights Commission violated the First Amendment to the United States Constitution.

Court membership
- Chief Justice John Roberts Associate Justices Anthony Kennedy · Clarence Thomas; Ruth Bader Ginsburg · Stephen Breyer; Samuel Alito · Sonia Sotomayor; Elena Kagan · Neil Gorsuch

Case opinions
- Majority: Kennedy, joined by Roberts, Breyer, Alito, Kagan, Gorsuch
- Concurrence: Kagan, joined by Breyer
- Concurrence: Gorsuch, joined by Alito
- Concurrence: Thomas (in part and in judgment), joined by Gorsuch
- Dissent: Ginsburg, joined by Sotomayor

Laws applied
- U.S. Const. amend. I

Masterpiece Cakeshop v. Colorado Civil Rights Commission, 584 U.S. 617 (2018), was a case in the Supreme Court of the United States that addressed whether owners of public accommodations can refuse certain services based on the First Amendment claims of free speech and free exercise of religion, and therefore be granted an exemption from laws ensuring non-discrimination in public accommodations—in particular, by refusing to provide creative services, such as making a custom wedding cake for the marriage of a gay couple, on the basis of the owner's religious beliefs.

The case dealt with Masterpiece Cakeshop, a bakery in Lakewood, Colorado, which refused to design a custom wedding cake for a gay couple based on the owner's religious beliefs. The Colorado Civil Rights Commission evaluated the case under the state's anti-discrimination law, the Colorado Anti-Discrimination Act. The commission found that the bakery had discriminated against the couple and issued specific orders for the bakery. Following appeals within the state, the Commission's decision against the bakery was affirmed, so the bakery took the case to the U.S. Supreme Court.

In a 7–2 decision, the majority ruled that the Commission did not employ religious neutrality, citing the Commission's hostility towards Masterpiece owner Jack Phillips's religious objections. The Supreme Court found the Commission violated his rights to free exercise, and reversed the Commission's decision. The Court did not rule on the broader intersection of anti-discrimination laws, free exercise of religion, and freedom of speech, due to the complications of the Commission's lack of religious neutrality, which was later evaluated in 303 Creative LLC v. Elenis (2023).

== Procedural history ==
=== Facts of the case ===
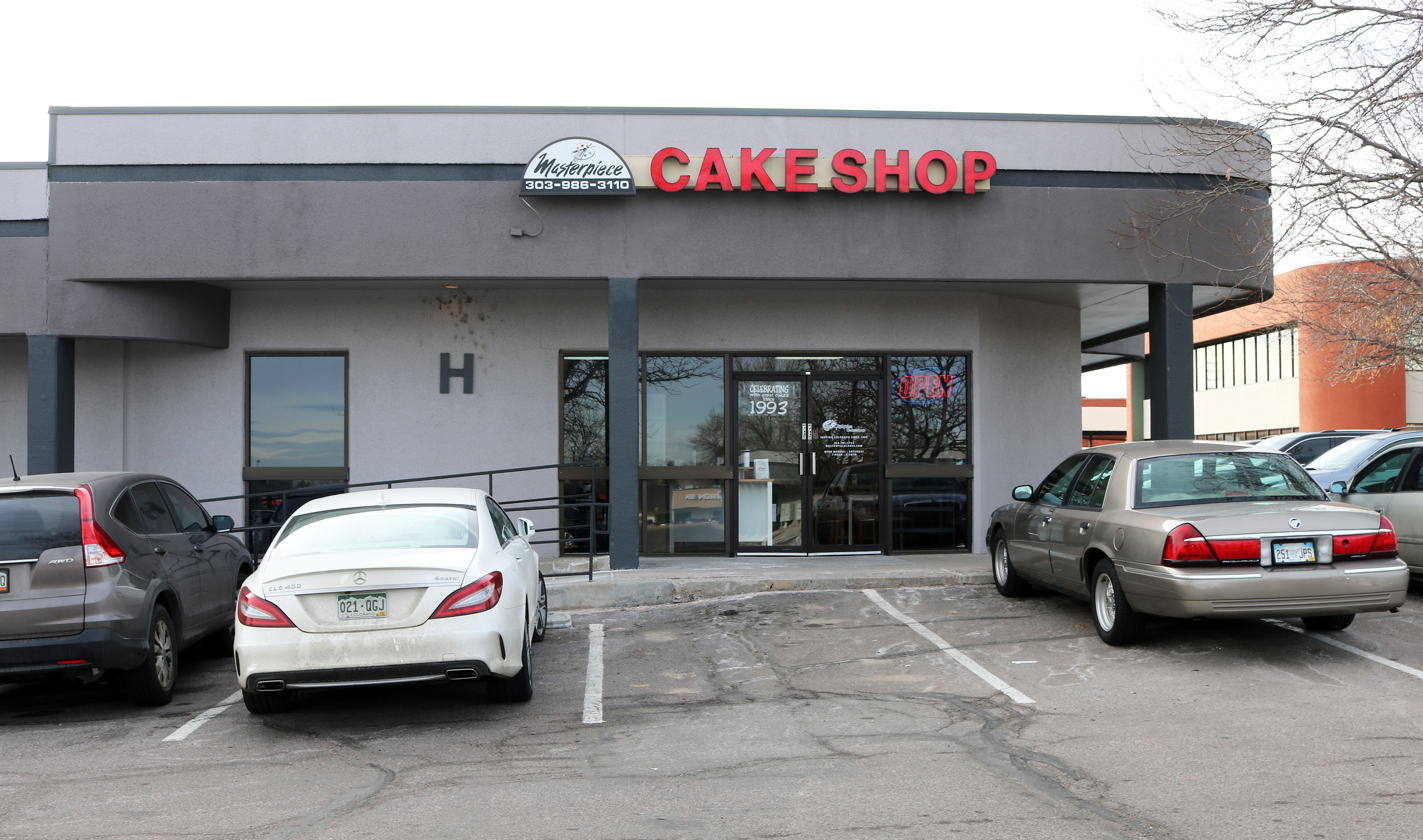
Masterpiece Cakeshop in Lakewood, Colorado

In 2012, same-sex couple Charlie Craig and David Mullins from Colorado made plans to be lawfully married in Massachusetts and return to Colorado to celebrate with their family and friends. At that time the state constitution prohibited same-sex marriage in Colorado, though by 2014 the state had allowed same-sex marriages, and the Supreme Court of the United States would affirm that gay couples have the fundamental right to marry in Obergefell v. Hodges 576 U.S. 644 (2015).

Craig and Mullins visited Masterpiece Cakeshop in Lakewood, Colorado, in July 2012 to order a wedding cake for their return celebration. Masterpiece's owner Jack Phillips, who is a Christian, declined their cake request, informing the couple that he did not create wedding cakes for marriages of gay couples owing to his Christian religious beliefs, although the couple could purchase other baked goods in the store. Craig and Mullins promptly left Masterpiece without discussing with Phillips any of the details of their wedding cake. The following day, Craig's mother, Deborah Munn, called Phillips, who advised her that Masterpiece did not make wedding cakes for the weddings of gay couples because of his religious beliefs and because Colorado did not recognize same-sex marriage at the time.

=== Colorado Civil Rights Commission ===
While another bakery provided a cake to the couple, Craig and Mullins filed a complaint with the Colorado Civil Rights Commission under the state's public accommodations law, the Colorado Anti-Discrimination Act, which prohibits businesses open to the public from discriminating against their customers on the basis of race, religion, gender, or sexual orientation. Colorado is one of twenty-one U.S. states that include sexual orientation as a protected class in their anti-discrimination laws. Craig and Mullins's complaint resulted in a lawsuit, Craig v. Masterpiece Cakeshop. The case was decided in favor of the plaintiffs; the cake shop was ordered not only to provide cakes to same-sex marriages, but to "change its company policies, provide 'comprehensive staff training' regarding public accommodations discrimination, and provide quarterly reports for the next two years regarding steps it has taken to come into compliance and whether it has turned away any prospective customers".

=== Colorado Court of Appeals ===
Masterpiece appealed the decision to the state Court of Appeals with the aid of Alliance Defending Freedom, and refused to comply with the state's orders, instead opting to remove themselves from the wedding cake business; Phillips claimed that this decision cost him 40% of his business. Alongside the Colorado Civil Rights Commission, the American Civil Liberties Union represented Craig and Mullins during the appeals. The state's decision was upheld on the grounds that despite the nature of creating a custom cake, the act of making the cake was part of the expected conduct of Phillips's business, and not an expression of free speech nor free exercise of religion. The court distinguished its decision in Craig from another case, brought to the Commission by William Jack, in which three bakeries refused to create a cake for William Jack with the message "Homosexuality is a detestable sin. Leviticus 18:22", citing that in the latter, the bakeries had made other cakes for Christian customers and declined that order based on the offensive message rather than the customers' creed, whereas Masterpiece Cakeshop's refusal to provide Craig and Mullins with a wedding cake "was because of its opposition to same sex marriage which...is tantamount to discrimination on the basis of sexual orientation".

The Supreme Court of Colorado declined to hear an appeal.

== Before the Supreme Court ==
=== Petition for writ of certiorari ===
Masterpiece Cakeshop petitioned the U.S. Supreme Court for certiorari (review), under the case name Masterpiece Cakeshop, Ltd. v. Colorado Civil Rights Commission, of the following question:

Whether applying Colorado's public accommodations law to compel Phillips to create expression that violates his sincerely held religious beliefs about marriage violates the Free Speech or Free Exercise Clauses of the First Amendment.

Both the Colorado Civil Rights Commission and the American Civil Liberties Union (ACLU) urged the Supreme Court to reject the appeal, fearing that a Court decision in favor of the business would create a "gaping hole" in civil rights laws on the basis of religion. The final briefs at the certiorari stage were received in December 2016. The Court agreed to hear the case in the 2017 term and heard oral arguments on December 5, 2017.

Masterpiece requested that the Supreme Court review the Colorado anti-discrimination law under strict scrutiny. It argued that while the state's law was intended to assure that same-sex couples had access to the same services as heterosexual couples, the law went too far in its enforcement, since Craig and Mullins were easily able to obtain a wedding cake from a different vendor in the state. Masterpiece further argued that the anti-discrimination law can be used to selectively discriminate against religion, as the Commission has allowed bakers to refuse to provide cakes with anti-same-sex marriage messages on them, even though the Commission said these refusals were appropriate due to the offensiveness of the messages and not on the basis of religion. The State and the ACLU countered these points, stating that the law was aimed only at conduct of a business, not their speech, and in cases like a wedding cake, "[no] reasonable observer would understand the Company's provision of a cake to a gay couple as an expression of its approval of the customer's marriage". They further argued that the cakeshop could provide catchall language to explain that any services they provide do not endorse any expressions of free speech associated with it, an allowance within the anti-discrimination law.

=== Amicus briefs ===
Around 100 legal briefs were filed by third parties, roughly equally split in supporting either side of the case. Many civil rights organizations filed briefs in support of Craig and Mullins, including the NAACP Legal Defense Fund, the Lawyers' Committee for Civil Rights Under Law, Southern Poverty Law Center, the Washington Lawyers' Committee for Civil Rights and Urban Affairs, and the Civil Rights Forum, a group of plaintiff-side civil rights attorneys. The National Women's Law Center argued in its amicus brief that just as the Court compared the effects of race and sexual discrimination in Roberts v. U.S. Jaycees, it should compare those harms to those created by sexual-orientation discrimination in this case.

The United States Department of Justice under the Trump administration, supported Phillips. While the Department asserts that anti-discrimination laws are necessary to prevent businesses that provide goods and services from discriminating, these laws cannot be used to compel a business into expressing speech they do not agree with, nor used to provide goods and services with such expressions without the ability for the business to assert they do not agree with those expressions. The brief was criticized by several organizations, including those that support LGBT rights, claiming the brief as a pattern of hostile actions by the Trump administration and fearing that a decision in favor of Masterpiece would enable such businesses to have a "license to discriminate".

=== Oral arguments ===
Oral arguments
Recording of oral arguments before the Supreme Court.

Oral arguments for the plaintiffs were provided by Kristen Waggoner for the Alliance Defending Freedom, representing Phillips, and the Solicitor General of the United States Noel Francisco, presenting the federal government's case as amicus curiae in support of Masterpiece Cakeshop. The defendants' arguments were given by Colorado Solicitor General Frederick Yarger, on behalf of the Colorado Civil Rights Commission, and David D. Cole of the ACLU, on behalf of Craig and Mullins. Questions asked by the Justices attempted to determine where the bounds of a cake baker's rights and the rights of those soliciting his services would extend by considering several hypothetical situations involving the making of and selling custom cakes, including situations related to racial and gender-preference discrimination.

Experts believed the Supreme Court's opinions in the case would be divided, with the ultimate decision falling on the opinion of Justice Anthony Kennedy, who has historically been a swing vote in his term. In his past case history, he had been a strong supporter of gay rights (having authored all of the landmark gay rights rulings by the Supreme Court: Romer v. Evans in 1996, Lawrence v. Texas in 2003, United States v. Windsor in 2013, and Obergefell v. Hodges in 2015), and a corporation's freedom of speech in his majority opinion for Citizens United v. FEC 558 U.S. 310 (2010), and freedom of religion through his concurrence with the majority in Burwell v. Hobby Lobby Stores, Inc. 573 U.S. 682 (2014).

== Opinion of the Court ==
=== Majority opinion ===
The Court issued its ruling on June 4, 2018, reversing the decision of the Colorado Civil Rights Commission. Justice Anthony Kennedy authored the majority opinion, joined by Chief Justice John Roberts, and Justices Samuel Alito, Stephen Breyer, Elena Kagan and Neil Gorsuch. The opinion stated that although a baker, in his capacity as the owner of a business serving the public, "might have his right to the free exercise of his religion limited by generally applicable laws", nevertheless, a State decision "in which religious hostility on the part of the State itself" is a factor violates the "State's obligation of religious neutrality" under the Free Exercise Clause of the First Amendment to the Constitution. Kennedy's opinion stated that the Commission's review of Phillips's case exhibited hostility towards his religious views. The Commission compared Phillips's religious beliefs to defense of slavery or the Holocaust. Kennedy found such comparisons "inappropriate for a Commission charged with the solemn responsibility of fair and neutral enforcement of Colorado's anti-discrimination law". Kennedy's opinion also cited the three exemptions the Commission previously granted for the non-discrimination law arising from the William Jack complaints. The opinion also noted differences in handling previous exemptions as indicative of Commission hostility towards religious belief, rather than maintaining neutrality. Kennedy's opinion noted that he may have been inclined to rule in favor of the Commission if it had remained religiously neutral in its evaluation.

=== Concurring opinions ===
Justice Kagan wrote a concurring opinion, joined by Breyer, emphasizing the narrow grounds of the ruling. Justice Gorsuch also wrote a concurring opinion, joined by Alito. Both Kagan's and Gorsuch's concurrences considered how the Commission handled Masterpiece differently from prior exemption requests. Both agreed that the Commission exhibited hostility towards Phillips's religious beliefs and concurred with the reversal. Kagan posited the Commission could have ruled differently in the two situations if they had stayed religiously neutral. Gorsuch indicated the Commission should maintain consistency among similar cases.

Justice Clarence Thomas wrote another opinion, concurring in part and concurring in the judgment, joined by Gorsuch. Thomas asserted that the majority opinion did not consider the free speech or the anti-discrimination implications of the case, despite significant attention during oral arguments. Thomas expressed support for Masterpiece, both on grounds of free speech and free exercise.

=== Dissenting opinions ===
Justice Ruth Bader Ginsburg wrote the dissenting opinion, joined by Justice Sonia Sotomayor. Ginsburg believed that the Commission acted fairly in evaluating the case, saying "what critically differentiates them is the role the customer's 'statutorily protected trait' played in the denial of service".

== Analysis ==
The Court avoided ruling broadly on the intersection of anti-discrimination laws and rights to free exercise. Instead the court addressed both sides. State actors like the Colorado Civil Rights Commission on the one hand must ensure neutral and respectful consideration of claims for religious exemptions from anti-discrimination laws which are made by people who exercise their First Amendment right to free exercise of religion. However, this exemption will not apply broadly because future disputes like the one in Masterpiece "must be resolved with tolerance, without undue disrespect to sincere religious beliefs, and without subjecting gay persons to indignities when they seek goods and services in an open market". The Supreme Court also specifically made it clear, on the other hand, that gay Americans are also entitled to strong defense rights. Justice Kennedy wrote: "[t]he First Amendment ensures that religious organizations and persons are given proper protection as they seek to teach the principles that are so fulfilling and so central to their lives and faiths. Nevertheless, while those religious and philosophical objections are protected, it is a general rule that such objections do not allow business owners and other actors in the economy and in society to deny protected persons equal access to goods and services under a neutral and generally applicable public accommodations law."

Kennedy's decision specifically noted the hostility towards Phillips made by the Commission as their reason to reverse the ruling, but because of the existence of this hostility in the current case, they could not rule on the broader issue regarding anti-discrimination law and the free exercise of religion. Kennedy stated that "[t]he outcome of cases like this in other circumstances must await further elaboration in the courts, all in the context of recognizing that these disputes must be resolved with tolerance, without undue disrespect to sincere religious beliefs, and without subjecting gay persons to indignities when they seek goods and services in an open market". Kennedy's decision affirmed that there remains protection of same-sex couples and gay rights which states can still enforce through anti-discrimination laws, a point also agreed to by Ginsburg's dissent. The general constitutionality of anti-discrimination laws to prevent discrimination against sexual orientation affirmed by the Masterpiece decision was reflected in lower courts that same week, in a case decided by the Arizona Court of Appeals, Brush & Nib Studio v. Phoenix, which upheld the city of Phoenix's anti-discrimination ordinance that included sexual orientation. The Court of Appeals extensively quoted Masterpiece in affirming the Arizona Superior Court's prior decision.

The Alliance Defending Freedom, which represented Masterpiece, supported the Court's decision in finding that condemned the Commission's review of Phillips's case, stating that "Tolerance and respect for good-faith differences of opinion are essential in a society like ours". The American Civil Liberties Union welcomed the part of the decision affirming protection of gay rights, stating that the Court "reaffirmed its longstanding rule that states can prevent the harms of discrimination in the marketplace, including against L.G.B.T. people". The decision was also welcomed by the NAACP Legal Defense and Educational Fund. Sherrilyn Ifill, LDF's President and Director-Counsel, stated: "The narrow ruling [...] is based on the universal principle that constitutional claims must be heard in every instance before a neutral tribunal. More important was the affirmation of eight Justices that discrimination in public accommodations enjoys no First Amendment protection. This principle has long been an essential piece of the civil rights movement and established anti-discrimination law. This is particularly important today, in 2018, when people of color are still experiencing persistent and widespread discrimination while they shop, eat, or access other public spaces."

Another predominate case involving anti-discrimination laws and religious freedom that was in the court system during Masterpiece was the Arlene's Flowers lawsuit in Washington, with the issue over flower arrangements being provided for a same-sex wedding. Prior to the decision in Masterpiece, a petition for writ of certiorari had been issued to the Supreme Court. Following the decision of Masterpiece, the flower shop owner used that decision to assert that they were shown similar religious hostility, and requested their case to be reheard. On June 25, 2018, the Supreme Court dismissed the pending petition, and ordered that lower courts review the flower shop's case in a similar light as Masterpiece. On review at the Washington State Supreme Court, the court ruled against Arlene's Flowers in June 2019 that there was no evidence of religious animus. Similarly, a case from Oregon, Klein v. Oregon Bureau of Labor and Industries, had reached the Oregon Supreme Court before the Supreme Court heard Masterpiece. The Oregon Supreme Court declined to overturn an anti-discrimination ruling made against a bakery by the Oregon Court of Appeals, with the baker petitioning the federal Supreme Court to hear the case. In June 2019, the Supreme Court granted certiorari, and in a summary judgement, vacated the Appeals Court ruling and required the case be heard again in light of the decision on Masterpiece.

Masterpiece's basis of evaluating statements of public officials to determine if there was religious hostility in evaluating cases arose in Justice Sotomayor's dissent in Trump v. Hawaii, 585 U.S. 667 (2018), which dealt with President Trump's travel ban against several nations which had a high Muslim population. While the majority ruled that the ban was within the President's powers and sent the case back to lower courts to rule on other matters, Sotomayor believed that the decision of Masterpiece should have been used to judge President Trump and his administration's statements that she believed showed hostility towards Muslims and would have not justified the ban.

== Subsequent events ==
=== 303 Creative LLC v. Elenis ===
The Supreme Court granted certiorari in 303 Creative LLC v. Elenis in February 2022, which again dealt with Colorado's anti-discrimination laws applying to public businesses. The case concerned a Christian web designer who sought to make wedding announcement websites only for heterosexual weddings. She feared punishment under Colorado's anti-discrimination law and thus aimed to block the law as a violation of her First Amendment rights. On June 30, 2023, the Court ruled in the web designer's favor, stating that Colorado's anti-discrimination law cannot compel a website designer to create products that include speech they disagree with.

=== Scardina ===
Masterpiece Cakeshop became involved in a similar case in 2018. In June 2017, on the same day the Supreme Court agreed to hear Masterpiece Cakeshop v. Colorado Civil Rights Commission, the bakery had refused to bake a birthday cake with a pink interior and blue exterior for Autumn Scardina, a transgender woman and Colorado lawyer. Phillips stated later that he had refused based on his Christian beliefs that a person does not get to choose their gender. According to Scardina, Phillips initially accepted the order for the pink-and-blue cake but then refused after learning the cake was to be used to celebrate Scardina's gender transition. Scardina stated that she had placed her order at Masterpiece Cakeshop with the intent to "challenge the veracity" of Phillips's assertions that he would serve LGBT customers under circumstances other than those of the earlier case.

Scardina complained to the Colorado Division of Civil Rights, which found in June 2018 sufficient evidence that the bakery discriminated against her transgender status, and ordered the parties into compulsory mediation. In August 2018, Phillips sued the state, seeking a permanent injunction against enforcement of the relevant anti-discrimination law against him. He also sought punitive damages. Colorado Governor John Hickenlooper, named as a defendant in the suit, expected the Supreme Court to revisit its decision from Masterpiece, as the previous ruling "did not address the basic issue" of religious freedom. In January 2019, when Hickenlooper was no longer governor, a federal judge removed him from the suit.

In March 2019, the suit and countersuit between Phillips and the state were dropped. The state argued that, although the core issue (the intersection of nondiscrimination and religious freedom) remained unresolved, the existing case was not the proper vehicle to answer those questions. The agreement allowed Scardina, should she want, to pursue her own civil action against Masterpiece.

In June 2019, Scardina brought civil suit against Phillips in federal district court on the perceived discrimination. In April 2020, beyond the appeal deadline, Scardina brought a second lawsuit against Phillips in a different court, seeking more than $100,000 in damages, fines, and attorney's fees. On June 15, 2021, Denver District Judge A. Bruce Jones ruled that Phillips had violated Colorado's anti-discrimination law by refusing to bake a cake for Scardina and fined him $500. The Alliance Defending Freedom (ADF), the group representing Phillips, said it would appeal.

In October 2022, the Colorado Court of Appeals heard the case. On January 26, 2023, the court ruled that a pink-and-blue cake was not a protected form of speech and that the state nondiscrimination law did not violate the baker's freedom of religion. Phillips appealed to the Colorado Supreme Court in oral arguments in June 2024; Phillips urged the lower court decision to be reversed based on the 303 Creative decision from the United States Supreme Court. In October 2024, the Colorado Supreme Court dismissed the case in a 4-3 ruling, saying that Scardina had lacked standing to sue as she had not exhausted her options to seek redress through another court before filing her lawsuit. The Court did not rule on whether Phillips had discriminated against Scardina or whether Phillips' First Amendment rights had been violated. Justice Melissa Hart wrote "We express no view on the merits of these claims" in the majority opinion.

== See also ==
- Lee v Ashers Baking Company Ltd and others, a similar case from the UK
- List of LGBTQ-related cases in the United States Supreme Court
- List of United States Supreme Court cases by the Roberts Court
- 2017 term opinions of the Supreme Court of the United States
