= Alan E. Sears =

American lawyer

Alan Sears
- Education: University of Louisville (BA, JD)
- Occupation: Lawyer

Alan E. Sears is an American lawyer. He served as the president, CEO, and general counsel of the Alliance Defending Freedom until January 2017. Sears was also the staff executive director of the Attorney General's Commission on Pornography, popularly known as the Meese Commission.

== Education, faith, and family ==
Sears graduated with a bachelor's degree from the University of Louisville. He earned a J.D. degree from the University of Louisville Louis D. Brandeis School of Law.

Sears was raised in the Baptist church, but converted to Roman Catholicism in 1988 before marrying his wife, Paula. Sears and Paula were jointly invested in the Pontifical Equestrian Order of St. Gregory the Great on June 29, 2017.

== Career ==
=== Government ===
Sears served as a prosecutor in the U.S. Attorney's office for western Kentucky. During his time as a federal prosecutor Sears served as staff executive director of the Attorney General's Commission on Pornography also known as the Meese Commission. This commission was established by Attorney General William French Smith at the direction of President Reagan in early 1985. The commission became popularly known as the Meese Commission after Edwin Meese III, Smith's successor, announced the names of its eleven members in May 1985. Although he was not a voting member, Sears was influential on the commission and vigorously supported strengthening anti-obscenity laws.

Sears served as associate solicitor under Secretary Donald Hodel at the Department of the Interior.

=== Alliance Defending Freedom ===
Sears led the Alliance Defending Freedom (ADF), a Christian right legal advocacy group founded in 1994, for more than twenty years. Under his leadership, the ADF won a string of victories in lawsuits on behalf of the conservative Christian movement. By 2014, the ADF had an annual budget of $40 million and more than 40 staff attorneys, and had "emerged as the largest legal force of the religious right, arguing hundreds of pro bono cases across the country." Sears retired as ADF's president and CEO in 2017. However, he continued to be an employee of ADF until 2020, when he earned $800,000 in the role of "Founder."

In June 2017, Sears was named a knight of the Papal Order of St. Gregory.

== Writing ==
Sears has co-written two books with Craig Osten, both published by the Southern Baptist Convention's media and distribution division B&H Publishing Group.

The Homosexual Agenda, published in 2003, has been described by the Southern Poverty Law Center as "an anti-LGBT call to arms that links homosexuality to pedophilia and other 'disordered sexual behavior'". The book was accused of claiming that allowing same-sex marriage was a part of a secret agenda by activists to “lead young men and women into homosexual behavior” and trap them in a homosexual lifestyle. The book also accused gay-rights advocates as trying to create a nation of “broken families and broken lives.”

Sears and Osten also co-wrote The ACLU vs. America: Exposing the Agenda to Redefine Moral Values, published in 2005.

== Bibliography ==
- Sears, Alan; Craig Osten (2003). The Homosexual Agenda: Exposing the Principal Threat to Religious Freedom Today. B&H Books. ISBN 978-0-8054-2698-4.
- Sears, Alan; Craig Osten (2005). The ACLU vs. America: Exposing the Agenda to Redefine Moral Values. B&H Books. ISBN 978-0-8054-4045-4.

Additional books by Alan Sears: Novels "In Justice", self-published through the Christian publishing house WinePress Publishing and "Trial & Error", self-published through the Christian Xulon Press.
