= J. Budziszewski =

American political philosopher (born 1952)

- Born: 1952 (age 73–74)
- Occupation: Academic

Academic background
- Education: University of Chicago; University of South Florida (BA); University of Florida (MA); Yale University (PhD)
- Thesis: Accidie, Anomie, Polity: Moral Personality and Moral Discourse in a Skeptical Age (1981)

Academic work
- Discipline: Political science
- Institutions: University of Texas at Austin

J. Budziszewski (born 1952) is an American philosopher and political scientist. He is a professor of government and philosophy at the University of Texas at Austin, where he has taught since 1981. He specializes in ethics, political philosophy and the interaction of these two fields with religion and theology.

Budziszewski has written widely, in both scholarly and popular venues, about a variety of moral and political issues including abortion, marriage, sexuality, capital punishment, and the role of judges in a constitutional republic. His principal area of publication is the theory of natural law. He has been a leading advocate for natural law theory over the past twenty years. In this context, he has given particular attention to the problem of moral self-deception. Among his research interests are also virtue ethics and the problem of tolerance.

== Education ==
After graduating from high school in 1970, Budziszewski enrolled at the University of Chicago for its biopsychology program and for the left-wing groups on its campus. After two years as an undergraduate, he left the university in order to learn a trade and became a welder. He later returned to college and graduated from the University of South Florida with a Bachelor of Arts in political science in 1975. He then earned a Master of Arts in political science from the University of Florida in 1977 and his Ph.D. in political science from Yale University in 1981.

== Career ==
He has been teaching at the University of Texas at Austin since finishing his doctoral studies in 1981, where he teaches courses on the American Founding and the natural law tradition of Thomas Aquinas.

Apart from his scholarly philosophical work, Budziszewski is known for articles and books of Christian apologetics, addressed to a broad audience including young people and college students. He was known as one of the prominent evangelical intellectuals in America.

== Personal life ==
Raised Baptist, Budziszewski later became an atheist, then an Episcopalian and was received into the Catholic Church on Easter Sunday 2004. Since his conversion, he has continued to address his writings and lectures on Christian themes to Protestant, Catholic, and Orthodox Christians, as well as to those who are uncertain of their beliefs but are sincerely seeking.

== Research ==
=== Self-deception ===
One of Budziszewski's research interests has been to analyze what he regards as general human tendency to self-deception. The problem arises from a theoretical tenet defended by Thomas Aquinas, who he said "we must say that the natural law, as to general principles, is the same for all, both as to rectitude and as to knowledge." This claim amounts to saying that the most general principles of right and wrong are not only right for everyone but known to everyone, even though the same cannot be said of their remote implications. According to Budziszewski, Aquinas is right. He argues that often, even when people appear to be ignorant of the moral basics, the hypothesis that they are self deceived provides a better explanation of their actual behavior.

This leads to Budziszewski's theory of guilty knowledge, of violated conscience. Following Aquinas, Budziszewski distinguishes between synderesis, which supplies the first principles of practical reason and which he calls "deep conscience," and conscientia, which he calls "surface conscience" and supplies judgments about particular acts. According to Budziszewski, conscience operates in three different modes: In the cautionary mode, it alerts us to the peril of moral wrong and generates an inhibition against committing it. In the accusatory mode, it indicts us for wrong we have already done. In the avenging mode, it punishes the individual who knowingly does wrong but refuses to admit that he or she has done so. Conscience is therefore teacher, judge, or executioner, depending on the mode in which it is working.

The most original part of this schema is what Budziszewski says about the avenging mode. The most obvious penalty of guilty knowledge is the feeling of remorse. Remorse is not always present. However, Budziszewski suggests that even when remorse is absent, guilty knowledge generates objective needs for confession, atonement, reconciliation, and justification. Calling these other four "Furies" the "greater sisters of remorse," he argues that they are "inflexible, inexorable, and relentless, demanding satisfaction even when mere feelings are suppressed, fade away, or never come."

He argues that

[t]he normal outlet of remorse is to flee from wrong; of the need for confession, to admit what one has done; of atonement, to pay the debt; of reconciliation, to restore the bonds one has broken; and of justification, to get back in the right. But if the Furies are denied their payment in [their proper] coin, they exact it in whatever coin comes nearest, driving the wrongdoer's life yet further out of kilter. We flee not from wrong, but from thinking about it. We compulsively confess every detail of our story, except the moral. We punish ourselves again and again, offering every sacrifice except the one demanded. We simulate the restoration of broken intimacy, by seeking companions as guilty as ourselves. And we seek not to become just, but to justify ourselves.

Budziszewski holds that the only way to break this vicious circle is to admit that one has done wrong and to repent, in reliance on the grace of God. Failure to break out of the vicious circle leads to a variety of moral pathologies in the individual, the culture, and the body politic.

=== Tolerance ===
A second major area of Budziszewski's scholarly work is the problem of toleration. Budziszewski considers toleration one of the virtues. Like the Aristotelian moral virtues, it lies in a mean between extremes. One way to miss the mark is overindulgence, whereby we tolerate what we ought not tolerate. The other way is narrowmindedness, whereby we fail to tolerate what we ought to tolerate. Because "tolerating" means not just putting up with things, but to put up with things that we find false, bad, or offensive, the question may arise why toleration is a virtue at all. According to Budziszewski, the answer is that sometimes the nature of the good itself requires putting up with some evil. Christians, for example, tolerate atheists not because they are in doubt about the truth of Christian beliefs, but because of their conviction that faith, by its nature, cannot be coerced, and that God does not desire unwilling obedience.

This analysis of tolerance makes Budziszewski a sharp critic of contemporary liberal theories of toleration, which are commonly based on moral neutrality, on suspension of judgment about goods and evils. Budziszewski insists that if we were to suspend judgment consistently, we could neither defend the practice of toleration, nor decide which bad things should be tolerated. The true foundation of toleration is not suspension of judgment, but better judgment, and not neutrality about goods and evils, but deeper insight into them. Indeed, argues Budziszewski, the proponents of neutralist theories actually suspend judgment only selectively, using a facade of neutrality in order to smuggle their moral views into policy without having to defend them.

=== Aquinas and natural law ===
A significant portion of Budziszewski's work focused on the natural law tradition. His understanding of the natural law is much indebted to that of Thomas Aquinas. In his book, The Line Through the Heart, Budziszewski attempts to show us how the natural law continues to illuminate the ethical and political dimensions of human existence today despite our best efforts to ignore it. Natural law is a fact in that it is real, we know it, and we cannot change it. It is a theory because we can reflect on our pre-theoretical knowledge of the natural law and attempt to develop a systematic account of it. Finally, the natural law is a scandal, it angers us because it confronts us.

A Thomist, Budziszewski has most recently undertaken an ongoing series of publications on the work of Thomas Aquinas, especially line-by-line commentaries on the Summa Theologica.

== Works ==
=== Books ===
- The Resurrection of Nature: Political Theory and the Human Character (January 1, 1986; Out Of Print)
- The Nearest Coast of Darkness: A Vindication of the Politics of Virtues (August 31, 1988; Out Of Print)
- Written on the Heart: The Case for Natural Law (May 14, 1997)
- True Tolerance: Liberalism and the Necessity of Judgment (January 1, 1999; Out Of Print)
- How to Stay Christian in College (April 1, 1999)
- The Revenge of Conscience: Politics and the Fall of Man (October 1, 1999; Formerly Out Of Print)
- What We Can't Not Know: A Guide (January 1, 2003)
- Ask Me Anything: Provocative Answers for College Students (January 1, 2004 as J. Budziszewski aka Professor Theophilus; Out Of Print)
- Natural Law for Lawyers (January 1, 2006)
- Evangelicals in the Public Square: Four Formative Voices (June 1, 2006; Out Of Print)
- Ask Me Anything 2: More Provocative Answers for College Students (May 8, 2008 as J. Budziszewski aka Professor Theophilus; Out Of Print)
- The Line Through The Heart: Natural Law as Fact, Theory, and Sign of Contradiction (May 15, 2009)
- On the Meaning of Sex (November 15, 2011)
- Commentary on Thomas Aquinas's Treatise on Law (January 1, 2014)
- Commentary on Thomas Aquinas’s Virtue Ethics (April 20, 2017)
- Commentary on Thomas Aquinas’s Treatise on Happiness and Ultimate Purpose (January 9, 2020)
- Commentary on Thomas Aquinas on Divine Law (April 15, 2021)
- How and How Not to Be Happy (March 1, 2022)
- Commentary on Thomas Aquinas's Treatise on the One God (October 31, 2024)
- Pandemic of Lunacy: How To Think Clearly When Everyone Around You Seems Crazy (February 3, 2026)

=== Other media ===
In addition to these publications, Budziszewski has written and published several hundred articles, blog publications, "office hours" dialogue pieces, question-and-answer replies from public inquiries, and reformatted altered publications of previous chapters and articles in different forms. Additionally, he has given over three hundred interviews, including an exclusive television interview on EWTN's The Journey Home in 2005 shortly following his conversion to the Catholic faith.
