= Arlene's Flowers lawsuit =

Group of merged civil suits

The Arlene's Flowers lawsuit was a group of merged civil suits brought against Arlene's Flowers of Richland, Washington, US, by a couple whose longtime florist declined service of their same-sex wedding, represented by the American Civil Liberties Union (ACLU), and by Washington Attorney General Bob Ferguson. The lawsuits gained national attention due to their religious and civil rights implications. The Supreme Court of the United States let stand two unanimous verdicts by the Washington state Supreme Court that same-sex couples cannot be discriminated against on the basis of religious freedom.

Stutzman opted to settle with Ingersoll in November 2021, paying him $5,000, as she was getting close to retirement and wanted to stop accumulating legal fees related to the case. While she had filed a petition for rehearing in September 2021 to the Supreme Court, she withdrew it following the settlement. During 2022, Stutzman sold the shop to Kim Solheim, who changed the store's policies to welcome LGBTQ+ clients. The store permanently closed on March 31, 2025 after Solheim filed for bankruptcy.

== Legal case ==
The first two legal cases, Ingersoll v. Arlene's Flowers and State of Washington v. Arlene's Flowers were consolidated by Benton County Superior Court Judge Salvador Mendoza into a single case for purposes of discovery.

The first civil suit, Ingersoll v. Arlene's Flowers, was filed by Plaintiffs Robert Ingersoll and Curt Freed, a gay couple, after Barronelle Stutzman, the owner of Arlene's Flowers, denied floral arrangements for their wedding. The couple had been customers of Stutzman's shop for nine years, but when they asked her to provide flowers for their wedding, the florist declined, citing her Christian beliefs. The same-sex couple who had been denied access to Stutzman's services, Robert Ingersoll and Curt Freed, were represented by the ACLU in their lawsuit against the business on grounds of discrimination per the anti-discrimination laws of the state of Washington. Attorneys for the ACLU proposed a settlement in the suit with the following conditions: Stutzman making a public apology, donating $5,000 to a local LGBT youth center, and a promise to no longer refuse service to customers based on their sexual orientation. The legal group representing Stutzman, Alliance Defending Freedom, countered the settlement offer, stating she should not be required to violate her religious beliefs.

The second suit against Stutzman was a consumer protection suit filed by state Attorney General Bob Ferguson. The premise of the suit, State of Washington v. Arlene's Flowers, was filed by Ferguson in order to uphold the state's Consumer Protection Act. Upon settlement, the decision would bring a $2,000 fine under the Washington Consumer Protection Act, a $1 payment for costs, and agreement not to discriminate in the future. Stutzman, however, responded that she would not comply, with her counsel citing the state's constitution in regard to "freedom of conscience in all matters of religious sentiment". Following Stutzman's response, Benton County Superior Court Judge Alexander Ekstrom ruled on January 7, 2015 that she could be sued in her personal capacity.

A third lawsuit, Arlene's Flowers v. Ferguson, was filed as a countersuit by Stutzman to claim financial hardship she suffered as a result of the previous two lawsuits.

Judge Ekstrom ruled on February 18, 2015 that Stuzman had violated the state's anti-discrimination law in both cases. The next day, Stutzman's lawyers announced they would appeal the ruling. On March 27, 2015, Judge Ekstrom ordered Stutzman to pay a $1,000 fine and $1 for court costs and fees.

Via GoFundMe, Stutzman received over $174,000 in individual donations before the website removed her donation page citing a violation of their terms of service. GoFundMe stated their policy bars fundraising campaigns it deems discriminatory.

On November 15, 2016, state Attorney General Ferguson personally argued the case before the Washington Supreme Court; the hearing was held before an audience at an auditorium on the campus of Bellevue College. On February 16, 2017, the state Supreme Court unanimously ruled against Stutzman, holding that her floral arrangements do not constitute protected free speech, and that providing flowers to a same-sex wedding would not serve as an endorsement of same-sex marriage. Rejecting Stutzman's Free Exercise Clause claim, Justice Sheryl Gordon McCloud wrote, "this case is no more about the access to flowers than civil rights cases were about access to sandwiches."

Following the state high court's decision, Stutzman filed a petition for a writ of certiorari in the Supreme Court of the United States, asking the Court to hear the case. During this case, a similar case, Masterpiece Cakeshop v. Colorado Civil Rights Commission, had made its way to the Supreme Court, and which was decided in early June 2018. The ruling was made on procedural grounds in that the bakery owner's religious views were treated with hostility by the Colorado Civil Rights Commission, and remanded that a new hearing be made. Stutzman, on this news, stated that she had also found her religious views treated with hostility by the state of Washington, and sought a similar rehearing. On June 25, 2018, the U.S. Supreme Court granted the petition for a writ of certiorari, vacated the judgment, and remanded the case to the Supreme Court of Washington for further consideration in light of the Masterpiece Cakeshop decision. On June 6, 2019, the Washington Supreme Court unanimously ruled against Stutzman again, finding no evidence of religious animus. Stutzman's attorneys once again requested the U.S. Supreme Court to take her case, but certiorari was denied in July 2021.

== See also ==
- LGBT rights in Washington (state)
- Freedom of religion in the United States
