= 303 Creative LLC v. Elenis =

2023 U.S. Supreme Court case on free speech

- Supreme Court of the United States

Argued December 5, 2022 Decided June 30, 2023
- Full case name: 303 Creative LLC, et al. v. Aubrey Elenis, et al.
- Docket no.: 21-476
- Citations: 600 U.S. 570 (more)
- Argument: Oral argument
- Opinion announcement: Opinion announcement
- Decision: Opinion

Case history
- Prior: 303 Creative LLC v. Elenis, 385 F. Supp. 3d 1147 (D. Colo. 2019). Aff’d, 6 F.4th 1160 (10th Cir. 2021).

Questions presented
- Whether applying a public-accommodation law to compel an artist to speak or stay silent violates the Free Speech Clause of the First Amendment.

Holding
- The First Amendment prohibits Colorado from forcing a website designer to create expressive designs speaking messages with which the designer disagrees. United States Court of Appeals for the Tenth Circuit reversed.

Court membership
- Chief Justice John Roberts Associate Justices Clarence Thomas · Samuel Alito; Sonia Sotomayor · Elena Kagan; Neil Gorsuch · Brett Kavanaugh; Amy Coney Barrett · Ketanji Brown Jackson

Case opinions
- Majority: Gorsuch, joined by Roberts, Thomas, Alito, Kavanaugh, Barrett
- Dissent: Sotomayor, joined by Kagan, Jackson

Laws applied
- U.S. Const. amend. I, Colorado Anti-Discrimination Act

303 Creative LLC v. Elenis, 600 U.S. 570 (2023), is a United States Supreme Court decision that dealt with the intersection of anti-discrimination law in public accommodations and the Free Speech Clause of the First Amendment to the United States Constitution. In a 6–3 decision, the Court ruled in favor of a website designer, ruling that the state of Colorado cannot compel the designer to create work that violates her values. The case follows from Masterpiece Cakeshop v. Colorado Civil Rights Commission, 584 U.S. 617 (2018), which had dealt with similar conflict between free speech rights and Colorado's anti-discrimination laws but had been decided on narrower grounds.

Both Masterpiece Cakeshop and 303 Creative involved questions of whether a U.S. state's anti-discrimination laws can require designers to create works that recognize same-sex marriages, when same-sex marriage conflicts with those designers' beliefs. The decision in 303 Creative was seen by some as a victory for free speech rights as well as religious liberty and by others as a setback for LGBTQ rights and an assertion of discrimination as a type of free speech.

== Background ==
Per Smith's legal counsel and court filings, Lorie Smith received a request via the 303 Creative website from someone named "Stewart" inquiring about services, potentially including a website, for a wedding between themselves and "Mike". Based on his information in court filings, Stewart was contacted and stated he was straight and married to a woman, and also a web designer himself. The origin of the apparently fake request is unknown and the request had no bearing on the outcome of the Supreme Court case.

Smith is a website designer, running a limited liability company as 303 Creative, LLC. registered in Colorado. Smith had been selling website development services and wanted to move into making wedding announcement websites. Smith claimed it would have been against her Christian faith to make sites for same-sex marriages. She wanted to post a notice on her business website to notify users of her unwillingness to create websites promoting same-sex marriages, and instead would refer gay patrons to other potential designers who may provide services to them.

Before implementing the notice, Smith discovered that such a notice would violate the Colorado state anti-discrimination laws that were amended in 2008, which prevent public businesses from discriminating against people based on their gender identity or sexual orientation. Smith, represented by the Alliance Defending Freedom (ADF), sued Colorado in 2016 in the United States District Court for the District of Colorado, seeking to block enforcement of the anti-discrimination law in a pre-enforcement challenge.

The district court waited for the result of the 2018 Supreme Court case Masterpiece Cakeshop v. Colorado Civil Rights Commission, which dealt with the same anti-discrimination law and also dealt with a business owner's refusal to provide wedding-related services to gay couples. As Masterpiece was ruled on narrow procedural grounds, finding that the Colorado agency that ruled against Jack Phillips (the cakeshop owner) was unfairly hostile to his religious beliefs, the district court accepted review of the pre-enforcement challenge, but ruled against Smith and upheld the law's constitutionality in 2019.

Smith appealed to the United States Court of Appeals for the Tenth Circuit. The Tenth Circuit took up Smith's pre-enforcement challenge, finding Smith had "sufficiently demonstrated both an intent to provide graphic and web design services to the public in a manner that exposes them to [Colorado Anti-Discrimination Act] liability, and a credible threat that Colorado will prosecute them under that statute." The Tenth Circuit still ruled in favor of the state in a 2–1 ruling. In the majority ruling, the Tenth Circuit recognized Smith's pre-enforcement challenge that her First Amendment rights would be violated, but ruled that Colorado's anti-discrimination law satisfied strict scrutiny, deepening a circuit split with decisions issued by the Arizona Supreme Court and the United States Court of Appeals for the Eighth Circuit. Chief Judge Timothy Tymkovich dissented from the Tenth Circuit's decision, writing "the majority takes the remarkable – and novel – stance that the government may force Ms. Smith to produce messages that violate her conscience."

== Supreme Court ==
Smith filed a petition for a writ of certiorari, which the Supreme Court granted in February 2022. While the petition asked whether Employment Division v. Smith should be overruled, the Supreme Court limited the case to the question of whether Colorado's law violates the Free Speech Clause of the First Amendment. Unlike the previous decision in Masterpiece, where the court had a 5–4 majority of conservative justices, 303 Creative was heard under a 6–3 conservative majority following the retirement of Anthony Kennedy and death of Ruth Bader Ginsburg, replaced with Justices Brett Kavanaugh and Amy Coney Barrett, respectively. This new court was seen as more favorable to religious rights based on several key cases decided during previous terms.

About 75 amicus briefs were submitted prior to oral hearings. Among those supporting Smith were 20 conservative-leaning states, law professors, several religious organizations, and libertarian-leaning think tanks such as the Americans for Prosperity Foundation and the Cato Institute. Those supporting the state of Colorado included twenty other liberal states, the Biden administration, law professors, and liberal-leaning groups such as Public Citizen, the American Civil Liberties Union, and the NAACP Legal Defense Fund.

The case was argued on December 5, 2022. Court observers believed the conservative majority would favor Smith in that she should not be compelled to write speech against her faith, but were concerned about where to draw a line so that other anti-discrimination laws would not be affected by their decision.

=== Opinions ===
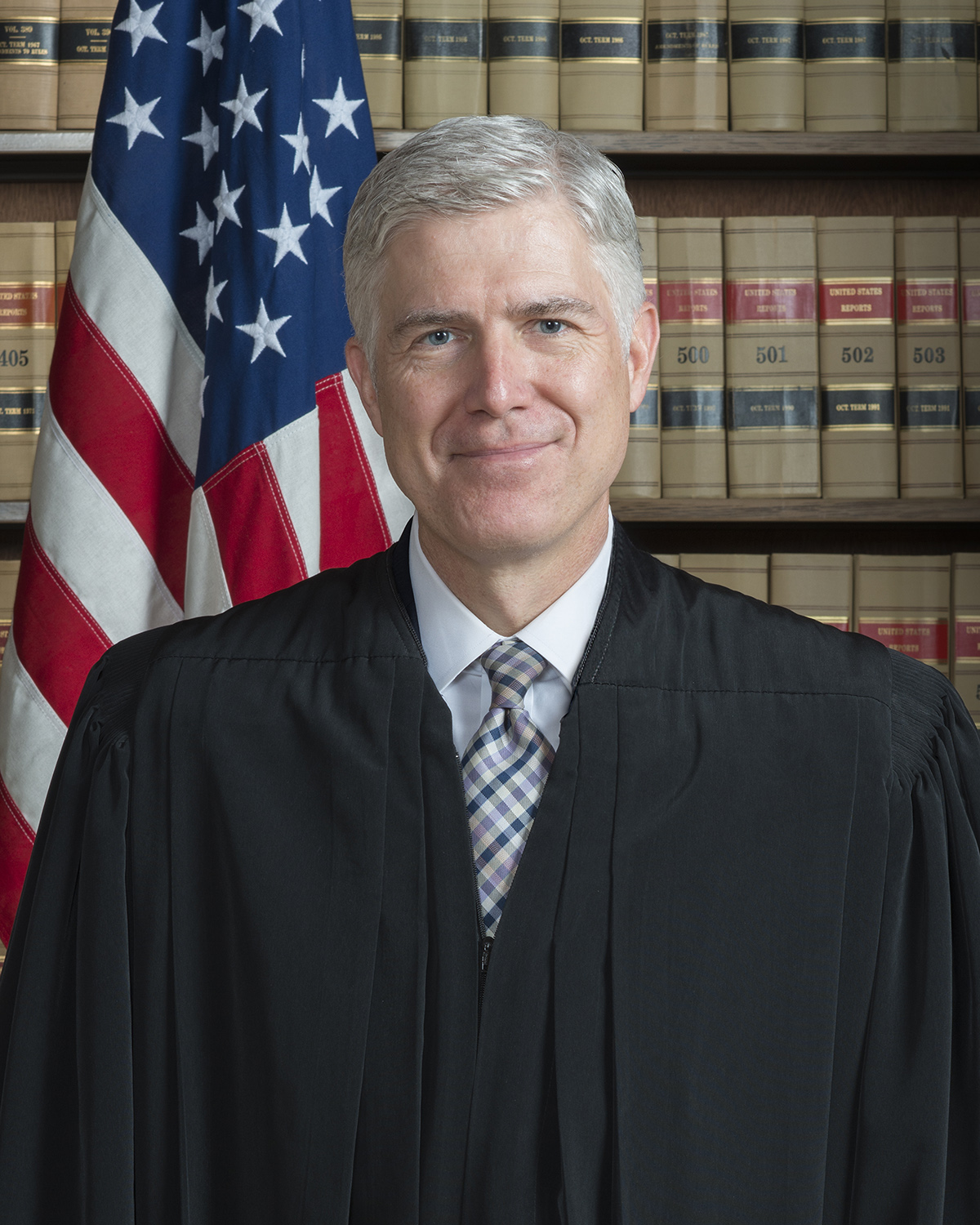
Justice Neil Gorsuch delivered the opinion of the majority.

The Court issued its 6–3 decision, ruling in favor of Smith, on June 30, 2023.

The majority opinion, written by Justice Neil Gorsuch, stated that, while public accommodation laws are not per se unconstitutional (since "there are [...] innumerable goods and services that no one could argue implicate the First Amendment"), a businessperson cannot be compelled to create a work of art which goes against their values and which they would not produce for any client. Gorsuch wrote that in Smith's case, it was clear that the website she wanted to design would be her own expressions, and thus protected by the First Amendment, as agreed to by parties during the Tenth Circuit trial. However, Gorsuch cautioned that the question of "what qualifies as expressive activity protected by the First Amendment" remained open as it was unnecessary to define that for the purpose of this case.

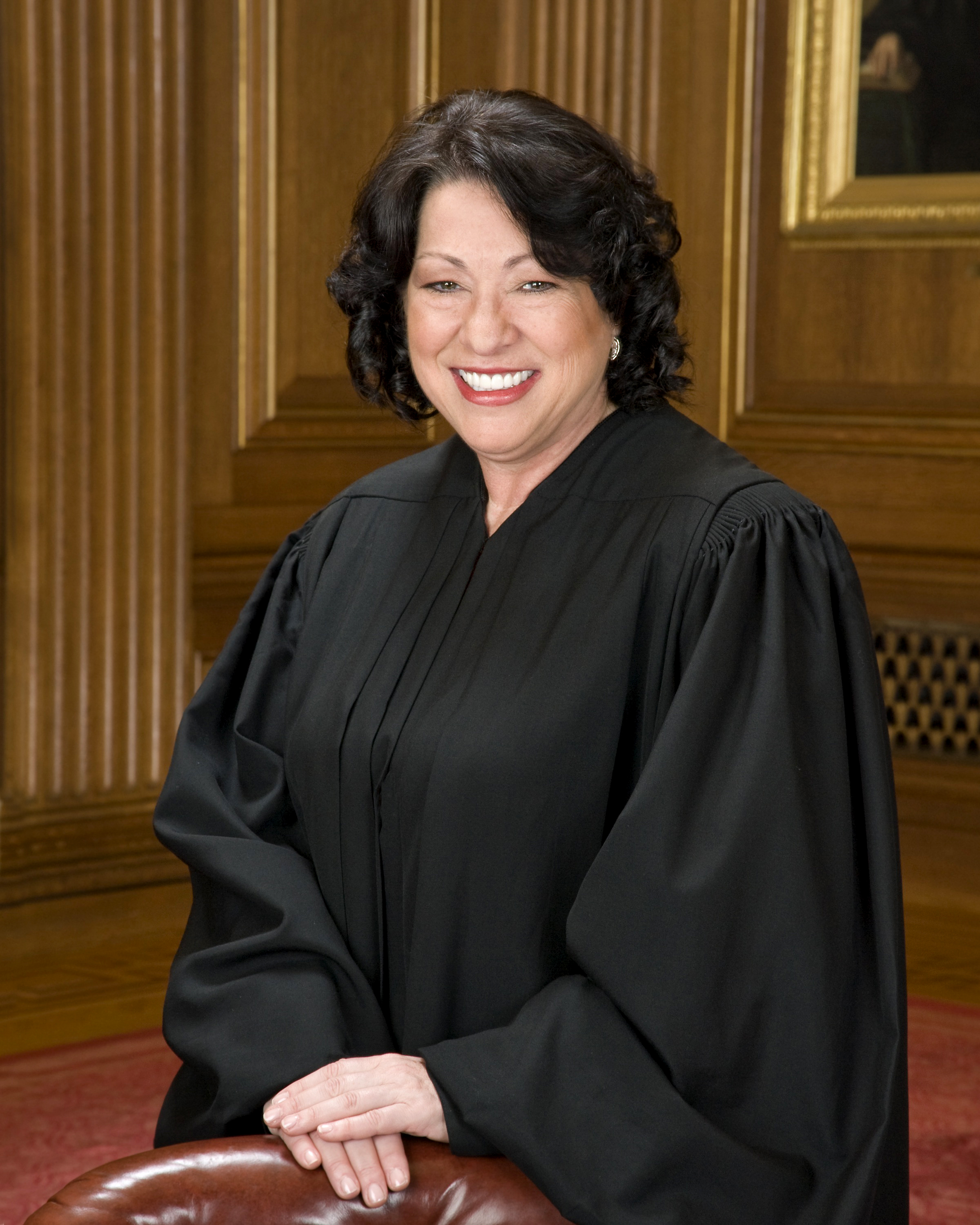
Justice Sonia Sotomayor authored the dissent.

In a dissent joined by Justices Kagan and Jackson, Justice Sotomayor wrote that the decision "grants a business open to the public a constitutional right to refuse to serve members of a protected class", and that, under the majority's reasoning, stationers and photographers could be allowed to turn down clients on the basis of their sexual orientation or gender identity.

== Impact ==
The majority opinion in 303 Creative was viewed by Smith and her team, as well as some liberal and libertarian advocacy groups as a victory for free speech. Religious groups additionally viewed it as affirming religious liberty rights. The Christian Institute for example called the Supreme Court decision "a landmark decision".

It has been seen as a setback for LGBTQ protections by advocacy groups such as the Human Rights Campaign and nonprofit legal organizations such as the American Civil Liberties Union. Critics took up Sotomayor's dissent in arguing that the decision would give private businesses a constitutional right to discriminate against LGBTQ clients. President Joe Biden also expressed concern over the possible increase in discrimination of LGBTQ citizens beyond the bounds of the Court's decision. He stated "In America, no person should face discrimination simply because of who they are or who they love. The Supreme Court's disappointing decision in 303 Creative LLC v. Elenis undermines that basic truth, and painfully it comes during Pride month when millions of Americans across the country join together to celebrate the contributions, resilience, and strength of the LGBTQI+ community."

Legal experts opined that 303 Creative would lead to additional lawsuits to test the bounds of the definition of creative works that are covered by decision. Mary Bonauto, the civil rights director of GLAD, said that the ruling was a "mixed bag", stating that she saw the ruling as protecting only businesses that offered services as unique and specific as Smith's. On the other hand, Katherine Franke, the director of the Center for Gender and Sexuality Law at Columbia Law School, called the ruling "sweeping" and that it used the First Amendment to override anti-discrimination laws for protected classes in general.

== Questions on case legitimacy ==
When Smith's suit was filed at the federal district court in 2016, she had not begun designing websites, nor had she received any requests to design a wedding website for a same-sex couple. In 2017, her lawyers from the ADF filed an affidavit from Smith stating that she had received such a request several days after the initial filing, and appended a copy of the request. Smith never responded to the request, and has stated that she feared she would violate Colorado's law if she were to do so. However, the name, email, and phone number on the online form belong to a man who has long been married to a woman, and who stated that he never submitted such a request, as reported by The New Republic on June 29, 2023, a day before the Supreme Court's decision was released. The ADF stated on June 30 that they believe the name was submitted to Smith's website by "a third party or a troll" using the man's personal details; neither they nor their client attempted to verify the requestor's identity.

Colorado did not consider the claimed website submission as an actual website and dismissed the request as evidence. The federal district judge, Judge Marcia S. Krieger dismissed the website request claim as there was no indication that the request actually involved a gay couple. Legal experts did not see the request having a decisive impact on the way the Supreme Court ruled on the matter, although constitutional law scholar Erwin Chemerinsky suggested that if the falsity of the request had come up in litigation, the court could have sent the case back to the district court to resolve the factual issue. The discovery of this claim in the ADF filings had led to questions of why this information was not discovered before the case was decided by the Supreme Court. It was later discovered by The New Republic that Smith had made a wedding website for a heterosexual couple in 2015, which had been removed from her business's profile prior to her filing the case but remained visible in the Wayback Machine archives. Kate Redburn, a fellow and lecturer at Columbia Law School, stated to The New Republic that the discovery of this website "could seriously undermine [Smith]'s story by revealing a fourth option", as Smith appeared to have offered wedding website services before filing the case without repercussions related to free speech.

The New Republic article notes that, "[Smith's] website six months prior to the lawsuit being filed in 2016 does not include any of the Christian messaging that it did shortly afterward...archived versions of the site show."

The controversial ruling sparked widespread criticism from prominent legal theorists and law reviews regarding the plaintiff's lack of standing. ADF's president and CEO called it "a critical ruling affirming all Americans' free speech".

== See also ==
- List of LGBTQ-related cases in the United States Supreme Court
- Jones v. Alfred H. Mayer Co., private discrimination case based on race
- Public accommodations in the United States
- Lee v Ashers Baking Company Ltd and others, a UK Supreme Court case cited in 303 Creative
- Religion and business § Landmark United States Supreme Court cases
- 2020s anti-LGBTQ movement in the United States
