= Legality of conversion therapy =

Legality of sexual orientation and gender identity change efforts

Map of jurisdictions that have bans on sexual orientation and gender identity change efforts with minors as of October 2026: Criminal prohibition against conversion therapy on the basis of sexual orientation and gender identity Only medical professionals are banned from performing conversion therapy No ban on conversion therapy

Conversion therapy is the pseudoscientific practice of attempting to change a person's sexual orientation or gender identity. As of October 2026, twenty-eight countries have bans on conversion therapy. Fourteen of them ban the practice by any person: Belgium, Canada, Cyprus, Ecuador, France, Germany, Iceland, Malta, Mexico, Netherlands, New Zealand, Norway, Portugal and Spain.

Eight ban its practice by medical professionals (or, in some cases, those who receive monetary compensation without necessarily being medical experts) only: Albania, Brazil, Chile, Greece, India, Israel, Taiwan and Vietnam.

Another seven, namely Argentina, Fiji, Nauru, Paraguay, Samoa, Switzerland and Uruguay, have bans for diagnoses based solely on sexual orientation or gender identity, without specifically banning conversion therapy. This effectively amounts to a ban on health professionals since they would not generally engage in therapy without a diagnosis. In addition, jurisdictions within Australia and the United States also ban conversion therapy. (Note: In the US, conversion therapy for children is banned outright in the states of California, Colorado, Connecticut, Delaware, Hawaii, Illinois, Maine, Maryland, Massachusetts, Michigan, Minnesota, Nevada, New Hampshire, New Jersey, New Mexico, New York, Oregon, Pennsylvania, Rhode Island, Utah, Vermont, Virginia and Washington, as well as in the District of Columbia (where it is also banned for adults), Puerto Rico, and various cities, counties and municipalities. Additionally, Arizona, North Carolina and Wisconsin prohibit the use of federal or state government funds for conversion therapy for children. In Australia, conversion therapy is banned in the Australian Capital Territory, New South Wales, Queensland, South Australia and Victoria. Conversion therapy bans have also been proposed in Tasmania and Western Australia.)

At a supranational level, the European Union is considering banning conversion therapy across its member states. Similarly, citizens' initiative started collecting signatures in May 2024 calling on the European Commission to outlaw such practices. On January 29, 2026, the Parliamentary Assembly of the Council of Europe adopted a resolution urging member states to ban conversion therapy.

== Legal status by country ==
Country	Medical treatment banned	Criminal penalties	Details
Albania	(Note: Prohibited by professional ethics associations.)		Practice by medical professionals banned: Albania's national psychological association banned its members from practising conversion therapy in 2020.
Argentina	(Note: Prohibited by law.)		Diagnosis by medical professionals banned: Since 2010, no diagnosis can be made in the field of mental health on the exclusive basis of "sexual choice or identity". The ban only applies to registered health professionals.
Australia		Treatment banned in some jurisdictions	Banned explicitly in four states and one territory: Conversion therapy is an explicit criminal offense in: Queensland since 2020 under the Health Legislation Amendment Act 2020, the Australian Capital Territory since 2021 under the Sexuality and Gender Identity Conversion Practices Act 2020, Victoria since 2022 under the Change or Suppression (Conversion) Practices Prohibition Act 2021, South Australia since 1 April 2025 under the Conversion Practices Prohibition Act 2024; New South Wales since 4 April 2025 under the Conversion Practices Ban Act 2024.; However Western Australia, the Northern Territory and Tasmania have not introduced any bills to criminally ban conversion therapy yet.
Austria		Bill proposed to ban treatment	Nationwide ban proposed: In July 2022, the Justice Ministry confirmed it was preparing a draft bill to ban conversion therapy, following unanimous motions of the National Council calling on it to do so.
Belgium	Treatment banned	Treatment banned	Nationwide ban: On 20 July 2023, Parliament approved a law that bans conversion practices, defined as "any practice consisting of or including physical intervention or the application of psychological pressure, which the perpetrator or victim believes or claims is intended to repress or to alter a person's sexual orientation, gender identity or gender expression, whether that characteristic is actually present or merely assumed by the perpetrator." Punishment ranges from imprisonment of 8 days to 2 years and/or a fine of 208 to 2400 euros, and a professional ban up to 5 years.
Bolivia	Treatment banned		Practice by medical professionals banned: The Comprehensive Care Standard for the LGBTIQ+ population in health facilities, issued by the Ministry of Health and Sports in 2022, bans conversion therapy. Section 10.2 on Specific Recommendations to be taken into account states that "Guidance should be given on the danger of resorting to "reconversion and reparative therapies" that have no scientific basis and can generate psychological consequences for the person. Remember that such therapies are prohibited." Section 12.3 on Specific Recommendations for the Health Care Team states that "Reparative Therapy, which seeks to change a person's sexual orientation or gender identity, is inherently coercive and incompatible with health care."
Brazil	Treatment banned		Practice by medical professionals banned: In 1999, the Federal Council of Psychology issued two provisions which state that "psychologists shall not collaborate in events or services offering treatment and cure for homosexuality", and that "psychologists will neither pronounce nor participate in public speeches, in the mass media, reinforcing social prejudice related to homosexuals as pursuing any kind of psychological disorder". Brazil thus became the first country in the world to ban conversion therapy. In 2013, the Commission for Human Rights of Brazil's lower house of Congress, headed by Marco Feliciano, an evangelical Christian preacher, approved legislation that would nullify the council's provisions and legalize conversion therapy. After strong public objection in the wave of the 2013 protests in Brazil, the bill was voted down by the National Congress. In September 2017, a federal judge in Brasília approved the use of conversion therapy by a psychologist to "cure" people of homosexuality, overruling the 1999 decision. However, in December 2017, the same judge changed his decision, keeping the "treatment" banned. In January 2018, the Federal Psychology Council established norms of performance for psychologists in relation to transgender and transvestite people, also banning any conversion therapy. A criminal ban has been proposed in the Federal District, Brasilia. In October 2024, CFP established norms forbidding pathologization of intersex people.
Canada		Treatment banned	Main article: List of Canadian jurisdictions banning conversion therapy Nationwide ban: Conversion therapy is illegal for both adults and minors under the Criminal Code. The ban took effect on 7 January 2022, 30 days after Bill C-4 received royal assent. Prior to the federal prohibition, it was banned in the province of Manitoba (since 2015), for minors in Ontario (since 2015), for minors (though allowed for "mature minors" between the ages of 16 and 18 if they consent) in Nova Scotia (since 2018), for minors in Prince Edward Island (since 2020), in Quebec (since 2020), the territory of Yukon (since 2020), and numerous municipalities including Vancouver (since 2018), Edmonton (since 2019), and Calgary (since 2020). On 23 September 2020. Bill C-6 was introduced by the government in the House of Commons, it would have prohibited performing conversion therapy on a child, forcing someone to undergo conversion therapy against their will, advertising or materially benefiting from conversion therapy, and removing a child from Canada to perform conversion therapy. On 22 June 2021, it passed the lower house (263 to 63), and was sent to the Senate. However the Senate failed to pass the bill after some senators objected to the government's request to recall the chamber from its summer recess, so that the bill may have been considered before Parliament was dissolved for an expected snap election. The election was called on 15 August and the bill died on the order paper. On 29 November, the re-elected government introduced a new version of the bill (C-4) for the 44th Parliament, which broadened the ban's coverage to include adults, and identified it as one of its priority bills it hoped to pass before the end of the year. The bill passed the House of Commons on 1 December without a recorded vote after all parties unanimously agreed to expedite it, and likewise passed the Senate on 7 December. The bill received royal assent on 8 December 2021, and came into effect on 7 January 2022.
Chile	Treatment banned	Bill proposed to ban treatment	Practice by medical professionals banned: In March 2023, the Ministry of Health issues Circular B2 No. 6 instructing all individual and institutional health providers, both public and private, the prohibition of the implementation of "conversion therapies" for not be valid clinical practices. It also recognizes that diagnoses of mental health status cannot be based on criteria biasedly related to sexual orientation or gender identity and gender expression. Criminal ban proposed: Proposed criminal ban was approved by the Chilean Senate in 2021. The bill is currently being discussed in the Chamber of Deputies. Diagnosis by medical professionals banned: Law 21.331 on the Recognition and Protection of the Rights of People in Mental Health Care, enacted on 23 April 2021, states in its article 7: "The diagnosis of the state of mental health must be established as dictated by the clinical technique, considering biopsychosocial variables. It cannot be based on criteria related to the political, socioeconomic, cultural, racial or religious group of the person, nor to the identity or sexual orientation of the person, among others." In February 2016, the Chilean Ministry of Health expressed their opposition to conversion therapy. The statement said: "We consider that practices known as conversion therapies represent a grave threat to health and well-being, including the life, of the people who are affected."
China		No	Case-by-case ban: In China, courts have ruled instances of conversion therapy to be illegal on two occasions; however, legal precedents in China are not enforceable in future cases. In December 2014, a Beijing court ruled in favor of a gay man in a case against a conversion therapy clinic. The court ruled that such treatments are illegal and ordered the clinic to apologize and pay monetary compensation. In June 2016, a man from Henan Province sued a hospital in the city of Zhumadian for forcing him to undergo conversion therapy, and was also awarded a public apology and compensation. Following these two successful rulings, LGBT groups are now calling on the Chinese Health Ministry to ban conversion therapy. However, as of April 2019, no measure has been taken by the government to ban conversion therapy, and such treatments are still in fact being actively promoted throughout the country.
Colombia		Bill proposed to ban treatment	Nationwide ban proposed: In June 2023, Congress approved a bill to ban conversion therapy at first reading.
Cyprus		Treatment banned	Nationwide ban: In May 2023, the Cyprus Parliament passed a bill criminalizing conversion therapy.
Ecuador		Treatment banned	Nationwide ban: In Ecuador, the Government's view is that conversion therapy is proscribed by a 1999 law banning anti-gay discrimination. In addition, Article 151 of the 2014 Penal Code prohibits conversion therapy, equating it to torture, and provides 10 years' imprisonment for those practicing it. In January 2012, the Ecuadorian Government raided three conversion therapy clinics in Quito, rescued dozens of women who were abused and tortured in an effort to "cure their homosexuality", and promised to shut down every such clinic in the country. This action was the result of a 10-year campaign by Fundación Causana, an Ecuadorian activist group, which called attention to more than 200 illegal "ex-gay clinics" that were targeting lesbians and operating under the guise of being drug rehabilitation centers.
Fiji	Treatment banned		Practice by medical professionals banned: The Mental Health Decree 2010 states that people are not to be considered mentally ill if they refuse or fail to express a particular sexual orientation, and prohibits any conversion therapy in the field of mental health. The ban only applies to registered health professionals.
Finland		Citizens' initiative advanced to ban treatment	Nationwide ban proposed: A citizens' initiative calling for a ban was first brought before the Finnish parliament in 2021, but this initiative was allowed to lapse. After the election of 2023, a new initiative was proposed and the requisite 50,000 signatures collected in June 2023.
France		Treatment banned	Nationwide ban: On 7 December 2020, the French Senate approved a ban on conversion therapy by a vote of 305–28, France's National Assembly had passed a similar ban earlier. The Senate version of the bill was adopted by the National Assembly on 25 January 2022, by a vote of 142–0, and was officially published on 1 February 2022.
Germany		Treatment banned for minors	Nationwide ban: In 2008, the German Government declared itself completely opposed to conversion therapy. In February 2019, German Health Minister Jens Spahn said he will seek to ban conversion therapies that claim to change sexual orientation. The government banned conversion therapy for all minors in December 2019. Adult conversion therapy is only deemed illegal if consent was given due to "lack of will power" such as deceit or coercion. Psychotherapeutic and pastoral care "purposefully trying to influence one's sexual orientation" was also banned. The ban also applies to legal guardians "grossly violating their duty of care". On 7 May 2020, German parliament Bundestag banned nationwide conversion therapy for minors until 18 years and forbids advertising of conversion therapy. It also forbids conversion therapy for adults, if they are decided by force, fraud or pressure.
Greece		Treatment banned for minors	Nationwide ban: In May 2022, the Greek Parliament banned conversion therapy for minors. Conversion therapy for adults remains possible if they give their consent. Advertising is forbidden.
Iceland		Treatment banned	Nationwide ban: The Iceland Parliament passed a bill to ban conversion therapy on 9 June 2023, with a vote of 53-0 with 3 abstentions.
India	Treatment banned		Practice by medical professionals banned: On 7 June 2021, in an interim order for the case S Sushma v. Commissioner of Police, Justice N Anand Venkatesh of the Madras High Court issued a directive to the National Medical Commission and Indian Psychiatric Society. The directive aimed to prohibit any attempts by medical professionals to "cure" or alter an individual's sexual orientation to heterosexual or gender identity to cisgender. The court ordered that action be taken against professionals involved in any form or method of "conversion therapy," including revocation of their license to practice. In compliance with the high court's directives, on 2 September 2022, the National Medical Commission officially prohibited medical professionals from practicing conversion therapy. The commission further empowered State Medical Councils to take disciplinary action against medical professionals found to be providing "conversion therapy."
Iran		No (Note: Endorsed by the state.)	Legal and state-backed: In Iran, homosexuality is illegal and carries the death penalty per Islamic law. Numerous government ministries have condemned homosexuality under the influence and control of religious institutions. Health professionals, religious institutions, and others promote conversion therapy, This may include counseling, prayer, aversion therapy, drugs, hormones, shock therapy, and even sex reassignment surgery. The scope of conversion therapy in Iran is not known.
Ireland		Bill proposed to ban treatment	Nationwide ban proposed: The Prohibition of Conversion Therapies Bill 2018 had passed second reading in the Seanad Éireann (Irish Senate), but died when Parliament was dissolved ahead of the 2020 election. The bill was reintroduced following the 2020 Irish general election. In 2023, at the suggestion of Minister for Children, Equality, Disability, Integration and Youth Roderic O'Gorman, the Irish Government announced that they will introduce a new law to ban conversion therapy and its advertising.
Israel	Treatment banned		Practice by medical professionals banned: The Health Ministry banned medical professionals from conducting conversion therapy in February 2022. In October 2014, the Ministry of Health issued a statement announcing that it considers conversion therapy to "create false impressions of scientific recognition even though there is no scientific evidence that it is at all successful. It may also cause harm to the individual." In February 2016 and in March 2017, the Knesset rejected bills introduced by former Health Minister Yael German that would have banned conversion therapy in Israel for minors. The bills were rejected 37–45 and 26–38, respectively. These efforts were blocked by Orthodox Jewish parties. In 2019, the Israel Medical Association decided to expel members who continue to practice conversion therapy. However, as of 2020 conversion therapy continues to be widely offered by religious organizations such as Atzat Nefesh under the euphemism "therapy for reversed inclinations". In July 2020, a bill against conversion therapy passed the preliminary reading. It later didn't succeed in its first reading.
Lebanon			In 2013, the Lebanese Psychiatric Society stated that conversion therapy seeking to "convert" gays and bisexuals into straights has no scientific backing and asked health professionals to rely only on science when giving opinion and treatment in this matter.
Malaysia		No	Legal and state-backed: In February 2017, the Malaysian Government endorsed conversion therapy, claiming homosexuality can be "cured" through extensive training. In June 2017, the Health Ministry began a film competition to find the best way to "cure" and prevent homosexuality. The competition was later cancelled, following massive outrage.
Malta		Treatment banned	Nationwide ban: In December 2016, the Parliament of Malta unanimously approved the Affirmation of Sexual Orientation, Gender Identity and Gender Expression Act, becoming the first country in the European Union to ban conversion therapy. The bill had been supported by the Malta Chamber of Psychologists, the Maltese Association of Psychiatry, the Malta Association for the Counselling Profession, and the Malta Association of Family Therapy and Systemic Practice.
Mexico	Treatment banned	Treatment banned	Nationwide ban: Between October 2022 and April 2024, the two chambers of the Mexican Congress approved unanimously the reform proposed in 2018 to the Federal Penal Code and the General Health Law to ban conversion therapy. The promulgation of the bill was finally done in June 2024. The federal ban hasn’t stopped 22 of 32 federal entities from keeping their local bans in place: Mexico City (2020), State of Mexico (2020), Oaxaca (2021), Baja California Sur (2021), Zacatecas (2021), Yucatán (2021), Tlaxcala (2021), Colima (2021), Jalisco (2022), Baja California (2022), (Hidalgo (state)) Hidalgo (2022), Sonora (2022), Nuevo León (2022), Puebla (2022), Querétaro (2022), Sinaloa (2023), Morelos (2023), Quintana Roo (2023), Guerrero (2024), Chiapas (2025), Tamaulipas (2025), and Durango (2025). The Federal Penal Code sanctions anyone who practices or funds these therapies with prison, fine, or dismissal. The General Health Law establishes suspension for healthcare-related workers who practice or fund conversion therapy.
Nauru	Treatment banned		Practice by medical professionals banned: The Mentally-Disordered Persons (Amendment) Act 2016 states that people are not to be considered mentally disordered if they express or exhibit or refuse or fail to express a particular sexual preference or sexual orientation. The ban only applies to registered health professionals.
Netherlands	Treatment banned	Treatment banned	Nationwide ban: Organizations offering conversion therapy in the Netherlands are not eligible for subsidies. In addition, since June 2012, conversion therapies have been blocked from coverage by healthcare insurance. In September 2025, the lower house of the Netherlands Parliament passed a bill to ban conversion therapy. The upper house passed the bill on 16 June 2026. The bill was ratified on 8 September 2026.
New Zealand		Treatment banned	Nationwide ban: In August 2018, Justice Minister Andrew Little announced that a conversion therapy ban could be considered as part of a reform to the Human Rights Act 1993. After this plan was voted down by coalition partners New Zealand First, the Labour Party announced in October 2020 it would definitively ban the practise if re-elected. In late July 2021, Justice Minister Kris Faafoi announced a proposed law banning conversion therapy. The Conversion Practices Prohibition Legislation Act 2022 was passed by parliament with 112 votes in favour and 8 against in February 2022.
Norway		Treatment banned	Criminal ban: In 2000, the Norwegian Psychiatric Association overwhelmingly voted for the position statement that "homosexuality is no disorder or illness, and can therefore not be subject to treatment. A 'treatment' with the only aim of changing sexual orientation from homosexual to heterosexual must be regarded as ethical malpractice, and should have no place in the health system". On 12 December 2023, the Norwegian Parliament by a vote of 85-15 passed a law banning conversion therapy practices with sentences up to 6 years imprisonment for the most serious cases.
Paraguay	Diagnosis banned		Diagnosis by medical professionals banned: Article 3 of Law 7018 on Mental Health, enacted on 15 November 2022, establishes that: "In no case can a diagnosis be made in the field of mental health on the exclusive basis of sexual choice or identity."
Peru	Treatment banned		Practice by medical professionals banned: The Ministry of Health clarified that sexual orientation and gender identity are not diseases and thus they should not be subject to conversion therapies in May 2024, reiterating a 2021 technical document. Additionally, Article 9(3)(d) of Regional Ordinance No. 017-2008 (2008) of the Department of Apurímac prohibits forcing a person to undergo medical and/or psychological treatment in order to alter or modify their sexual orientation.
Philippines	No	Treatment banned in some jurisdictions	No nationwide ban Local ban in Quezon City (2025)
Poland		No	No ban: There is no ban on conversion therapy in Poland. A bill was drafted by politicians from the Nowoczesna party to ban it in 2019. In 2020, Polish bishops issued a 27-page document about LGBT issues, which included a call for "clinics to help people who want to regain their natural sexual orientation".
Portugal	Treatment banned	Treatment banned	Criminal ban: On 22 December 2023, Parliament passed a law banning conversion therapy. Practice by medical professionals banned: In 2019, the regulatory Ordem dos Psicólogos affirmed that conversion therapy has no basis in science and that its members cannot perform it.
Samoa	Diagnosis unlawful		Practice by medical professionals banned: The Mental Health Act 2007 states that people are not to be considered mentally ill if they refuse or fail to express a particular sexual orientation, and prohibits any conversion therapy in the field of mental health. The ban only applies to registered health professionals.
South Africa			The South African Society of Psychiatrists states that "there is no scientific evidence that reparative or conversion therapy is effective in changing a person's sexual orientation. There is, however, evidence that this type of therapy can be destructive". In February 2015, owners of a conversion therapy camp were found guilty of murder, child abuse and assault with intent to do grievous bodily harm after three teens were found dead at the camp. The teens were beaten with spades and rubber pipes, chained to their beds, not allowed to use the toilet at any time and forced to eat soap and their own feces, all with the aim of "curing" their homosexuality.
Spain	Treatment banned	Treatment banned	Nationwide ban: Conversion therapy was banned nationwide by congress on 16 February 2023. Conversion therapy had previously been banned in the autonomous communities of Murcia (since 2016), Madrid (since 2017), Valencia (since 2017), Andalusia (since 2018), and Aragon (since 2019). The specifics vary by jurisdiction. For instance, in Murcia, the ban only applies to registered health professionals, but the Madrid ban applies to everyone including religious groups. The Spanish Psychological Association states that there is no evidence to support conversion therapy. "On the contrary, there is evidence that conversion therapy leads to anxiety, depression and suicide". In April 2019, following an exposé of conversion therapy in Spain, the Spanish health minister Maria Luisa Carcedo said the Spanish government would consider legislating to stamp out the practice. In February 2023, conversion therapy was banned nationwide.
Sri Lanka		Bill proposed to ban treatment	In March 2022, a bill aimed at banning conversion therapy was tabled by Samagi Jana Balawegaya MP Rohini Kumari Wijerathna. Wijerathna criticized the government for not supporting the bill in July 2024.
Switzerland	Treatment banned	Bill proposed to ban treatment Treatment banned in some jurisdictions	Practice by medical professionals banned: In Switzerland, it is unlawful for a medical professional to carry out conversion therapy. In 2016, the Swiss Federal Council wrote in response to a parliamentary interpellation that in its view, conversion therapies are "ineffective and cause significant suffering to young people subject to them", and would constitute a breach of professional duties on the part of any care professional undertaking them. As such, in the Government's view, any care professional undertaking such therapies is liable to be sanctioned by the cantonal authorities. Whether such therapies also constitute a criminal offense is to be determined by the criminal courts in the individual case, according to the Federal Council. Reports emerged in summer 2018 of a therapist claiming to be able to "cure" homosexuality through homoeopathy. He was promptly fired, and an investigation was opened with the Geneva Ministry of Health. According to the Ministry, believing that homosexuality is an illness is sufficient to open an investigation. The Association des Médecins du Canton de Genève describes conversion therapy as a form of charlatanism. In August 2022, the National Council's Legal Committee voted to call on the Federal Council to draft a law that would ban conversion therapy practices on minors and young adults. In May 2023, the canton of Neuchâtel became the first to pass a law banning conversion therapy, while Valais and Vaud followed in 2024. Additionally the cantons of Bern, Basel-Stadt, Geneva, Jura, Fribourg, and Schaffhausen have debated banning conversion therapy in their Parliaments.
Taiwan	Treatment banned		Practice by medical professionals banned: On 13 May 2016, the Health Bureau of the Taichung City Government announced that medical institutions in Taichung are prohibited from engaging in conversion therapy. According to Shader Liu, a member of Taichung's Gender Equality Committee, any group—medical, civil or religious—that practices the treatment is violating the Taiwanese Physicians Act and Psychologists Act. Regulations banning conversion therapy were expected to bypass Parliament in late January 2017 and take effect in March 2017. According to the Physicians Act, doctors who engage in prohibited treatments are subject to fines of between NT$100,000 (US$3,095) to NT$500,000 (US$15,850) and may be suspended for one month to one year. However, the proposed regulations were stalled by fierce resistance from anti-LGBT groups. Instead of pushing ahead legal amendments or new regulations, on 22 February 2018, the Ministry of Health and Welfare issued a letter to all local health authorities on the matter, which effectively banned conversion 'therapy'. In the letter, the Ministry states that sexual orientation conversion is not regarded as a legitimate healthcare practice and that any individual performing the so-called therapy is liable to prosecution under the Criminal Code or the Protection of Children and Youths Welfare and Rights Act, depending on the circumstances.
Uganda		Endorsed	Legal and state-backed: Section 16 of the Anti-Homosexuality Act, 2023 gives Ugandan courts the power to force a person convicted of homosexuality to undergo "rehabilitation".
United Kingdom		Bill proposed to ban treatment	Banned in the Isle of Man. Legislation pending in England and Wales, Scotland and Northern Ireland. In 2017, the Church of England announced it considers conversion therapy "fundamentally wrong" and demanded the Government ban it. After reports of a Liverpool church starving individuals for three days as a means to "cure" their homosexuality, Parliament heard calls for a legislative ban. Groups such as Stonewall and Humanists UK have also long called for it to be banned. On 3 July 2018, the UK Government announced it would work towards a total ban on conversion therapy across medical, non-medical, and religious settings. However, by the time of the 2019 general election, the issue was no longer a priority for the governing Conservative Party. Stonewall notes that "in the UK, all major counselling and psychotherapy bodies, as well as the NHS, have concluded that conversion therapy is dangerous and have condemned it by signing a Memorandum of Understanding". In December 2020, the Conservative Party again changed course and provided government funding for a conference of faith leaders calling for an end to conversion therapy, including nine archbishops, sixty rabbis and senior Buddhists, Hindus, Muslims and Sikhs. In the self-governing British dependent territory the Isle of Man, an amendment to the Sexual Offences and Obscene Publications Bill that would ban and criminalize gay conversion therapy was put forward to the House of Keys in 2019. The legislation was passed in 2020 and came into effect in March 2024, making the Isle of Man the first British territory to ban the practice. On 11 May 2021 the government stated that conversion therapy was to become a banned practice throughout England and Wales. In December 2021 the government put forward a proposed ban for consultation, with the stated intention of preparing a draft bill for spring 2022. In April 2022, days after announcing that the ban would not go ahead the government reversed that decision but said that it would not cover transgender people. In January 2023, the government changed its decision not to include transgender people. They would be covered by the ban. By early 2024, the proposed conversion therapy ban was alleged to have been cancelled by the government. In July 2024, the newly elected Labour government vowed to introduce a trans-inclusive ban on conversion therapy. On 17 July 2024, plans to outlaw conversion therapy in England and Wales were set forth in The King's Speech. In June 2026, the government published a draft Conversion Practices Bill for pre-legislative scrutiny.
United States		Treatment banned in some jurisdictions	Main article: Conversion therapy in the United States Banned in 23 states, 2 territories, and local counties/municipalities: As of September 2024, 23 U.S. states, the District of Columbia, Puerto Rico, and some counties and municipalities in the United States have passed laws banning the practice of conversion therapy on minors. It is also banned in major cities like Miami and Cincinnati. Subsequently, legal challenges against New Jersey's and California's conversion therapy bans were filed. U.S. District Court Judge Freda L. Wolfson rejected the claim of New Jersey parents that it violated their rights by keeping them from treating their child for same-sex attraction. In Doe v. Christie, Wolfson wrote: "Surely, the fundamental rights of parents do not include the right to choose a specific medical or mental health treatment that the state has reasonably deemed harmful or ineffective. ... To find otherwise would create unimaginable and unintentional consequences." On 10 February 2015, a New Jersey Superior Court judge ruled that offering conversion services on the basis of a description of homosexuality as abnormal or a mental illness is a violation of the New Jersey Consumer Fraud Act. The decision is "believed to be the first of its kind in the U.S." On 29 August 2013, in the case of Pickup v. Brown and Welch v. Brown, the U.S. Court of Appeals for the Ninth Circuit upheld California's ban. In August 2016, the Ninth Circuit again upheld the state's ban, finding that legislation prohibiting conversion therapy is not unconstitutional. The U.S. Supreme Court declined to hear an appeal against the case. The states of New Jersey (2013), California (2013), Oregon (2015), Illinois (2016), Vermont (2016), New Mexico (2017), Connecticut (2017), Rhode Island (2017), Nevada (2018), Washington (2018), Hawaii (2018), Delaware (2018), Maryland (2018), New Hampshire (2019), New York (2019), Massachusetts (2019), Maine (2019), Colorado (2019), Utah (2019), Virginia (2020), Minnesota (2023), Michigan (2023) and Kentucky (2024), as well as the District of Columbia (2015) and Puerto Rico (2019) ban the use of conversion therapy on minors. Arizona, North Carolina, Pennsylvania, and Wisconsin also prohibit use of state or federal funds for conversion therapy practices. In the 2020s, conversion therapy bans began to face increasing legal scrutiny amid a wider anti-LGBTQ movement in the United States. In 2020, the Eleventh Circuit struck down a conversion therapy ban in Palm Beach County, Florida, arguing that it violated practitioners' rights to freedom of speech under the First Amendment. In 2026, the Supreme Court ruled in ruled in Chiles v. Salazar that a lower court case upholding Colorado's ban must be reviewed with strict scrutiny, arguing that portions pertaining to talk therapy constituted the regulation of speech based on viewpoints. Opinion polls have found that conversion therapy bans enjoy popular support among the U.S. population. As of 2019, no nationwide opinion poll has been carried out, though surveys in three states (Florida, New Mexico and Virginia) show support varying between 60% and 75%. According to a 2014 national poll, only 8% of the U.S. population believed conversion therapies to be successful.
Uruguay	Diagnosis banned		Diagnosis by medical professionals banned: Adopted in 2017, the Ley de Salud Mental ("Mental Health Law") states that in no case a diagnosis can be made in the field of mental health on the exclusive basis of sexual orientation and gender identity.
Vietnam	Treatment banned		Practice by medical professionals banned: Circular No. 4132/BYT-PC, issued on 3 August 2022, stated that: "LGBTQ identity cannot be treated as a disease, while involuntary treatments are prohibited and mental health services can only be provided by experts on sexual orientation and gender identity."
Legend:		= banned; = endorsed/no ban; = in some jurisdictions; = for minors; = bill proposed.	

=== Legal status by US state ===
Although no national ban exists, several US states and individual counties ban therapy attempting to change sexual orientation as shown in the map below.

Map of U.S. states and counties that have bans on sexual orientation and gender identity change efforts with minors as of May 2024: Ban on conversion therapy for minors on the basis of sexual orientation and gender identity (Washington, D.C. also bans such therapy for adults.) Ban on use of state or federal funds for conversion therapy for minors on the basis of sexual orientation and gender identity State law prohibits local governments from banning conversion therapy Federal court has ruled that banning conversion therapy is unconstitutional; Dark red spots indicate cities/counties that had existing bans No ban on conversion therapy for minors

== Criminalization chronology ==
The table below lists, in chronological order, the United Nations member states that have explicitly prohibited and criminalized conversion therapy by law.

Year banned	Country	Countries per year	Total
2014	Ecuador	1	1
2016	Malta	1	2
2020	Germany	1	3
2022	Canada; France; Greece; New Zealand	4	7
2023	Spain; Cyprus; Iceland; Belgium	4	11
2024	Norway; Portugal; Mexico	3	14
2026	Netherlands	1	15

== Legal cases ==
In 1993, the Superior Court of San Francisco's Family Court placed 15-year-old lesbian Lyn Duff under the guardianship of a foster couple after her mother committed her to Rivendell Psychiatric Center in West Jordan, Utah, where she allegedly endured physical abuse under the guise of conversion therapy. Lyn Duff's petition to leave her mother was granted without court opinion.

In 1997, the United States Court of Appeals for the Ninth Circuit addressed conversion therapy in the context of an asylum application. A Russian citizen "had been apprehended by the Russian militia, registered at a clinic as a 'suspected lesbian', and forced to undergo treatment for lesbianism, such as 'sedative drugs' and hypnosis. ... The Ninth Circuit held that the conversion treatments to which Pitcherskaia had been subjected constituted mental and physical torture." The court rejected the argument that the treatments to which Pitcherskaia had been subjected did not constitute persecution because they had been intended to help her, not harm her, and stated "human rights laws cannot be sidestepped by simply couching actions that torture mentally or physically in benevolent terms such as 'curing' or 'treating' the victims".

On 25 June 2015, a New Jersey jury found the Jewish conversion therapy organization JONAH guilty of consumer fraud in the case Ferguson v. JONAH for promising to be able to change its clients' sexual urges. The jury determined its commercial practices to be unconscionable.
