= Youth Mental Health Protection Act =

Illinois law

This 2014 map shows districts that banned conversion therapy practices. As of 2021, only 20 states and D.C. have fully outlawed conversion therapies for minors.

The Youth Mental Health Protection Act, H.B. 217, is an Illinois bill that prohibits mental health professionals from implementing conversion therapy, reparative therapy, or sexual orientation change efforts on patients under the age of eighteen. Additionally, the bill outlaws any promotional materials from deceiving consumers and falsely representing homosexuality as a mental health defect in any manner. The goal of the legislation is to protect minors from undue stress and further stigmatization as a result of their sexuality.

The bill was initially filed by Representative Kelly M. Cassidy and was passed during the Illinois 99th Regular Legislative Session on May 29, 2015. Governor Bruce Rauner approved the act on August 20, 2015 and became effective on January 1, 2016. Illinois was the fourth state in the United States to pass legislation protecting LGBT+ youth from such therapies.

== National background ==
=== Leelah Alcorn's petition ===
April 8, 2015, during President Barack Obama's second term, a statement was posted to the White House website in response to a petition calling for a national ban of conversion therapy, referred to as "Leelah's Law." The petition was started on January 3, 2015, and garnered over 100,000 signatures calling for the federal government to pass legislation to shield the LGBT+ youth from such therapies and any related trauma or stigmatization. The initiative began in response to death of Leelah Alcorn, a 17-year-old transgender youth, who died by suicide. On the petition's overview, the sponsor writes that Alcorn's parents had "forced her to attend conversion therapy," which only further isolated the teen.

The White House's statement emphasizes the Administration's support of LGBT+ youth, and stands against conversion therapy, but calls on states to institute legislation. The statement refrains from calling on Congress directly to advance such efforts.

=== Mike Pence ===
In the 2016 presidential election, Indiana Governor Mike Pence was chosen to be Donald Trump's running mate. This decision was opposed by many LGBT+ advocates, as Pence has a history of voting against inclusive legislation. During the campaign, accusations that he supported conversion therapies spread. While denying the accusations, previous statements suggest Pence believes such practices are effective and should continue to be implemented by religious leaders.

== History ==
In the mid-19th century, the United States moved towards a pathological perspective on homosexuality, believing the same-sex attraction took place as a result of a mental disorder. At this time, the people an individual had sexual relationships with were conceptualized in terms of isolated behavior, not as an identity, as we use today (i.e. being gay or bisexual was not how one would self-identity).

Later, into the mid-20th century, this pathological understanding of LGBT+ people continued with the inclusion of homosexuality in the first publication of the DSM in 1952 by the American Psychiatric Association. Defining homosexuality as a behavior allowed for a more clear condition of identifiable individuals. This categorization of people facilitated the attempts by medical professionals to "cure" same-sex attraction, particularly through conversion therapy. These conversion practices often included surgical operations, electroconvulsive therapy, and other aversion therapy methods.

While pathological views of LGBT+ identities have evolved, these ideas still permeate many elements of American culture, specifically within the legal code. Below is a table demonstrating this expansion of laws protecting queer people in Illinois, leading up to the ban of conversion therapy.

Year	Illinois law protecting LGBT+ people
January 1, 1962	Illinois became the first state to decriminalize homosexuality.
December 21, 1988	Cook County Human Rights Ordinance, granting LGBT+ people "social equality under the law"
January 1, 2006	Illinois Human Rights Act moves to include LGBT+ people with other defending identities against discrimination and sexual harassment in the workplace, school and other public resources. Illinois was the 15th state to protect gay, lesbian, and bisexual people, and the 5th to protect transgender people.
June 1, 2011	Illinois Religious Freedom Protection and Civil Union Act allows same-sex couples to successfully file for civil unions.
June 1, 2014	Same-sex marriages are legally recognized by the state of Illinois. Signed into law by Governor Pat Quinn on November 20, 2013.
January 1, 2016	Illinois' Youth Mental Health Protection Act goes into effect. Law prevents mental health practitioners from utilizing conversion therapy practices and bans "trade and commerce" that portrays LGBT+ identities as mental defect or deficit.

== Support and opposition ==
Overwhelming support for the act came in the form of 117 witness slips filed in support of the act, outweighing the 25 for the opposition. In Illinois, witness slips are used by the legislature to better understand the position of the community. In this case, these slips were filed by survivors of conversion therapy, concerned people, business-owners, doctors, nurses, a wide variety of mental health professionals, and Illinois-based LGBT+ organizations. These organizations include Equality Illinois, PFLAG Chapters in Illinois, AIDS Foundation of Chicago, Equality Illinois, Peoria Proud, the National Center for Lesbian Rights, and more.

The bill itself outlined several areas of scholarship in mental and pediatric health care from 1993 to 2012 that have provided widely replicated statistics against the use of conversion therapies. Specifically, the bill emphasizes the consistent opinion that conversion therapies for a minor present “critical health risks” to the child, including, but not limited to depression, anxiety, self-harm, risky sexual behavior. These data are replicated across studies from the American Psychological Association, American Psychiatric Association and American Association of Social Workers.

Opposition for the bill was predominantly rooted in the religious implications of the law. One main organization that displayed such opposition was the Illinois Family Institute; representatives and associates of the group filed a total of 11 out of the 25 witness slips against the bill. Additionally, the organization published on its website a statement against the bill from a local law firm, discussing the implications for practitioners and pastors who utilize such treatments to “counsel minors on how to cope with or overcome unwanted same-sex attraction.” The statement also includes advertisements of resources for joining legal action to challenge the bill.

Pastors Protecting Youth et al., v. Lisa Madigan (2017) is a federal court case brought forth by an organization of pastors who believe the law should not apply to clergy members. Here, Pastors Protecting Youth and a coalition of other religious groups and individuals sued Lisa Madigan in her capacity as Illinois' Attorney General as a representative of the state. In the case, the pastors argued that the law violates the free speech rights of religious leaders. However, the court found in favor of Illinois, dismissing the case altogether under the logic that the group was misinterpreting the boundaries of the law, which applies only "in the conduct of any trade or commerce."

== See also ==
- List of U.S. jurisdictions banning conversion therapy
- LGBT history in the United States
- Illinois' Equality Map
- The Trevor Project
- Human Rights Campaign
- GLAAD
