= Conversion therapy in the United States =

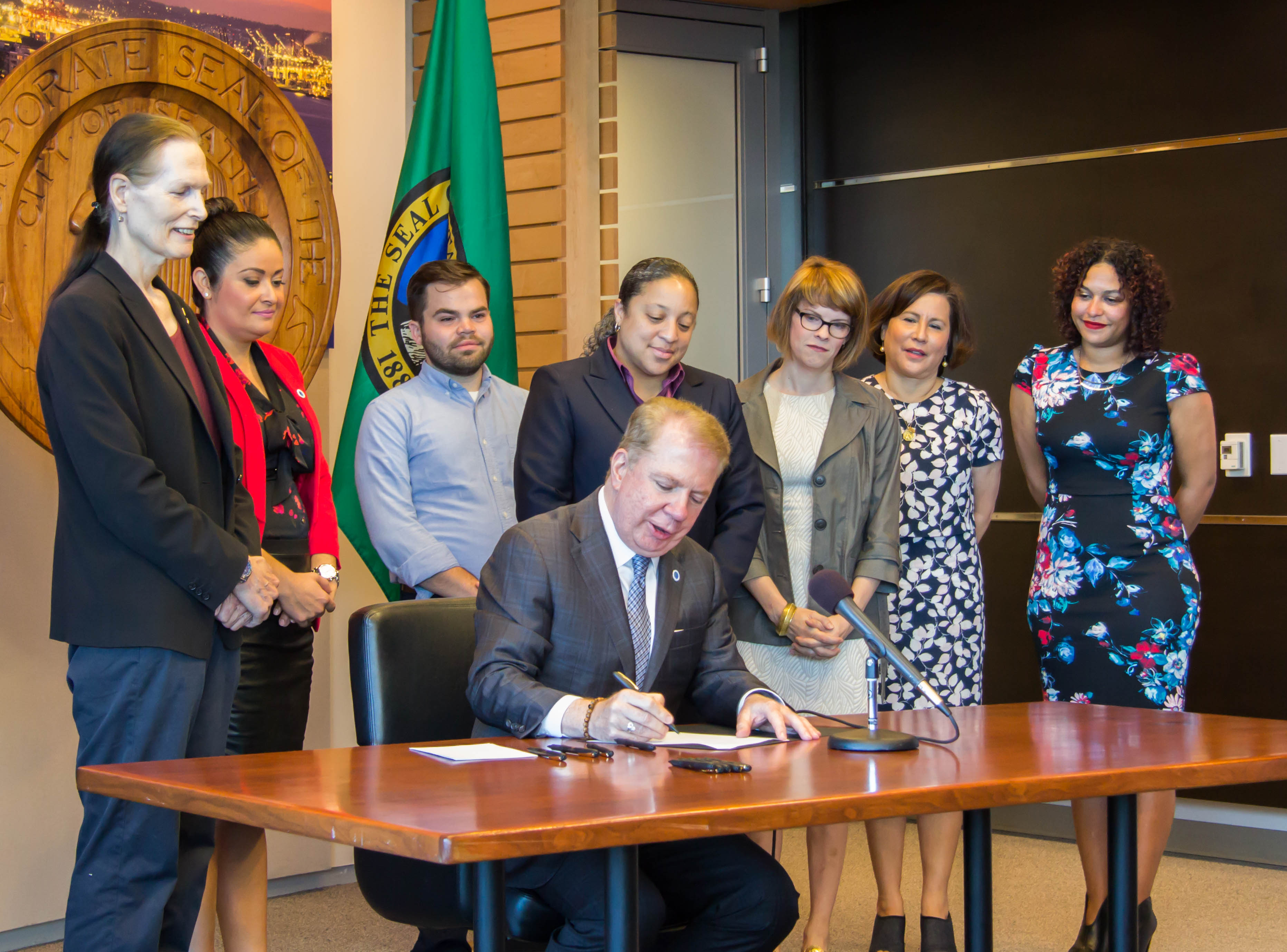
Murray in 2016

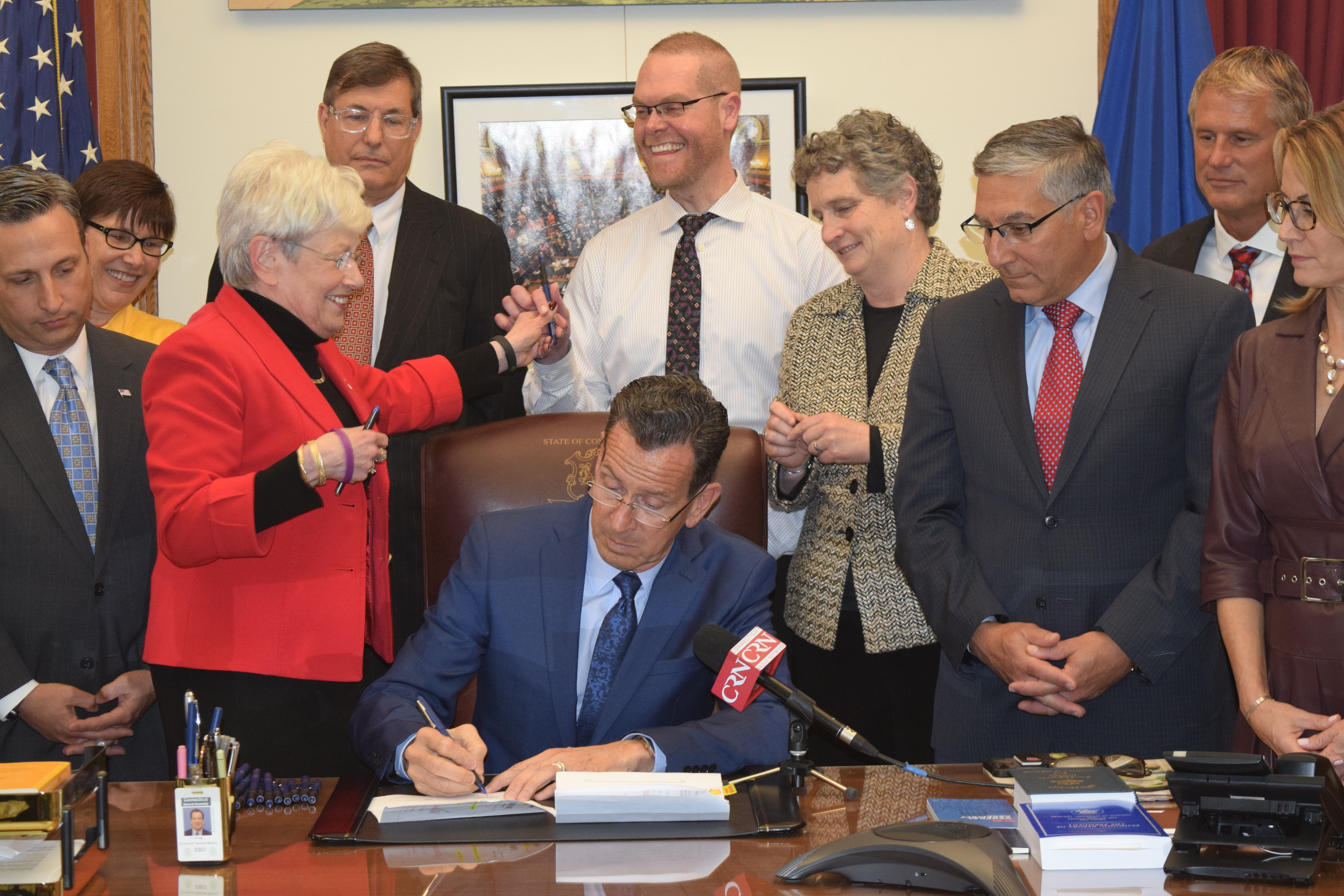
Malloy in 2017

Mayor Ed Murray and Governor Dannel Malloy signing legislation, banning the practice of conversion therapy on minor clients in Seattle and Connecticut, respectively.

Homosexuality was considered to be a mental disorder until 1973 when the American Psychiatric Association removed it from the list. Homosexuality was not completely erased from the Diagnostic and Statistical Manual of Mental Disorder; it was replaced with "Sexual Orientation Disturbance", which was amended in 1980 to only include people who were anxious or depressed about their sexual orientation. The mention of homosexuality was not removed until 1987. However, the criminalization of homosexuality continued until three decades later following the ruling of the Supreme Court in Lawrence V. Texas (2003). The ruling in this case was responsible for invalidating all remaining state laws against consensual same-sex activity. Despite the progress made in representing and guaranteeing the rights of queer communities within the legal field, there remains much to be done especially in regard to conversion therapy.

Conversion therapy is oftentimes referred to as "reparative" or "reorientation" therapy, and it is a pseudoscientific practice which aims to change a person's sexual orientation to heterosexual and/or their gender identity to align with the sex they were assigned at birth. This practice comes from the belief that being part of the queer community in any way is a form of mental illness that needs to be worked on and "cured." This approach has been proven to be ineffective and dangerous, oftentimes leading to harmful results like increased levels of depression and anxiety. Medical, psychological, and mental health organizations worldwide reject these practices and recognize both sexual orientation and gender identity as natural and healthy parts of one's identity.

A majority of the United States population live in jurisdictions that have banned conversion therapy—a family of widely debunked and abusive medical, spiritual and psychological practices that falsely claim to be able to change a person's sexual orientation, gender identity, or gender expression—on minors.

27 states, as well as the District of Columbia, Puerto Rico, and more than 100 municipalities have instituted bans on conversion therapy and its governmental funding, with penalties ranging from fines to imprisonment. The District of Columbia is the only U.S. jurisdiction whose ban also applies to adults. Three states ban the use of state and federal funds for conversion therapy on minors.

Surveys held in 2014 and 2020 found that a majority of Americans supported bans on conversion therapy for minors, and do not believe the practice was effective. A 2023 report by The Trevor Project found that there are over 1,300 active conversion therapists still operating in 48 U.S. states, with over 600 of these practitioners holding active professional licenses.

Conversion therapy bans involving talk therapy began to face legal challenges in the 2020s, under allegations that it constitutes protected speech under the First Amendment. In 2020, the Eleventh Circuit overturned conversion therapy bans in Florida, under the argument that upholding the bill could theoretically allow gender-affirming therapy to also be prohibited by jurisdictions in a similar fashion. In 2026, the Supreme Court ruled in Chiles v. Salazar that a ruling on Colorado's conversion therapy ban as applied to a plaintiff needed to be reviewed under strict scrutiny, as it considered regulation of talk therapy to be viewpoint discrimination.

== Methods ==
Methods utilized in conversion therapy vary depending on who is performing it; however, they all include forms of talk therapy through counseling and behavioral techniques. These methods are used to attempt to suppress non-heteronormative thoughts or attractions in order to make someone adhere with conservative views on attraction, gender norms and/or their biologically assigned sex at birth. Aversion therapy implicates exposing individuals to physically painful sensations while they are exposed to same sex attraction conversations or physical materials like pictures or videos. This is done to create negative and painful associations with same sex attraction and therefore attempt to deter the patients from partaking in it.

Similarly, faith-based approaches have been utilized in the past, where prayers and peer pressure are used to forced individuals into conversion therapy. These approaches reframe scripture in order to reinterpret a client's identity, relying on spiritual counsel to better "align life direction" with religious teachings. Faith is oftentimes used to justify identity change efforts such as conversion therapy; religious organizations oftentimes employ these religions techniques to get potential clients interested in other therapy methods such as the previously mentioned aversion therapy. Ferguson v. JONAH (2015) is oftentimes cited when it comes to conversion therapy within religious practices. The case is an example of a religious organization (Jews Offering New Alternatives for Healing) being accused and found responsible for conducting fraudulent treatment which promised to "convert individuals to heterosexuality."

== Implications ==
Protest against conversion therapy due to its lack of humanitarian approaches showcasing the negative implications of conversion therapy.

Sexual orientation is not something that has to be cured, and as many medical experts have pointed out, it cannot even be cured. Sexuality and gender identity are completely normal and healthy parts of life. Partaking in any manner of conversion therapy can lead to depression, anxiety, PTSD, substance abuse, and an increased risk of homelessness which can all in turn lead to a rise in suicide attempts. Likewise, it can also lead to a loss in community and have detrimental effects on people's relationships with their family and friends. Additionally, conversion therapy practices have been linked to poor long-term psychosocial health which can interrupt healthy aging making conversion therapy a classified sexual minority stressor which can and has contributed to psychosocial health inequality between those who have been subjected to it and those who have not.

== Historical laws ==
Map of U.S. cities and counties that had bans on sexual orientation and gender identity change efforts before March 31, 2026. Ban on conversion therapy for minors on the basis of sexual orientation and gender identity (Washington, D.C. also bans such therapy for adults.) Ban on use of state or federal funds for conversion therapy for minors on the basis of sexual orientation and gender identity State law prohibits local governments from banning conversion therapy Federal court has ruled that banning conversion therapy is unconstitutional; Dark red spots indicate cities/counties that had pre-existing bans No ban on conversion therapy for minors

Ban only applies to state and federal funding of conversion therapy on minors.

States with bans on conversion therapy for minor clients on the basis of sexual orientation and gender identity or expression
	State	Date of enactment	Date effective	Ban method	Details
1.	New Jersey	August 19, 2013	August 19, 2013	Legislative statute	On June 24, 2013, the New Jersey Assembly voted 56–14 in favor of AB 3371. On June 27, 2013, the New Jersey State Senate voted 28–9 to pass the bill. On August 19, 2013, Governor Chris Christie (R) signed the legislation into law, and it took effect the same day.
2.	California	September 30, 2012	August 29, 2013	Legislative statute	On May 30, 2012, the California State Senate voted 23–13 in favor of SB-1172. The California State Assembly voted 52–22 in favor of the bill on August 28, 2012. On September 30, 2012, Governor Jerry Brown (D) signed it into law, and it was scheduled to go into effect on January 1, 2013. On December 21, 2012, in the case of Welch v. Brown, Judge William B. Shubb granted a preliminary injunction to SB-1172 from going into effect. On August 29, 2013, in the case of Pickup v. Brown and Welch v. Brown, the United States Court of Appeals for the Ninth Circuit upheld SB-1172 and reversed the lower court order granting a preliminary injunction. On May 1, 2017, the Supreme Court rejected an appeal of the case.
3.	Oregon	May 18, 2015	May 18, 2015	Legislative statute	On March 17, 2015, the Oregon House of Representatives voted 41–18 in favor of HB 2307, and the Oregon State Senate voted 21–8 in favor of the bill on May 7, 2015. On May 18, 2015, Governor Kate Brown (D) signed the bill into law and it went into effect the same day.
4.	Illinois	August 20, 2015	January 1, 2016	Legislative statute	On May 19, 2015, the Illinois House of Representatives voted 68–43 in favor of HB 217. The bill passed the Illinois State Senate on May 29, 2015, by 34 votes to 19. On August 20, 2015, Governor Bruce Rauner (R) signed the legislation, and it went into effect on January 1, 2016.
5.	Vermont	May 25, 2016	July 1, 2016	Legislative statute	On March 17, 2016, the Vermont Senate unanimously approved S.132. On April 26, the Vermont House of Representatives approved it with amendments. The Senate concurred with the amendments on April 29. Governor Peter Shumlin (D) signed the bill on May 25. It went into effect on July 1.
6.	New Mexico	April 7, 2017	April 7, 2017	Legislative statute	The state Senate approved SB 121 on February 16, 2017, by a 32–6 vote, and the state House of Representatives concurred on March 15, 2017, by a 44–23 vote. The bill was signed by Governor Susana Martinez (R) on April 7, 2017. The law went into effect immediately.
7.	Connecticut	May 10, 2017	May 10, 2017	Legislative statute	The state House of Representatives approved HB 6695 on May 2, 2017, by a 141–8 vote, and the Senate concurred on May 10, 2017, by a 36–0 vote. The bill was signed by Governor Dannel Malloy (D) the same day and took effect immediately.
8.	Rhode Island	July 19, 2017	July 19, 2017	Legislative statute	H 5277 was passed by the state House 69–0 on May 30, 2017. The Senate approved the bill 29–0 on June 30. It was signed by Governor Gina Raimondo (D) on July 19, 2017, and took effect immediately.
9.	Nevada	May 17, 2017	January 1, 2018	Legislative statute	SB 201 was passed by the state Senate 15–5 on April 4, 2017, and by the Assembly 31–8 on May 9. The Senate concurred with the House's amendments on the same day. The bill was signed by Governor Brian Sandoval (R) on May 17, 2017, and went into effect on January 1, 2018.
10.	Washington	March 28, 2018	June 7, 2018	Legislative statute	SB 5722 passed the state Senate 32–16 on January 19, 2018, and the state House 66–32 on February 28. After the Senate concurred with the amended House version on March 3, it was signed by Governor Jay Inslee (D) on March 28, 2018. It took effect on June 7, 2018.
11.	Hawaii	May 25, 2018	July 1, 2018	Legislative statute	SB 270 passed the state Senate on March 6, 2018, by a vote of 24–1, and passed the state House of Representatives on April 10, 2018, by a vote of 49–2. A conference committee of both chambers concluded on April 27, 2018, with an amended bill. It was approved by both chambers on May 1, and was signed by Governor David Ige (D) on May 25, 2018. The law took effect on July 1, 2018.
12.	Delaware	July 23, 2018	July 23, 2018	Legislative statute	SB 65 passed the state Senate by a vote of 12–3 on May 17, 2017, and the state House on June 7, 2018, by a vote of 24–14. The bill was signed by Governor John Carney (D) on July 23, 2018, and took effect immediately.
13.	Maryland	May 15, 2018	October 1, 2018	Legislative statute	SB 1028 passed the state Senate on March 27, 2018, by a vote of 34–12, and the state House on April 4, 2018, by a vote of 95–27. The bill was signed by Governor Larry Hogan (R) on May 15, 2018, and went into effect on October 1, 2018.
14.	New Hampshire	June 8, 2018	January 1, 2019	Legislative statute	HB 587 passed the state House on February 8, 2018, by a vote of 179–171, and the state Senate on April 19, 2018, by a vote of 14–10, with an amendment. The House accepted the Senate's amendment on May 10, 2018. It was signed by Governor Chris Sununu (R) on June 8, 2018, and took effect on January 1, 2019.
15.	New York	January 25, 2019	January 25, 2019	Legislative statute	A576 passed the state Assembly on January 15, 2019, by a vote of 134–3, and passed the state Senate that same day by a vote of 57–4. The bill was signed by Governor Andrew Cuomo (D) on January 25, 2019, and took effect immediately upon receiving his signature. Since 2016, conversion therapy has been banned in New York from coverage by insurers and Medicaid, or from being practiced by any state-licensed or operated mental health facility per executive order.
16.	Massachusetts	April 8, 2019	April 8, 2019	Legislative statute	H140 was passed in the Massachusetts House of Representatives by a vote of 147–8 on March 13, 2019, and in the state Senate by a vote of 34–0 on March 28, 2019. Governor Charlie Baker (R) signed the legislation into law on April 8, 2019. The law prohibits licensed health care providers from practicing conversion therapy on minors within the state.
17.	Colorado	May 31, 2019	August 2, 2019	Legislative statute	On February 19, 2019, the Colorado House of Representatives passed HB19-1129, which would ban conversion therapy on minors, with a vote of 42–20. It was approved by the state Senate with amendments by a vote of 21–13 on March 25, 2019. The House concurred with the amendments on April 5, 2019. The bill was signed by Governor Jared Polis (D) on May 31, and took effect 90 days after adjournment of the legislative session. The Supreme Court of the United States has ruled against this law with an 8-1 ratio on March 31, 2026, saying lower courts had "erred by failing to apply sufficiently rigorous scrutiny" to restrictions on free speech.
18.	Maine	May 29, 2019	September 17, 2019	Legislative statute	On May 8, 2019, the Maine House of Representatives passed LD 1025, which would ban conversion therapy on minors, with a vote of 91–46. It later passed in the Maine Senate on May 21, 2019, by a vote of 25–9. Governor Janet Mills (D) signed the legislation into law on May 29, 2019. The law prohibits licensed health care providers from practicing conversion therapy on minors within the state, and took effect 90 days after the adjournment of the legislative session. A bill that previously passed the Maine Legislature in June 2018 was vetoed by former Governor Paul LePage the following month and failed to survive a veto override attempt.
19.	North Carolina	August 2, 2019	August 2, 2019	Executive order	On August 2, 2019, North Carolina Governor Roy Cooper (D) signed an executive order banning any state funding of conversion therapy on minors.
20.	Utah	January 21, 2020	January 21, 2020	Executive order and legislative statute	After a bill to ban conversion therapy on minors failed to pass the Utah Senate, Governor Gary Herbert (R) signed an executive order prohibiting conversion therapy on minors by regulation on January 21, 2020. In February 2023, a bill formally passed both houses of the Utah Legislature to "codify" the ban on conversion therapy on LGBT minors into legislation. The Governor of Utah signed the bill into law - effective immediately, a month later in March 2023.
21.	Virginia	March 2, 2020	July 1, 2020	Legislative statute	On February 3, 2020, the House of Delegates passed HB 386, which would ban conversion therapy on minors, with a vote of 66–27. It was approved by the state Senate on February 17, in a vote of 22–18. Governor Ralph Northam (D) signed the legislation into law on March 2, 2020, and it took effect on July 1, 2020. In June 2025, Attorney General Jason Miyares entered into a consent decree to not enforce the ban on talk conversion therapy.
22.	Wisconsin	June 1, 2021	June 1, 2021	Executive order	On June 1, 2021, Wisconsin Governor Tony Evers (D) signed an executive order disallowing state and federal funds to be allocated by the Department of Health Services, the Department of Children and Families, and the Department of Corrections to conversion therapy. Earlier that year, lawmakers in the Wisconsin Legislature had moved to protect the practice.
23.	Michigan	June 14, 2021	June 14, 2021	Executive order and legislative statute	On June 14, 2021, Michigan Governor Gretchen Whitmer (D) signed an executive order prohibiting the use of state or federal funds for conversion therapy on minors. On June 28, 2023, the Michigan legislature sent a bill to ban the use of conversion therapy on minors to Governor Whitmer. Whitmer signed the bill on July 26, 2023.
24.	North Dakota	July 8, 2021	July 8, 2021	Regulatory Action	The members of the Administrative Rules Committee voted 8–7 on Tuesday, June 8, to authorize the prohibition proposed by the North Dakota Board of Social Work Examiners, which oversees licensing for social workers in the state.
25.	Minnesota	July 15, 2021	July 15, 2021	Executive order and legislative statute	Following a legislative attempt at a ban being stripped from the budget bill, Governor Tim Walz (D) signed an executive order prohibiting conversion therapy on minors by regulation on July 19, 2021. In April 2023, the Minnesota Legislature formally passed a bill to codify and implement to legally ban conversion therapy practices on minors and vulnerable adults, and it was signed into law on April 27, 2023. The law will go into effect on August 1.
26.	Pennsylvania	August 16, 2022	August 16, 2022	Executive order	On August 16, 2022, Governor Tom Wolf (D) signed an executive order prohibiting the use of state funds for conversion therapy on minors. In May 2024, five licensing boards agreed to resolutions barring the use of conversion therapy.
27.	Arizona	June 27, 2023	June 27, 2023	Executive order	On June 27, 2023, Governor Katie Hobbs (D) signed an executive order prohibiting the use of state funds for conversion therapy on minors.

== Territories ==
Territories with bans on conversion therapy on the basis of sexual orientation and gender identity or expression
	Territory	Date of enactment	Date effective	Ban method	Details
1.	District of Columbia	December 22, 2014	March 11, 2015	Legislative statute	On December 2, 2014, the Council of the District of Columbia voted unanimously (12 ayes) in favor of B20-0501. On December 22, 2014, Mayor Vincent C. Gray (D) signed the legislation into law. The act passed congressional review and took effect on March 11, 2015. On January 16, 2019, Mayor Muriel Bowser (D) signed B22-0972, a bill approved unanimously by the City Council extending the ban to adults who are under the care of a conservator or guardian. The law went into effect on March 13, 2019.
2.	Puerto Rico	March 27, 2019	March 27, 2019	Executive order	On March 27, 2019, Governor Ricardo Rosselló (PNP) issued an executive order prohibiting conversion therapy of minors, taking effect immediately. Territorial agencies were provided 90 days for promulgation of the new order.

== Counties, municipalities and communities ==
Ban suspended under a decision by the 11th Circuit Court of Appeals.
Vote pending

Counties, municipalities and communities with bans on conversion therapy for minors on the basis of sexual orientation and gender identity or expression
	County, municipality or community	Date of enactment	Date effective	Ban method	Details
1.	Cincinnati, Ohio	December 9, 2015	January 9, 2016	Ordinance	On December 9, 2015, the Cincinnati City Council voted 7–2 in favor of Ordinance 373 and it went into effect on January 9, 2016.
2.	Miami Beach, Florida	June 8, 2016	June 18, 2016	Ordinance	On June 8, 2016, Miami Beach voted to ban conversion therapy. The ban was sponsored by Commissioner John Elizabeth Alemàn and was unanimously approved by the City Commission. The ban took effect on June 18.
3.	Wilton Manors, Florida	September 13, 2016	September 13, 2016	Ordinance	On September 13, 2016, the City Commission of Wilton Manors unanimously approved an ordinance banning conversion therapy. The ban took effect that same day.
4.	Seattle, Washington	August 1, 2016	October 2, 2016	Ordinance	On August 1, 2016, the Seattle City Council voted to ban conversion therapy on minors. The ban was sponsored by councilmember Lorena González and was unanimously approved by all other eight city councilmembers. Mayor Ed Murray signed the ordinance on August 3 and it took effect on October 2.
5.	Miami, Florida	October 13, 2016	October 13, 2016	Ordinance	On October 13, 2016, the Miami City Commission voted 3–2 in favor of banning the use of conversion therapy on minors. The ban was sponsored by Commissioner Francis Suarez, and took effect that same day that it was ratified.
6.	West Palm Beach, Florida	November 7, 2016	November 7, 2016	Ordinance	On November 7, 2016, the City Commission of West Palm Beach unanimously approved an ordinance in its second reading banning conversion therapy. The ban took effect upon adoption.
7.	Bay Harbor Islands, Florida	November 14, 2016	November 14, 2016	Ordinance	On November 14, 2016, the Bay Harbor Islands Town Council approved an ordinance banning conversion therapy. The ordinance came into effect that same day.
8.	Pittsburgh, Pennsylvania	December 13, 2016	December 20, 2016	Ordinance	The Pittsburgh City Council voted in favor of an ordinance prohibiting conversion therapy on minors, by a vote of 9–0, on December 13, 2016. The ordinance went into effect on December 20, following Mayor Bill Peduto's signature.
9.	Boynton Beach, Florida	January 17, 2017	January 17, 2017	Ordinance	On January 3, 2017, an ordinance banning conversion therapy in Boynton Beach passed its first reading. The ordinance passed its second reading on January 17 and went into effect immediately.
10.	Lake Worth, Florida	January 10, 2017	January 20, 2017	Ordinance	On December 13, 2016, the Lake Worth City Commission unanimously passed an ordinance banning conversion therapy on minors, in its first reading. The ordinance passed its second reading, in a 5–0 vote, on January 10, 2017, and went into effect on January 20.
11.	El Portal, Florida	January 24, 2017	January 24, 2017	Ordinance	An ordinance banning conversion therapy passed its first reading in the El Portal Village Council in October 2016. The ordinance passed its second reading on January 24 and went into effect that same day.
12.	Toledo, Ohio	February 7, 2017	February 7, 2017	Ordinance	An ordinance banning conversion therapy was unanimously (12–0) approved by the Toledo City Council on February 7, 2017.
13.	Key West, Florida	March 7, 2017	March 7, 2017	Ordinance	On February 8, 2017, the Key West City Commission approved an ordinance banning conversion therapy, in its first reading. The ordinance passed its second reading on March 7 and took effect immediately.
14.	North Bay Village, Florida	March 14, 2017	March 14, 2017	Ordinance	On March 14, 2017, the Commission of North Bay Village voted to ban conversion therapy. The ban took effect immediately upon adoption.
15.	Columbus, Ohio	March 27, 2017	March 27, 2017	Ordinance	On March 13, the City Council of Columbus approved an ordinance, banning the use of conversion therapy on minors, in its first reading. The ordinance was introduced by Council President Zach Klein. It unanimously passed its second reading on March 27 and took effect immediately.
16.	Tampa, Florida	April 6, 2017	April 6, 2017	Ordinance	On April 6, the Tampa City Council unanimously approved a conversion therapy ban. The ban went into effect immediately. This ordinance was struck down by a federal court in October 2019.
17.	Delray Beach, Florida	May 2, 2017	May 2, 2017	Ordinance	On April 18, 2017, the Delray Beach City Commission approved an ordinance banning conversion therapy, in its first reading. The ordinance unanimously passed its second reading in the City Commission on May 2. The ban took effect immediately.
18.	Riviera Beach, Florida	May 4, 2017	May 4, 2017	Ordinance	The Riviera Beach City Council unanimously approved a conversion therapy ban on May 4. The ban went into effect that same day.
19.	Wellington, Florida	June 27, 2017	June 27, 2017	Ordinance	On June 27, 2017, the Wellington Village Council approved an ordinance banning conversion therapy, in its second reading. The ban took effect immediately.
20.	Dayton, Ohio	July 5, 2017	July 5, 2017	Ordinance	On June 28, 2017, the Dayton City Council passed an ordinance banning conversion therapy. The ordinance passed its second reading on July 5 and went into force immediately.
21.	Philadelphia, Pennsylvania	July 11, 2017	July 11, 2017	Ordinance	On June 22, 2017, the Philadelphia City Council approved an ordinance banning conversion therapy. It was signed by Mayor Jim Kenney on July 11, 2017. The ordinance went into effect immediately.
22.	Allentown, Pennsylvania	July 20, 2017	July 20, 2017	Ordinance	On July 19, 2017, the Allentown City Council approved an ordinance banning conversion therapy. It was signed by Mayor Ed Pawlowski the next day. The ordinance went into effect immediately.
23.	Greenacres, Florida	August 7, 2017	August 7, 2017	Ordinance	On August 7, 2017, the Greenacres City Council approved an ordinance banning conversion therapy, in a 4–1 vote. The ordinance took effect immediately.
24.	Athens, Ohio	August 21, 2017	August 21, 2017	Ordinance	On August 21, 2017, the Athens City Council unanimously approved an ordinance banning conversion therapy within city limits. The ordinance went into effect immediately.
25.	Pima County, Arizona	August 1, 2017	August 31, 2017	Ordinance	The Pima County Board of Supervisors passed, in a 3–2 vote, an ordinance banning conversion therapy. The ordinance went into effect 30 days later, upon filing with the Arizona Department of State.
26.	Boca Raton, Florida	October 10, 2017	October 10, 2017	Ordinance	The Boca Raton City Council voted 4–1 to enact an ordinance banning conversion therapy on October 10, 2017. The ordinance went into effect immediately.
27.	Oakland Park, Florida	October 18, 2017	October 18, 2017	Ordinance	The City Commission of Oakland Park approved a conversion therapy ban on October 18, 2017, in a unanimous 4–0 vote. The ordinance went into force upon adoption.
28.	Palm Beach County, Florida	December 19, 2017	December 21, 2017	Ordinance	On December 19, 2017, the Palm Beach County Board of Commissioners approved, in a 5–2 vote, an ordinance banning conversion therapy. The ordinance applies to all incorporated and unincorporated municipalities in the county. It took effect upon filing with the Florida Department of State on December 21, 2017.
29.	Reading, Pennsylvania	December 21, 2017	December 21, 2017	Ordinance	The Reading City Council approved a conversion therapy ban on December 18, 2017, in a unanimous vote. It was signed by Mayor Wally Scott on December 21, 2017. The ordinance went into force upon adoption.
30.	Doylestown, Pennsylvania	December 18, 2017	December 23, 2017	Ordinance	The Borough Council of Doylestown passed (7–1) a conversion therapy ban on December 18, 2017. It came into effect five days later.
31.	Broward County, Florida	January 9, 2018	January 9, 2018	Ordinance	On January 9, 2018, the Broward County Commission approved unanimously an ordinance banning conversion therapy. The ordinance took effect upon filing with the Florida Department of State, which happened that same day.
32.	State College, Pennsylvania	February 5, 2018	February 5, 2018	Ordinance	On February 5, 2018, the Borough Council of State College approved unanimously an ordinance banning conversion therapy.
33.	Erie County, New York	February 15, 2018	March 7, 2018	Ordinance	The Erie County Legislature unanimously approved a conversion therapy ban on February 15, 2018. The ordinance was controversially named the "Prevention of Emotional Neglect and Childhood Endangerment" (P.E.N.C.E) after Vice President Mike Pence. After County Executive Mark Poloncarz had provided his signature on March 5, the law went into effect upon filing with the New York Department of State on March 7, 2018.
34.	Yardley, Pennsylvania	March 6, 2018	March 11, 2018	Ordinance	On March 6, the Yardley Borough Council unanimously approved an anti-discrimination ordinance banning discrimination on the basis of sexual orientation and gender identity and prohibiting conversion therapy on minors. The ordinance went into force five days later.
35.	Gainesville, Florida	April 5, 2018	April 5, 2018	Ordinance	On April 5, 2018, the Gainesville City Commission unanimously approved a conversion therapy ordinance. It went into effect immediately.
36.	Milwaukee, Wisconsin	April 4, 2018	April 14, 2018	Ordinance	On March 27, 2018, the Milwaukee Common Council passed (12–2) a conversion therapy ordinance banning the practice in the city of Milwaukee. Mayor Tom Barrett signed the ordinance into law on April 4, and it went into effect 10 days later.
37.	New York City, New York	January 5, 2018	May 5, 2018	Ordinance	In June 2017, a bill to ban conversion therapy was introduced to the New York City Council. The City Council passed (43–2) the ban on November 30. Mayor Bill de Blasio returned the bill unsigned on January 5, thus allowing it to become law. It went into effect 120 days later. The ban applies to minors as well as adults. In September 2019, following a lawsuit by an anti-LGBT hate group, Alliance Defending Freedom, the City Council moved to repeal the ban on conversion therapy for adults, citing how a ruling by the Second Circuit or the conservative Supreme Court could damage efforts against the practice nationwide.
38.	Albany, New York	May 21, 2018	May 21, 2018	Ordinance	On May 21, 2018, an ordinance to ban conversion therapy was unanimously approved by the city's Common Council. The ordinance went into effect immediately.
39.	Bellefonte, Pennsylvania	July 16, 2018	July 16, 2018	Ordinance	On July 16, 2018, an ordinance to ban conversion therapy was approved by the Borough Council. The ordinance went into effect immediately.
40.	Bethlehem, Pennsylvania	July 17, 2018	July 17, 2018	Ordinance	On July 3, 2018, an ordinance to ban conversion therapy was approved unanimously by the City Council, and on July 17, 2018, was approved in a second and final reading. The ordinance was dubbed the Appropriate Mental Health Services Ordinance. It went into effect immediately.
41.	Madison, Wisconsin	July 10, 2018	July 20, 2018	Ordinance	On July 10, 2018, an ordinance to ban conversion therapy was approved by the city's Common Council. The ordinance went into effect on July 20, 2018.
42.	Ulster County, New York	July 20, 2018	July 27, 2018	Ordinance	On June 20, 2018, an ordinance to ban conversion therapy on minors was unanimously approved by the Ulster County Legislature. It was signed by County Executive Michael P. Hein on July 20, 2018, and took effect upon filing with the New York Secretary of State on July 27, 2018.
43.	Rochester, New York	July 25, 2018	August 25, 2018	Ordinance	In July 2018, consumer protection legislation was introduced to the City Council to prohibit conversion therapy. On July 24, 2018, an ordinance to ban conversion therapy on minors was unanimously approved by the City Council. It was deemed duly adopted on July 25 and took effect 30 days later.
44.	Albany County, New York	July 9, 2018	August 31, 2018	Ordinance	On July 9, 2018, the Albany County Legislature approved an ordinance to ban conversion therapy by a vote of 37–1. The ordinance was signed and adopted by the County Executive on August 2, 2018, and was filed with the New York Secretary of State on August 31, 2018.
45.	Eau Claire, Wisconsin	October 9, 2018	October 9, 2018	Ordinance	On October 9, 2018, the Eau Claire City Council unanimously passed an ordinance to protect minors from conversion therapy.
46.	Lakewood, Ohio	October 15, 2018	October 15, 2018	Ordinance	On October 15, 2018, the Lakewood City Council unanimously approved a measure to ban conversion therapy. Fines for violating the law range from $500 to $1,000.
47.	Westchester County, New York	October 18, 2018	October 26, 2018	Ordinance	On October 1, 2018, the Westchester County Board of Legislators unanimously voted to ban the practice of conversion therapy. County Executive George Latimer signed the ordinance into law on October 18, and on October 26, 2018, it was filed with the New York Department of State. Those practicing conversion therapy may face a misdemeanor punishable by a $1,000 fine or up to one year imprisonment.
48.	Newtown Township, Pennsylvania	November 28, 2018	November 28, 2018	Ordinance	On November 28, 2018, the Newtown Township (Bucks County) Board of Supervisors voted 4–0 to prohibit conversion therapy in a bill establishing a Human Rights Commission, enacting immediately upon passage.
49.	Cudahy, Wisconsin	January 2, 2019	January 2, 2019	Ordinance	On January 2, 2019, the Cudahy Common Council voted to prohibit conversion therapy by a vote of 4–1.
50.	Denver, Colorado	January 8, 2019	January 8, 2019	Ordinance	On January 7, 2019, the Denver City Council unanimously voted to ban the practice of conversion therapy, and the ordinance was signed into law by Mayor Michael Hancock the following day. Violations of the ordinance may be subject to penalties of $150 to $999 per violation. The ban was seen as "largely symbolic", as the city had no known practitioners of conversion therapy.
51.	Erie, Pennsylvania	June 5, 2019	June 5, 2019	Ordinance	On June 5, 2019, the Erie City Council approved a conversion therapy ban.
52.	Shorewood, Wisconsin	June 17, 2019	June 17, 2019	Ordinance	An ordinance banning the practice of conversion therapy was approved by the Shorewood Village Board on June 17, 2019, and went into effect immediately upon passage. The ban does not apply to free services.
53.	Huntington Woods, Michigan	June 4, 2019	June 24, 2019	Ordinance	In a unanimous vote, the Huntington Woods City Commission approved a ban on conversion therapy. The ordinance went into force 20 days later.
54.	Alachua County, Florida	May 28, 2019	July 9, 2019	Ordinance	In a unanimous vote on May 28, 2019, the Alachua County Commission voted to prohibit the practice of conversion therapy on minors within the county. The bill took effect 10 days after filing with the Florida Secretary of State. Violators of the ordinance may be fined $500 per violation.
55.	Kent, Ohio	July 17, 2019	July 17, 2019	Ordinance	An ordinance to ban conversion therapy on minors was unanimously passed by the Kent City Council on July 17, 2019, and became effective that same day.
56.	Racine, Wisconsin	July 16, 2019	July 18, 2019	Ordinance	On July 8, 2019, the Racine Common Council's Finance and Personnel Committee unanimously approved a conversion therapy ordinance banning the practice. On July 16, the council passed the ordinance 11–3, and Mayor Cory Mason signed it into law on July 18. It allows for fines up to $1000 for each day the ordinance is violated.
57.	Sheboygan, Wisconsin	August 5, 2019	August 5, 2019	Ordinance	On August 5, 2019, the Sheboygan Common Council passed (8–1) a conversion therapy ordinance banning the practice in the city of Sheboygan.
58.	Superior, Wisconsin	August 20, 2019	August 20, 2019	Ordinance	An ordinance banning conversion therapy on minors was passed by the Superior City Council on August 20, 2019, and took effect immedidately upon passage.
59.	Glendale, Wisconsin	August 26, 2019	August 26, 2019	Ordinance	An ordinance banning conversion therapy was approved by the Glendale Common Council on August 26, 2019.
60.	Fort Lauderdale, Florida	September 17, 2019	September 17, 2019	Ordinance	On September 12, 2019, the Fort Lauderdale City Commission passed, in its first reading, an ordinance, which among other things, bans the use of conversion therapy on minors. The ban unanimously passed its second and final reading on September 17 and took effect immediately.
61.	East Lansing, Michigan	September 10, 2019	September 18, 2019	Ordinance	In a divided 3–2 vote, the East Lansing City Council approved a conversion therapy ban, which took effect 8 days later.
62.	Columbia, Missouri	October 7, 2019	October 7, 2019	Ordinance	The Columbia City Council unanimously approved a conversion therapy ordinance on October 7, 2019.
63.	Ferndale, Michigan	October 14, 2019	October 14, 2019	Ordinance	The Ferndale City Council unanimously passed a conversion therapy ban on October 14, 2019, making the practice a misdemeanor and punishable by up to 93 days in jail and a fine of $500.
64.	Kansas City, Missouri	November 14, 2019	November 14, 2019	Ordinance	A conversion therapy ordinance was introduced on October 24, 2019, and was passed unanimously in its final reading on November 14.
65.	Minneapolis, Minnesota	November 22, 2019	November 30, 2019	Ordinance	An ordinance banning the use of conversion therapy on minors was unanimously passed by the Minneapolis City Council on November 22, 2019. It was signed by Mayor Jacob Frey on November 26 and was published four days later.
66.	St. Louis, Missouri	December 23, 2019	December 23, 2019	Ordinance	On December 23, 2019, Mayor Lyda Krewson signed an ordinance prohibiting the use of conversion therapy on minors. The ordinance had previously been approved by the Board of Aldermen.
67.	Berkley, Michigan	December 2, 2019	January 1, 2020	Ordinance	The Berkley City Council held a first reading on an ordinance to prohibit conversion therapy in early November. The ordinance passed its final reading on December 2, 2019, and went into effect 30 days later.
68.	Duluth, Minnesota	December 16, 2019	January 15, 2020	Ordinance	An ordinance banning conversion therapy for minors was approved unanimously by the Duluth City Council on December 16, 2019. It went into effect 30 days later on January 15, 2020.
69.	Appleton, Wisconsin	January 22, 2020	January 22, 2020	Ordinance	The Appleton Common Council passed a conversion therapy ban on January 22, 2020, by a 14–1 vote.
70.	Allegheny County, Pennsylvania	February 11, 2020	February 14, 2020	Ordinance	A ban on conversion therapy was approved 13–2 on February 11, 2020. Final approval was granted three days later.
71.	Covington, Kentucky	March 24, 2020	March 24, 2020	Ordinance	The Covington City Council passed a conversion therapy ban on March 24, 2020, by a unanimous vote of 5–0.
72.	Tallahassee, Florida	April 8, 2020	April 8, 2020	Ordinance	An ordinance banning conversion therapy for minors was approved unanimously by the Tallahassee City Council on April 8, 2020, and it went into effect immediately.
73.	Davenport, Iowa	April 22, 2020	April 28, 2020	Ordinance	An ordinance banning conversion therapy for minors was approved 8–2 on April 22, 2020, and went into effect upon publication on April 28. Mayor Mike Matson stated the bill was inspired in part by Davenport's score on the Human Rights Campaign's municpital equality index.
74.	Roeland Park, Kansas	June 1, 2020	June 1, 2020	Ordinance	An ordinance to ban conversion therapy was introduced to the City Council in May 2020. It passed the Council on June 1, by a 7–0 vote, and went into effect that same day after Mayor Mike Kelly had given his signature.
75.	Red Wing, Minnesota	June 22, 2020	July 6, 2020	Ordinance	On June 22, 2020, the Red Wing City Council passed an ordinance to ban conversion therapy, taking effect two weeks later. It went into effect on July 6, 2020.
76.	Saint Paul, Minnesota	June 17, 2020	July 17, 2020	Ordinance	The St. Paul City Council unanimously passed a conversion therapy ban on June 17, 2020, with penalties of up to $1,000. The ordinance went into effect one month later.
77.	Madison Heights, Michigan	July 27, 2020		Ordinance	On July 27, 2020, the Madison Heights City Council voted unanimously make conversion therapy by healthcare providers a criminal offense subject to imprisonment and fines.
78.	Royal Oak, Michigan	August 10, 2020	August 10, 2020	Ordinance	On August 10, 2020, the Royal Oak City Commission passed an ordinance which makes it a criminal misdemeanor – punishable by up to 90 days in jail and a $500 fine – for a mental health professional to engage in conversion therapy with a minor. The ordinance was drafted after a unanimous resolution on June 22, 2020.
79.	West St. Paul, Minnesota	August 17, 2020	August 17, 2020	Ordinance	A conversion therapy ban was passed 5–1 on August 17, 2020, and went into force upon passage.
80.	Winona, Minnesota	August 17, 2020	September 2020	Ordinance	The Winona City Council unanimously (6–0) passed a conversion therapy ban on August 17, 2020. One council member was absent during the vote. The ordinance makes the practice subject an administrative offense subject to a fine, and it went into effect in September 2020.
81.	Anchorage, Alaska	August 26, 2020	August 26, 2020	Ordinance	The Anchorage Assembly passed a conversion therapy ban on August 26, 2020, by a 9–2 vote.
82.	West Allis, Wisconsin	September 1, 2020	September 1, 2020	Ordinance	The West Allis Common Council passed a conversion therapy ban on September 1, 2020, by a 6–3 vote. The ordinance makes conversion therapy on minors illegal and punishable by a $5,000 fine.
83.	Middletown Township, Bucks County, Pennsylvania	September 8, 2020	September 8, 2020	Ordinance	On September 8, 2020, the Township of Middletown's Board of Supervisors voted unanimously to establish a Human Relations Commission. Under this ordinance, conversion therapy performed on a minor by a mental health professional is unlawful discrimination.
84.	Louisville, Kentucky	September 17, 2020	October 1, 2020	Ordinance	On September 2, 2020, Louisville Councilman Bill Hollander filed an ordinance to ban conversion therapy by licensed professionals and to prevent public funds from being used for the practice. On September 9, the Louisville Metro Council's Community Affairs, Health and Education Committee unanimously voted to recommend the ordinance, and on September 17, the Council passed it by a 24–1 vote. The ordinance went into effect two weeks later after Mayor Greg Fischer signed it into law on October 1.
85.	Kenosha, Wisconsin	October 5, 2020	October 5, 2020	Ordinance	The Kenosha City Council passed an ordinance outlawing conversion therapy on October 5, 2020, by a 14–1 vote. The ordinance makes conversion therapy for compensation – or knowingly assisting or facilitating such a practice – punishable by a fine and 90 days in jail.
86.	Robbinsdale, Minnesota	February 2, 2021	February 2, 2021	Ordinance	On January 5, 2021, the Robbinsdale City Council voted unanimously to pass a first reading of a conversion therapy ban. They passed a second reading of the conversion therapy ban, also unanimously, on February 2, 2021. The ban makes conversion therapy performed by a medical practice a level five violation punishable by a fine.
87.	Lincoln, Nebraska	February 22, 2021	February 22, 2021	Ordinance	The Lincoln City Council passed a conversion therapy ban, introduced by Councilman James Michael Bowers, by a 5–1 vote with one member absent on February 22, 2021. The measure was praised by Mayor Leirion Gaylor Baird. The ban applies only to licensed mental health professionals.
88.	Scranton, Pennsylvania	April 6, 2021	April 6, 2021	Ordinance	On April 6, 2021, the Scranton City Council voted 4–0 (with President Bill Gaughan absent), proactively barring licensed mental health professionals from practicing conversion therapy on minors. The measure was proposed that March by Councilwoman Jessica Rothchild, the council's first openly gay member.
89.	Bloomington, Minnesota	April 19, 2021		Ordinance	On April 19, 2021, the Bloomington City Council voted 6–1 to ban conversion therapy for minors and vulnerable adults. In contrast to other – largely proactive – bans in Minnesota, at the time of the ban, Bloomington had two licensed providers who practiced conversion therapy on minors.
90.	Lawrence, Kansas	April 20, 2021	May 4, 2021	Ordinance	On April 20, 2021, the Lawrence City Commission voted unanimously to ban the practice of conversion therapy by licensed providers. While an explicit exception for religious organizations was removed from the ordinance, the ban implicitly does not apply to unlicensed clergy or pastoral counselors. The measure was inspired by a similar ban in Roeland Park.
91.	Lexington, Kentucky	May 6, 2021	May 6, 2021	Ordinance	The Lexington-Fayette Urban County Council passed a conversion therapy ban unanimously on May 6, 2021.
92.	Sun Prairie, Wisconsin	May 18, 2021	May 21, 2021	Ordinance	The Sun Prairie City Council unanimously passed a conversion therapy ban on May 18, 2021.
94.	Norman, Oklahoma	June 29, 2021		Ordinance	On May 11, 2021, the Norman, Oklahoma City Council considered a ban on the use of city funds for conversion therapy on minors, but some council members felt the ordinance did not go far enough, and no action was taken. On May 24, the Norman Human Rights Commission unanimously recommended the council ban conversion therapy on minors by medical professionals, and on June 22, an ordinance amended from the original to include this provision – making the practice a misdemeanor punishable by up to $750 or up to 60 days in jail – passed a first reading. In a unanimous vote on June 29, the council passed the ordinance.
95.	North Kansas City, Missouri	July 20, 2021	July 20, 2021	Ordinance	The North Kansas City Council unanimously passed a conversion therapy ban on July 20, 2021.
96.	Charleston, West Virginia	August 2, 2021		Ordinance	On August 2, 2021, the Charleston City Council passed a bill prohibiting mental health providers from using conversion therapy on minors by a vote of 14–9. Violations are punishable by license revocation and a fine of $1,000. This made Charleston the first city in West Virginia to ban conversion therapy.
97.	Ann Arbor, Michigan	August 16, 2021	August 16, 2021	Ordinance	On August 16, 2021, the Ann Arbor City Council unanimously passed an ordinance prohibiting mental health providers and professional counselors from using conversion therapy on minors. Violations are punishable by no more than $500 per day.
98.	Prairie Village, Kansas	October 18, 2021	October 26, 2021	Ordinance	On September 21, 2021, the Prairie Village city council voted 10–2 to draft an ordinance to ban conversion therapy for minors. On October 5, the council voted 11–1 to progress the draft to a final vote, and on October 18, they voted 11–1 to pass the ordinance, with violations resulting in a fine up to $1000 for licensed practitioners. The ban goes into effect on October 26.
99.	Morgantown, West Virginia	October 19, 2021	October 19, 2021	Ordinance	On October 5, 2021, the Morgantown city council voted 7–0 to move an ordinance banning conversion therapy on minors to a final approval following a first reading. Final approval was given in a 7–0 vote on October 19, 2021.
100.	Independence, Missouri	November 16, 2021		Ordinance	On November 16, 2021, the Independence City Council voted 6–0 to ban conversion therapy on minors following two failed efforts.
101.	Wheeling, West Virginia	May 4, 2022	May 4, 2022	Ordinance	On May 4, 2022, Wheeling City Council voted 4–3 to ban conversion therapy on minors.
102.	La Crosse, Wisconsin	June 9, 2022	June 9, 2022	Ordinance	On June 9, 2022, La Crosse City Council voted 6–4 to ban conversion therapy on minors.
103.	Linn County, Iowa	June 13, 2022	June 13, 2022	Ordinance	On June 13, 2022, the Linn County Board of Supervisors voted 2–1 to ban conversion therapy on minors. The ban applies only to unincorporated areas of the county.
104.	Cleveland Heights, Ohio	June 21, 2022	June 21, 2022	Ordinance	On June 21, 2022, the Cleveland Heights City Council voted to ban conversion therapy on minors.
105.	Reynoldsburg, Ohio	June 27, 2022		Ordinance	On June 27, 2022, the Reynoldsburg City Council voted 6–1 to ban conversion therapy on minors.
106.	Huntington, West Virginia	July 11, 2022		Ordinance	On July 11, 2022, the Huntington City Council voted 7–4 to ban conversion therapy on minors.
107.	Northfield, Minnesota	July 12, 2022		Ordinance	On July 12, 2022, the Northfield City Council voted 6–1 to ban conversion therapy on minors.
108.	Cleveland, Ohio	October 10, 2022		Ordinance	On October 10, 2022, the Cleveland City Council voted unanimously to ban conversion therapy on minors.
109.	Richfield, Minnesota	October 11, 2022		Ordinance	On October 11, 2022, the Richfield City Council voted unanimously to ban conversion therapy on minors and vulnerable adults.
110.	Akron, Ohio	October 24, 2022	October 24, 2022	Ordinance	On October 24, 2022, the Akron City Council voted unanimously to ban conversion therapy on minors.
111.	Jackson County, Missouri	April 19, 2023		Ordinance	On April 3, 2023, the Jackson County Legislature voted to ban conversion therapy. A ban had previously failed that March. The ban was signed on April 19, 2023, by Jackson County Executive Frank White Jr.
112.	Lorain, Ohio	September 3, 2024		Ordinance	On September 3, 2024, Lorain City Council voted unanimously to ban conversion therapy.
113.	Westerville, Ohio	February 18, 2025		Ordinance	On February 18, 2025, Westerville Council voted to ban conversion therapy.
114.	Whitehall, Ohio	August 19, 2025		Ordinance	On August 19, 2025, Whitehall Council voted to ban conversion therapy as well anti-LGBT discrimination.
115.	Cuyahoga County, Ohio	September 10, 2025		Ordinance	On September 10, 2025, Cuyahoga County Council members voted, unanimous, in favor to ban conversion therapy for minors and “vulnerable adults,” in Cuyahoga County. The ordinance was sponsored by Robert Schleper Jr. County Council's first out gay member.

== School boards ==
School boards with prohibitions on conversion therapy on the basis of sexual orientation and gender identity or expression
	School board	Date of enactment	Date effective	Legalization method	Details
1.	Eau Claire Area School District Board of Education, Wisconsin	September 24, 2018	September 24, 2018	Policy	On September 24, 2018, the Eau Claire School Board voted unanimously (7 ayes) in favor of Board Policy 453.7 - Student Mental Health and Wellness Education, which included a clause stating "the Eau Claire Area School District shall exclusively enter into School-based health center agreements with health clinics and/or providers that agree to abide by the District's Nondiscrimination Policy for Students. The District shall not enter into agreements with health clinics and/or providers that endorse or engage in the practice of conversion therapy." The policy went into effect immediately.

== Medical, psychological and psychiatric organizations ==
Despite the lack of federal legislation regarding bans on conversion therapy, such therapy has been banned by numerous therapy organizations operating in the U.S. It has been banned by the American Psychiatric Association since 1998. In 2009, conversion therapy was also rebuked by the American Psychological Association. Others include the American Academy of Child and Adolescent Psychiatry, the American Academy of Pediatrics, the American Medical Association, the American College of Physicians, the American Academy of Physician Assistants, and many more.

== Resolutions and proclamations ==
As of February 2021, fourteen cities/counties have passed non-binding resolutions or proclamations declaring opposition to conversion therapy. These are Edgewater, Colorado; Westminster, Colorado; Wheat Ridge, Colorado; Indianapolis, Indiana; Atlanta, Georgia; Worcester, Massachusetts; Columbia, Missouri; Suffolk County, New York; Harrisburg, Pennsylvania; Appleton, Wisconsin; Eau Claire County, Wisconsin; Richmond, Virginia; Rochester, Minnesota; and Shorewood, Wisconsin.

== Legal challenges and prohibitions on bans ==
The New Jersey ban on conversion therapy was upheld by district judge Freda L. Wolfson; the case was brought upon by parents who alleged that it violated their rights under the First Amendment, Fourteenth Amendment, and to freedom of religion. Wolfson upheld the ban, ruling that the law regulated conduct and not speech.

In August 2013, California's ban was upheld by the Ninth Circuit Court of Appeals in Pickup v. Brown and Welch v. Brown. The Supreme Court declined to hear an appeal against the ruling. In February 2015, the New Jersey Superior Court issued a pre-trial ruling in Ferguson v. JONAH, finding that offering conversion services on the basis of a description of homosexuality as "abnormal" or a mental illness violated the state's consumer fraud act. In June 2015, the Court ordered JONAH to pay damages and cease all operations, and prohibited its founder Arthur A. Goldberg from further practicing any form of conversion therapy in the state of New Jersey.

In 2020, the Eleventh Circuit ruled that a ban on conversion therapy enforced by Palm Beach County and Boca Raton, Florida violated the First Amendment rights of therapists, as upholding the statute could also allow ordinances that prohibit gender-affirming mental health assistance, and "people have intense moral, religious, and spiritual views about these matters—on all sides. And that is exactly why the First Amendment does not allow communities to determine how their neighbors may be counseled about matters of sexual orientation or gender.

In March 2023, the state of Indiana passed a bill prohibiting local governments from regulating services that are licensed or specifically exempt from licensure from the state, including behavioral therapy (and, in turn, conversion therapy). This bill was originally intended to effectively target conversion therapy (being tabled in retaliation for an attempt to institute a conversion therapy ban for unlicensed practitioners in West Lafayette, Indiana), but was extended in the legislative process to also include other categories of state-licensed services beyond behavioral health.

In March 2026, the Supreme Court ruled in Chiles v. Salazar that portions of Colorado's conversion therapy ban in regards to talk therapy must be reviewed with strict scrutiny by lower courts, overturning a ruling against a Colorado therapist who was requesting an as-applied challenge over the ban. The majority opinion found that this portion of the ban constituted the regulation of speech based on viewpoints, and that "the First Amendment stands as a shield against any effort to enforce orthodoxy in thought or speech in this country". Colorado subsequently passed an amendment to its conversion therapy ban as to not regulate a viewpoint, redefining conversion therapy as the direction of a patient to a "predetermined sexual orientation or gender identity outcome", or to "eliminate or reduce attractions toward individuals of a particular sex or gender". Therefore, the practices affected by this ban would only include those proven to be unsuccessful and harmful by medical research, allowing room for practices which offer support for those going through gender changing or sexual orientation transitions.

== Former bans ==
On September 18, 2024, Kentucky Governor Andy Beshear (D) signed an executive order prohibiting the use of state funds for conversion therapy on minors, and barring medical professionals from practicing conversion therapy on minors, but this ban was overturned by the state legislature, which overrode Beshear's veto to pass a bill that rescinds his executive order on March 27, 2025.

On May 16, 2023, the Waterloo, Iowa City Council voted 6–1 to ban conversion therapy on minors by medical professionals. On August 21, 2023, this ordinance was removed.

In June 2025, Attorney General of Virginia Jason Miyares entered into a consent decree to not enforce the ban on talk conversion therapy.

On June 15, 2021, the Columbia City Council passed an ordinance in a 4–3 vote which makes conversion therapy a civil violation for licensed counselors or therapists, punishable by a $500 fine. The measure was repealed in a 4–3 vote on June 24, 2025, under threat of loss of funding from the state.

On April 25, 2017, the Therapeutic Fraud Prevention Act (TFPA) sponsored by Representative Ted Lieu and Senators Cory Booker and Patty Murray proposed the first-ever attempted federal ban on conversion therapy. The proposal classified conversion therapy as a form of fraudulent practice and commercial fraud rather than a medical procedure. The difference in classification enforces conversion therapy under the Federal Trade Commission's authority effectively linking the actions of providing or advertising these services to consumer fraud.

== See also ==
- LGBTQ rights in the United States
- LGBTQ rights by country or territory
