= JONAH =

American Jewish ex-gay organization

JONAH Inc.
- JONAH International logo
- Successor: Jewish Institute for Global Awareness
- Founded: 1998; 28 years ago
- Founders: Elaine Burke; Theodore Burke; Arthur Goldberg; Jane Goldberg
- Dissolved: 2016; 10 years ago
- Tax ID no.: 22-3674448
- Legal status: 501(c)(3) nonprofit corporation (prior to dissolution)
- Headquarters: Jersey City, New Jersey, United States
- Revenue: $20,984 (2016)
- Expenses: $22,350 (2016)

Jews Offering New Alternatives for Healing (JONAH), previously Jews Offering New Alternatives to Homosexuality, was an American Jewish nonprofit organization that offered conversion therapy to persons who sought sexual orientation change. JONAH stated that it was "dedicated to educating the world-wide Jewish community about the social, cultural and emotional factors which lead to same-sex attractions". JONAH's leaders disagreed with the consensus of mainstream science and the world's major mental health organizations who say that non-heterosexual sexual orientation is not a disorder.

In 2015, a landmark trial found that JONAH's claims to be able to change sexual orientation constituted consumer fraud. The organization was ordered to pay restitution to the plaintiffs and shut down within thirty days. Eleven days after the verdict, the founders created a conversion therapy organization called Jewish Institute for Global Awareness (JIFGA) using JONAH's assets. In June 2019, a New Jersey judge ordered JIFGA to shut down within thirty days and pay $3.5 million to victims.

== History ==
JONAH was created in 1998 in Jersey City, New Jersey, by two married couples, Theodore and Elaine Berk and Arthur and Jane Goldberg. Arthur Goldberg is a former secretary-treasurer of the National Association for Research & Therapy of Homosexuality. The organization was formed after the founders' sons experienced unwanted homosexual attractions and were unable to obtain professional assistance in resolving or overcoming those attractions. The organization did not use the phrase "conversion therapy" to describe its activities. In 2000, JONAH provided literature and outreach to gay and bisexual Jews, and their families of all denominations, in New York, New Jersey, and Connecticut, advertising their supposed methods of reducing and eliminating homosexuality. JONAH became a 501(c)(3) nonprofit corporation in 2000 and expanded to include members in the United States, Israel, Canada, and various European nations.

During JONAH's 2014 consumer fraud trial, it was revealed that Goldberg's license as a board certified professional counselor was revoked in 2011 because the American Psychotherapy Association learned that Goldberg had lied on his application by failing to disclose his prior felony conviction as a Wall Street municipal bonds manager.

== Methodology ==
JONAH held a core belief that homosexuality is a spiritual problem rooted in childhood trauma. JONAH emphasized the Talmudic understanding of homosexuality as "being led astray" (Nedarim 51a); therefore, consistent with its view of the Jewish principle of repentance (teshuvah), the organization viewed homosexual persons as being able "to return" from homosexuality. According to JONAH, same-sex attractions may be mitigated and potentially eliminated. JONAH employed the techniques of Richard Cohen, an unlicensed counselor who promotes conversion therapy. Techniques for overcoming homosexual urges included undressing in front of other men, pummeling an effigy of one's mother, and re-enacting traumatic childhood experiences.

On 29 November 2012, the Orthodox Rabbinical Council of America issued a statement indicating that it did not endorse JONAH'S methods. The Council added that it made this decision "based on consultation with a wide range of mental health experts and therapists who informed us of the lack of scientifically rigorous studies that support the effectiveness of therapies to change sexual orientation, a review of literature written by experts and major medical and mental health organizations, and based upon reports of the negative and, at times, deleterious consequences to clients of some of the interventions endorsed by JONAH".

== Ferguson v. JONAH ==
In July 2010, a video published by the organization Truth Wins Out features two former participants of JONAH, Ben Unger and Chaim Levin, alleging that Alan Downing, a life coach connected with JONAH, demanded that his participants strip off all of their clothing in front of a mirror and touch their genitals in his presence. Downing released a statement in response denying the charges. After emails were sent to the Association of Orthodox Jewish Scientists linking to the video, the organization initially rescinded a previous invitation to JONAH's founder Arthur Goldberg to speak at their annual convention, but later allowed him to speak. Yael Respler of The Jewish Press printed a letter by Goldberg about the incident and noted in response that she herself had engaged in reparative therapy (also called conversion therapy).

In November 2012, the Southern Poverty Law Center filed the lawsuit Ferguson v. JONAH against JONAH, Goldberg, and Downing on behalf of Michael Ferguson, Ben Unger, Chaim Levin, and two of the participants' mothers for fraudulent practices which are illegal under New Jersey's consumer protection laws. JONAH challenged the veracity of the plaintiffs' allegations. In 2014, Superior Court Judge Peter Bariso ruled that JONAH and its co-defendants could have to pay three times the cost paid by the participants for therapy they said they needed because of JONAH's conversion therapy.

In February 2015, Judge Bariso ruled that JONAH's claims of gay conversion therapy that describe homosexuality as a curable mental disorder were illegal based on the state's Consumer Fraud Act. Judge Bariso also said it is fraudulent to offer "success statistics" because "there is no factual basis for calculating such statistics". The judge also excluded expert testimony from leading conversion therapy proponents, Joseph Nicolosi and Christopher Doyle, ruling that their opinions were based on the false premise that homosexuality is a disorder. Bariso wrote that "the theory that homosexuality is a disorder is not novel but – like the notion that the earth is flat and the sun revolves around it – instead is outdated and refuted".

In response to Judge Bariso's ruling, David Dinielli, deputy legal director for the Southern Poverty Law Center, said, "This is the principal lie the conversion therapy industry uses throughout the country to peddle its quackery to vulnerable clients. Gay people don't need to be cured, and we are thrilled that the court has recognized this".

=== Trial ===
On 25 June 2015, in the first-ever trial of conversion therapy in the United States, a New Jersey jury found JONAH guilty of consumer fraud for promising to be able to change its clients' sexual urges and determined its commercial practices to be unconscionable. The jury voted unanimously to convict JONAH under the Consumer Fraud Act of New Jersey. The verdict required JONAH and Downing to refund thousands of dollars paid by former clients.

=== Permanent injunction ===
In December 2015, the parties entered into a settlement agreement that required JONAH to shut down entirely and prohibited founder Arthur Goldberg and counselor Alan Downing from engaging in any form of conversion therapy in New Jersey. Under the settlement, the defendants were obliged to pay the full US$72,400 in damages awarded by the jury to compensate the plaintiffs for the fees they paid to JONAH and for remedial mental health counseling for one plaintiff. The proposed judgment included a $3.5 million award of legal fees. The plaintiffs agreed to accept an undisclosed portion of that award, but the defendants would remain liable for the full amount if they violated the agreement. According to federal tax records, JONAH formally dissolved in 2016.

=== Aftermath ===
Eleven days after the verdict, JONAH was reincorporated as JIFGA, "Jewish Institute for Global Awareness", keeping JONAH's assets, leadership and operations, as well as the same address and phone number. The Southern Poverty Law Center says that this is an attempt to evade the shutdown order and has appealed to the courts to enforce the previous ruling against JIFGA. In June 2019, Judge Bariso found that JIFGA was an illegitimate attempt to continue JONAH in violation of the court order. He ordered JIFGA to shut down within thirty days and pay a $3.5 million fine to victims of the scam. The judge forbade Arthur Goldberg and Elaine Berk from serving in executive leadership or on the board of any nonprofit organization. According to federal tax records, JIFGA technically continued to operate until 2020.

== See also ==
- Atzat Nefesh
- Ex-Ex-Gay
- Ex-gay movement
