= Gerald Schoenewolf =

American psychoanalyst (born 1941)

Gerald Frederick Schoenewolf (born September 23, 1941) is an American psychoanalyst best known for his staunch promotion of neoclassical psychoanalytic theory. He is the author of 13 books on psychoanalysis and psychotherapy.

== Biography ==
Schoenewolf was born to Harold Frederick Schoenewolf and Minna Henrietta Joseph in Fredericksburg, Texas on September 23, 1941. He was the third of four sons. After graduating from high school in Kerrville, Texas in 1960, he attended North Texas State University for a year and then moved to New York City. He worked at various jobs from typing to graphic art to copywriting while he pursued acting and playwriting careers. He completed his BA degree at Goddard College in Vermont (1975), an MA in philosophy from California State University, Dominguez Hills (1978) and a Ph.D. from The Union Institute & University in Cincinnati (1981). He received a Certificate in Psychoanalysis from the Washington Square Institute in New York (1981) and began practice as a psychotherapist in 1979. He has been an Adjunct Assistant Professor at the Borough of Manhattan Community College since 2002.

== Career ==
His first book, 101 Common Therapeutic Blunders: Countertransference and Counterresistance in Psychotherapy (1987), was written with his mentor Richard C. Robertiello, MD, and was an instant psychotherapy bestseller. Subsequently he became known as a neoclassical psychoanalyst and defender of Freudian theories and was largely shunned by the psychoanalytic community when Sigmund Freud’s theories came under attack by feminists and others. During his time serving as an advisor for the National Association for Research & Therapy of Homosexuality (NARTH) he came under criticism from the Southern Poverty Law Center (SPLC) for authoring an article for NARTH in which he suggested that African slaves sold to the United States by African slave traders may have been better off in America. In two of his books, The Art of Hating (1991) and Psychoanalytic Centrism: Collected Papers of a Neoclassical Psychoanalyst (2012), he developed his theory of gender narcissism, in which he speculated that many males and females suffer from a kind of narcissism rooted in unconscious feelings of inferiority about their gender that causes them to sometimes become overly proud and obsessive about it. In the latter work, he also introduced the theory of the Death Trauma, which occurs in childhood when an individual first becomes aware of mortality. This awareness can then affect personality formation.

== Bibliography ==
- 101 Common Therapeutic Blunders: Countertransference and Counterresistance in Psychotherapy (with Richard C. Robertielo, 1987)
- 101 Therapeutic Successes: Overcoming Transference and Resistance in Psychotherapy (1989)
- Sexual Animosity between Men and Women (1989)
- Turning Points in Analytic Therapy, The Classic Cases (1990)
- Turning Points in Analytic Therapy, from Winnicott to Kernberg (1991)
- The Art of Hating (Jason Aronson, 1991)
- Jennifer and Her Selves (1992)
- Countertransference: The Therapist's Interference with the Therapeutic Process (1993)
- The Couple’s Guide to Erotic Games (1994)
- The Couple Who Fell in Hate and Other Tales of Eclectic Psychotherapy (1996)
- The Dictionary of Dream Interpretation (1997)
- The Way According to Lao Tzu, Chuang Tzu and Seng Tsan (1999)
- Psychotherapy with People in the Arts (2001)
- 111 Common Therapeutic Blunders, Revised Edition (2005)
- A Way You'll Never Be (novel, 2009)
- Flugelhorn's Flight, or Kidnapped by Babes from Outer Space (novel, 2009)
- Holding On and Letting Go: Poems and Drawings (2009)
- An Ordinary Lunacy (novel, 2010)
- Scenes from a Man's Life (novel, 2010)
- Psychoanalytic Centrism: Collected Papers of a Neoclassical Psychoanalyst (2012)
- 76 Typical Therapy Mistakes: A Workbook for Psychotherapists (2013)
