= Joseph Nicolosi =

American clinical psychologist (1947–2017)

- Born: January 24, 1947; New York, U.S.
- Died: March 8, 2017 (aged 70); California, U.S.
- Education: The New School (MA); California School of Professional Psychology (PhD)
- Occupation: Psychologist
- Spouse: Linda Nicolosi (m. 1978)

Joseph Nicolosi (January 24, 1947 – March 8, 2017) was an American clinical psychologist who advocated and practised "reparative therapy", a form of the pseudoscientific treatment of conversion therapy that he claimed could help people overcome or mitigate their homosexual desires and replace them with heterosexual ones. Nicolosi was a founder and president of the National Association for Research and Therapy of Homosexuality (NARTH).

== Biography ==
Nicolosi earned a Master of Arts from the New School for Social Research and a Ph.D. from the California School of Professional Psychology. He was a founding member of the National Association for Research & Therapy of Homosexuality (NARTH) and was its president for some time. NARTH is a professional association that promotes the acceptance of conversion therapy. He was an advisor to, and officer of, NARTH. NARTH was for some time based in Encino at Nicolosi's own "Thomas Aquinas Psychological Clinic". According to the Southern Poverty Law Center, "NARTH presents its methods as based on scientific fact rather than religious belief". Nicolosi was a Roman Catholic.

Nicolosi described his ideas in Reparative Therapy of Male Homosexuality: A New Clinical Approach (1991) and three other books. Nicolosi proposed that homosexuality is often the product of a condition he described as gender-identity deficit caused by an alienation from, and perceived rejection by, formative individuals of the subject's gender which interrupts normal masculine or feminine identification process. Scientific research, summarized in a 2016 academic review, has not supported Nicolosi's hypothesis that parents play a role in the development of sexual orientation, and social theories are particularly weak for males. Research has supported the role of the non-social environment, including prenatal hormones and maternal immune responses.

In 2009, Royal College of Psychiatrists criticized Nicolosi's appearance at a conference in London, saying that: "there is no sound scientific evidence that sexual orientation can be changed" and "furthermore, so-called treatments of homosexuality create a setting in which prejudice and discrimination can flourish." Nicolosi gave an interview with the BBC in order to defend his opinions, claiming: "we have a great deal of evidence". The conference, at which Nicolosi was a keynote speaker, was organized by Anglican Mainstream, a conservative religious charity, and by evangelical conservative lobby group Christian Action Research and Education, and its organizers professed to be "very worried about the continued progress of the gay ... agenda". At the conference, Nicolosi performed "therapy" on a man live in front of the audience, a sight Patrick Strudwick described as "like I was watching a blood sport".

In 2012, California passed a law that banned the provision of conversion therapy to minors, including some of Nicolosi's existing patients. Nicolosi was named as a plaintiff in a lawsuit challenging the law on constitutional grounds but the law, effectively barring Nicolosi's clinic from taking on patients under the age of 18, was subsequently upheld. The Supreme Court later explicitly referenced this case.

In 2013, Nicolosi appeared in Stephen Fry's television documentary Stephen Fry: Out There, which examined different attitudes to homosexuality. Nicolosi informed Fry that "sixty percent of our clients now are teenagers. Parents call up in a panic because they found out their son is looking at gay porn, and, of course we have to get him into therapy". After the segment, Fry says that "for all his talk of success, Nicolosi is unable to find one of his ex-gays to talk to us". Fry then speaks with Daniel Gonzales, a former client of Nicolosi's who did not have success in changing his sexual orientation. Gonzales condemns the therapy.

From 2013, protests were raised in Spain over the sale of three of Nicolosi's books titled: I Want to Stop Being Gay (Spanish: Quiero Dejar De Ser Homosexual), How to Prevent Homosexuality (Cómo prevenir la homosexualidad), and Gender Confusion in Childhood (La confusión de género en la infancia). Major Spanish department store El Corte Inglés was threatened with a boycott by the United Left coalition over its stocking of the works, but continued to market them in 2014.

Nicolosi died in March 2017 at the age of 70 from flu complications.

On July 2, 2019, leading online book retailer Amazon removed several of Nicolosi's books from their catalog, including the 2002 publication A Parent's Guide to Preventing Homosexuality, following a Change.org petition requesting that they do so.

Nicolosi's NARTH continues to exist as "The Alliance for Therapeutic Choice and Scientific Integrity", headed by his son Joseph Nicolosi Jr. Nicolosi Jr. coined the term "reintegrative therapy" for his own approach which he says is distinct from conversion therapy.

== Effectiveness ==
In 2017, psychology professor Warren Throckmorton said that Nicolosi had earlier been offered the chance to assess the viability of his therapy by J. Michael Bailey, a professor of psychology best known for his sexual orientation research. Bailey informed Nicolosi that he could bring his patients to his lab at Northwestern University to test their automatic responses to erotic cues, i.e. men versus women. Throckmorton wrote that "Nicolosi never took him up on the offer" and that Bailey confirmed the offer was still open. Bailey told Throckmorton that "pre (or even mid) treatment [brain] scans compared with post-treatment scans would help to offset the lack of a control group". In a prominent 2016 academic review, Bailey also critiqued Nicolosi's claims of success, noting that earlier research by Kurt Freund found that men's claims of sexual re-orientation were not supported by phallometric assessments, which measure penile blood-flow in response to imagery. Additionally Bailey notes that Conrad and Wincze found that physiological arousal measurements did not support the positive reports of men who had participated in sexual-reorientation therapy. They were still attracted to and aroused by men.

Like all forms of conversion therapy, reparative therapy is pseudoscientific, opposed by mainstream medical and psychological practitioners, and potentially harmful to patients. Some states have enacted laws against conversion therapy.

== Publications ==
- Nicolosi, Joseph (1991). Reparative Therapy of Male Homosexuality: A New Clinical Approach. Jason Aronson, Inc. ISBN 0-87668-545-9.
- Nicolosi, Joseph (1993). Healing Homosexuality: Case Stories of Reparative Therapy. Jason Aronson, Inc. ISBN 0-7657-0144-8.
- Nicolosi, Joseph; Byrd, A. Dean; Potts, Richard W. (June 2000). "Retrospective self-reports of changes in homosexual orientation: A consumer survey of conversion therapy clients". Psychological Reports. 86 (3 Pt 2): 1071–1088. doi:10.2466/pr0.2000.86.3c.1071. PMID 10932560. S2CID 36702477.
- Nicolosi, Joseph (2002). "A meta-analytic review of treatment of homosexuality". Psychological Reports. 90 (3 Pt 2): 1139–52. doi:10.2466/pr0.2002.90.3c.1139. PMID 12150399. S2CID 12258324. Archived from the original on July 16, 2011.
- Nicolosi, Joseph & Nicolosi, Linda Ames (2002). A Parent's Guide to Preventing Homosexuality. InterVarsity Press. ISBN 0-8308-2379-4.
- Nicolosi, Joseph (2002). "A critique of Bem's "exotic becomes erotic" theory of sexual orientation development". Psychological Reports. 90 (3 Pt 1): 931–46. doi:10.2466/pr0.2002.90.3.931. PMID 12090531. S2CID 33615927. Archived from the original on July 16, 2011.
- Nicolosi, Joseph (2008). "Clients' perceptions of how reorientation therapy and self-help can promote changes in sexual orientation". Psychological Reports. 102 (1): 3–28. doi:10.2466/pr0.102.1.3-28. PMID 18481660. S2CID 32561174. Archived from the original on July 16, 2011.
- Nicolosi, Joseph (2009). Shame and Attachment Loss: The Practical Work of Reparative Therapy. InterVarsity Press
- Nicolosi, Joseph (2017). A Parent's Guide to Preventing Homosexuality, revised edition. Liberal Mind Publishers
