= Charles LiMandri =

American lawyer (born 1955)

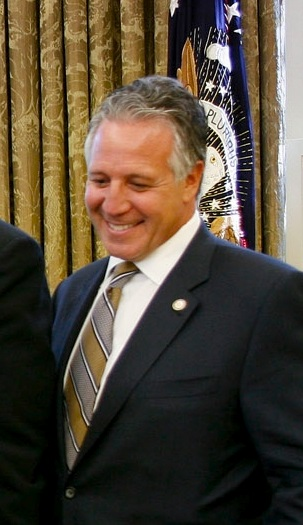
- Charles LiMandri at the White House in 2006
- Born: 1955 (age 70–71); San Diego, California
- Education: University of San Diego; Georgetown University Law Center
- Occupation: Attorney
- Organizations: LiMandri & Jonna LLP; Freedom of Conscience Defense Fund
- Spouse: Barbara
- Children: 5

Charles LiMandri (born 1955) is an American lawyer. In a case that made national headlines, he litigated against the American Civil Liberties Union (ACLU) in the defense of the Mount Soledad Cross in San Diego. The battle over the religious symbol, which lasted more than 25 years, is one of the longest in the history on the United States. Limandri has a private law practice, and in 2002 he founded the Freedom of Conscience Defense Fund to pay for his pro bono work on behalf of religious freedom.

== Early life and education ==
LiMandri was born in San Diego, California, in 1955. He attended Catholic primary and secondary schools, and graduated from Saint Augustine High School in 1973. His undergraduate studies were taken at the University of San Diego (USD), also a Catholic school. In 1977 LiMandri completed his graduate studies at USD. He returned to Saint Augustine High School for a brief period to work as a teacher and wrestling coach. Then he began his graduate work at Georgetown Law. During this period he spent a year studying abroad in England at Oxford University.

== Career ==
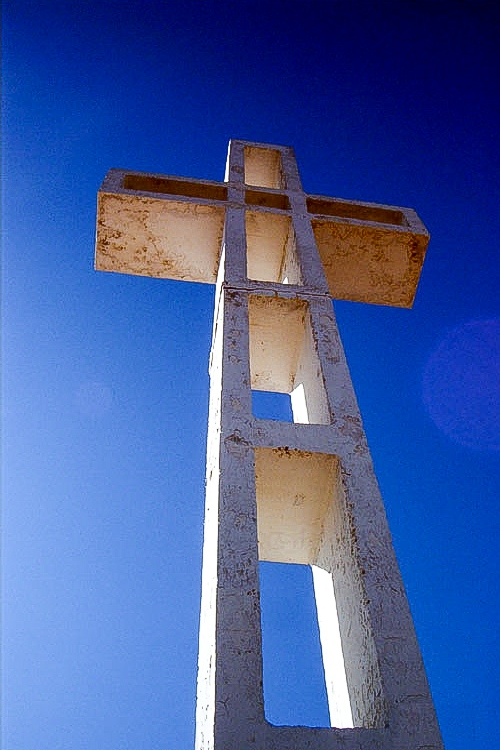
Mount Soledad Cross

=== Legal practice ===
LiMandri started practicing law in San Diego in 1985. His primary areas are business law and personal injury. As of 2015, five attorneys are on staff at his law firm.

His first venture into religious freedom casework came in 2003 when he filed an amicus brief in a case to keep "Under God" in the Pledge of Allegiance. In the lawsuit, Elk Grove Unified School District v. Newdow, the United States Supreme Court ruled against Newdow.

The effort by the ACLU to remove the Mount Soledad Cross began in 1998. Erected in 1954, the 43-foot (13 m) tall mountaintop cross is a familiar San Diego landmark. LiMandri's involvement began in 2004. For the next twelve years the case worked its way through the state and federal judiciaries until ownership by a private organization was established in 2016 ending the claim of unconstitutionality. LiMandri's efforts to prevent the removal of the cross drew national attention and is his most high-profile case.

In 2007, LiMandri brought a lawsuit against the City of San Diego when they forced four firefighters to drive their fire truck in the annual gay pride parade against their deeply held religious beliefs. At the parade the firefighters were sexually harassed. In a jury trial, the verdict was returned in favor of the firefighters. In 2011 the verdict was affirmed by the California Supreme Court.

At the 2009 Miss USA pageant, then-Miss California Carrie Prejean was asked about same-sex marriage. Her reply, "I believe that marriage should be between a man and a woman", caused controversy. When the Miss California USA Pageant fired Prejean on an unrelated violation of her contract, LiMandri filed a lawsuit on her behalf; the pageant then filled a counter-suit. After a homemade sex video depicting Prejean surfaced, both parties agreed to an undisclosed settlement.

=== Freedom of Conscience Defense Fund ===
We're trying to preserve a Judeo-Christian culture which permeates society. There's no financial incentive. But there’s a big incentive to better society for future generations.

— Charles LiMandri on defending religious freedom

In 2012 LiMandri founded the Freedom of Conscience Defense Fund (FCDF) to help fund his pro bono work on behalf of religious freedom. FCDF's mission is to provide "pro bono legal services and spearheads educational initiatives on issues related to religious freedom, bioethics, and family values." FCDF is an allied firm with Alliance Defending Freedom, the Christian legal group. Maggie Gallagher, former chairman of National Organization for Marriage, is a boardmember.

=== Other cases ===
LiMandri represented the Jewish organization JONAH (Jews Offering New Alternatives for Healing) from 2012 to 2015 in the case Ferguson v. JONAH. In 2012, the Southern Poverty Law Center filed suit against JONAH, alleging that the organization had violated New Jersey's consumer fraud law by offering conversion therapy to gay men and women. The case went to trial in June 2015 and the jury found JONAH liable for consumer fraud and unconscionable business practices.

"What was your name?" is a 2014 song by singer-songwriter Joyce Bartholomew. She said the song was inspired by an epiphany: "There has been 58 million abortions since 1973... and how many babies have been aborted and killed, and who would they have become if they had been given a chance?" The song's music video had received 52,000 views on YouTube when the website deleted the video, stating that it had been "removed because its content violated YouTube's Terms of Service." LiMandri brought suit against YouTube on Bartholomew's behalf for libel. The Sixth District Court of Appeal ruled against Bartholomew, but the video was eventually restored.

In 2017 two women entered Cathy Miller's cakeshop, Tastries Bakery, and requested a wedding cake for their same-sex wedding. Miller refused to create the custom cake due to her deeply held religious beliefs and the state sought a court order to force her to bake the cake. The case is similar to one currently before the Supreme Court Masterpiece Cakeshop v. Colorado Civil Rights Commission. On February 5, 2018, a judge of the Superior Court of California agreed with LiMandri's Free Speech argument and issued a preliminary ruling in favor of Miller to which LiMandri said was a "significant victory for faith and freedom."

== Personal life ==
LiMandri met his wife, Barbara, when she was working as a paralegal. The couple have five children. LiMandri is a devout Catholic.
