= Ferguson v. JONAH =

LGBT civil rights case

- Court: New Jersey Superior Court
- Full case name: Michael Ferguson et al., v. JONAH et al.
- Argued: June 3 to June 25, 2015
- Decided: June 25, 2015
- Citation: No. L-5473-12 (N.J. Super. Ct. Law Div. 2015)
- Transcript: Equality Case Files Unofficial Transcripts

Holding
- A jury found that claims to convert clients from gay to straight violated consumer fraud protections and was unconscionable.

Court membership
- Chief judge: Peter F. Bariso Jr.

Case opinions
- Decision by: Jury

Laws applied
- Consumer Fraud Act, N.J.S.A., §56:8-2, et seq.

Keywords
- LGBT, Conversion Therapy

Ferguson v. JONAH, New Jersey Superior Court No. L-5473-12 (N.J. Super. Ct. Law Div. 2015) is a landmark LGBT civil rights case in which a New Jersey jury unanimously determined that conversion therapy, also called "reparative therapy," "reorientation therapy," or "ex-gay therapy" constituted consumer fraud.

The lawsuit accused Jews Offering New Alternatives to Homosexuality or JONAH (which changed its name to Jews Offering New Alternatives for Healing) of consumer fraud for selling services that they claimed could change a person from gay to straight. This case was a first-of-its-kind lawsuit to use consumer protection laws to legally challenge the practice of conversion therapy. The Southern Poverty Law Center filed the case in November 2012 and the case went to trial on June 3, 2015. A pretrial ruling by the Court declared for the first time in American history that homosexuality was not a mental disease, disorder, or equivalent thereof as a matter of law. On June 25, 2015, after a three-week trial, the jury unanimously found the defendants liable for consumer fraud and unconscionable business practices, ordered JONAH to pay $72,400 to compensate the plaintiffs plus an undisclosed amount for attorney's fees, ordered that JONAH be permanently closed, and forbade the defendants from ever starting a similar organization in New Jersey.

== Background ==
Conversion therapy, also called sexual orientation change efforts, has a long history in the United States. Conversion therapy claims to help people, usually gay men, overcome their unwanted homosexual attractions, thereby “converting” them from gay to straight. Today, all major American medical, psychiatric, physiological, and professional counseling organizations discredit and staunchly criticize conversion therapy.

== Pretrial matters ==
In July 2010, a video published by the organization Truth Wins Out features two former participants of JONAH, Ben Unger and Chaim Levin, alleging that Alan Downing, a life coach connected with JONAH, demanded that his participants strip off all of their clothing in front of a mirror and touch their genitals in his presence. Downing released a statement in response denying the charges. After emails were sent to the Association of Orthodox Jewish Scientists linking to the video, the organization initially rescinded a previous invitation to JONAH's founder Arthur Goldberg to speak at their annual convention, but later allowed him to speak. Yael Respler of The Jewish Press printed a letter by Goldberg about the incident and noted in response that she herself had engaged in reparative therapy (also called conversion therapy).

In November 2012, the Southern Poverty Law Center filed suit against JONAH, Arthur Goldberg, and Alan Downing on behalf of Michael Ferguson, Ben Unger, Chaim Levin, and two of the participants' mothers for fraudulent practices which are illegal under New Jersey's consumer protection laws.

Five plaintiffs were represented by the Southern Poverty Law Center, Cleary Gottlieb Steen & Hamilton LLP, and Lite DePalma Greenberg LLC. The named plaintiff, Michael Ferguson, had grown up in a conservative Mormon household and had been a client of JONAH. Two additional former clients, Benjamin Unger and Chaim Levin, had both grown up in an Orthodox Jewish community in Brooklyn. All three were consumers of conversion therapy offered by JONAH.

Charles LiMandri of the Freedom of Conscience Defense Fund, who had been a one-time counsel to the National Organization for Marriage, represented the three defendants.

JONAH challenged the veracity of the plaintiffs' allegations.

In 2014, Superior Court Judge Peter Bariso ruled that JONAH and its co-defendants could have to pay three times the cost paid by the participants for therapy they said they needed because of JONAH's conversion therapy.

In February 2015, Judge Bariso ruled that JONAH's claims of gay conversion therapy that describe homosexuality as a curable mental disorder were illegal based on the state's Consumer Fraud Act. Judge Bariso also said it is fraudulent to offer "success statistics" because "there is no factual basis for calculating such statistics". The judge also excluded expert testimony from leading conversion therapy proponents, Joseph Nicolosi and Christopher Doyle, ruling that their opinions were based on the false premise that homosexuality is a disorder. Bariso wrote that "the theory that homosexuality is a disorder is not novel but – like the notion that the earth is flat and the sun revolves around it – instead is outdated and refuted".

In response to Judge Bariso's ruling, David Dinielli, deputy legal director for the Southern Poverty Law Center, said, "This is the principal lie the conversion therapy industry uses throughout the country to peddle its quackery to vulnerable clients. Gay people don't need to be cured, and we are thrilled that the court has recognized this".

== Trial ==
On 25 June 2015, in the first-ever trial of conversion therapy in the United States, a New Jersey jury found JONAH guilty of consumer fraud for promising to be able to change its clients' sexual urges and determined its commercial practices to be unconscionable. The jury voted unanimously to convict JONAH under the Consumer Fraud Act of New Jersey. The verdict required JONAH and Downing to refund thousands of dollars paid by former clients. David Dinielli, SPLC deputy legal director said, "this verdict is a monumental moment in the movement to ensure the rights and acceptance of LGBT people in America".

=== Permanent injunction ===
In December 2015, the parties entered into a settlement agreement that required JONAH to shut down entirely and prohibited founder Arthur Goldberg and counselor Alan Downing from engaging in any form of conversion therapy in New Jersey.

== Aftermath ==
Eleven days after the verdict, JONAH was reincorporated as JIFGA, "Jewish Institute for Global Awareness", keeping JONAH's assets, leadership and operations, as well as the same address and phone number. The Southern Poverty Law Center says that this is an attempt to evade the shutdown order and has appealed to the courts to enforce the previous ruling against JIFGA. In June 2019, Judge Bariso found that JIFGA was an illegitimate attempt to continue JONAH in violation of the court order. He ordered JIFGA to shut down within thirty days and pay a $3.5 million fine to victims of the scam. The judge forbade Arthur Goldberg and Elaine Berk from serving in executive leadership or on the board of any nonprofit organization.

== Legal analysis ==
In a lengthy analysis published in Northwestern University Law Review, attorney Peter R. Dubrowski reviewed the strengths of the case and provided a fifty-state survey of state consumer protection laws that could be used to structure a claim similar to those in the JONAH case. Dubrowski wrote that "one state trial court decision in New Jersey creates neither binding precedent nor guaranteed success in future suits against conversion therapists. The case, however, was envisioned as—and is—a powerful model to consider in building future lawsuits."
