= Chiles v. Salazar =

- Supreme Court of the United States

Argued October 7, 2025 Decided March 31, 2026
- Full case name: Kaley Chiles, Petitioner v. Patty Salazar, in Her Official Capacity as Executive Director of the Colorado Department of Regulatory Agencies, et al.
- Docket no.: 24-539
- Citations: 607 U.S. ___ (more)
- Argument: Oral argument

Case history
- Prior: Motion for a preliminary injunction denied. Chiles v. Salazar, No. 22-cv-2287 (D. Colo. 2022).; Judgment affirmed. 116 F.4th 1178 (10th Cir. 2024).; Cert. granted. 604 U.S. 1193 (2025).

Holding
- The First Amendment to the United States Constitution requires strict scrutiny review of a state's policy of using its licensing power to restrict topics that therapists may discuss with clients.

Court membership
- Chief Justice John Roberts Associate Justices Clarence Thomas · Samuel Alito; Sonia Sotomayor · Elena Kagan; Neil Gorsuch · Brett Kavanaugh; Amy Coney Barrett · Ketanji Brown Jackson

Case opinions
- Majority: Gorsuch, joined by Roberts, Thomas, Alito, Sotomayor, Kagan, Kavanaugh, Barrett
- Concurrence: Kagan, joined by Sotomayor
- Dissent: Jackson

Laws applied
- U.S. Const. amend. I

Chiles v. Salazar, 607 U.S. ___ (2026), is a United States Supreme Court case which ruled that the First Amendment to the United States Constitution requires strict scrutiny be applied to laws passed by states that restrict what topics therapists may discuss with clients, specifically referring to Colorado's Minor Conversion Therapy Law (MCTL) that banned conversion therapy on minors by licensed mental health professionals.

The ban was challenged by a licensed therapist who alleged it was a violation of the First Amendment, as the therapist only talked with their patients. The state defended the ban by claiming that it was constrained to licensed professionals and only as with respect to their professional duties. The ban was upheld in lower courts, but the Supreme Court ruling, decided 8–1 in March 2026, reversed the lower courts rulings and remanded the case to be reviewed as-applied under strict scrutiny; as such, speech-only therapy is considered to be protected speech under the First Amendment.

== Background ==
Colorado's Minor Conversion Therapy Law (MCTL), passed in 2019, prohibits licensed mental health professionals from engaging in "conversion therapy" with clients under 18 with an exemption for therapists "engaged in the practice of religious ministry". Conversion therapy refers to practices aiming to change an individual's sexual orientation or gender identity. Over 20 states have similar laws which are supported by major medical organizations. The Supreme Court has turned down earlier cases challenging state bans on conversion therapy.

Colorado's law specifically banned conversion therapy only in the context of helping a patient's gender identity reflect their sex. It did not restrain therapists from helping a patient to embrace a gender identity different than his or her sex.

The plaintiff, Kaley Chiles, is a licensed professional counselor in Colorado. In her petition to the Court, she stated that as "a practicing Christian, Chiles believes that people flourish when they live consistently with God's design, including their biological sex." Her lawsuit says she wants to help patients that already have the goal of "seeking to reduce or eliminate unwanted sexual attractions, change sexual behaviors or grow in the experience of harmony with one's physical body". She contended that the law violated the Free Speech and Free Exercise Clauses of the First Amendment. However, the law already made exceptions for therapists who "engaged in the practice of religious ministry."

Chiles was represented by the Alliance Defending Freedom (ADF), a conservative legal advocacy group that advocates for the rights of Christians. ADF has successfully argued before the Supreme Court in cases such as 303 Creative LLC v. Elenis and National Institute of Family and Life Advocates v. Becerra. The group's president, Kristen Waggoner, stated, "The government has no business censoring private conversations between clients and counselors, nor should a counselor be used as a tool to impose the government's biased views on her clients."

A 2023 report by The Trevor Project stated that there were over 1,300 active conversion therapists operating in 48 U.S. states, with 600+ of these practitioners holding active professional licenses.

A 2024 survey by The Trevor Project found that among more than 50,000 LGBTQ Americans ages 13–24 surveyed, 5% had undergone conversion therapy. The 5% share in 2024 is a decrease from 10% in 2020 which had undergone conversion therapy, indicating that the practice had declined as more states enacted bans on it.

== Lower court history ==
Chiles filed a pre-enforcement challenge against the MCTL, asserting violations of the Free Speech and Free Exercise Clauses of the First Amendment. She sought a preliminary injunction to prevent the law's enforcement. The U.S. District Court for the District of Colorado denied her motion, finding that, while she had standing, she failed to demonstrate a likelihood of success on the merits. The Court concluded that the MCTL regulates health-care professional conduct rather than therapists' speech.

Chiles appealed the district court's decision to the U.S. Court of Appeals for the Tenth Circuit. A 3-judge panel of the Tenth Circuit affirmed the lower court's ruling, agreeing that Colorado was entitled to regulate professional conduct even if it had an "incidental" effect on Chiles' speech. The court cited evidence that conversion therapy can harm minors. Judge Harris Hartz dissented, arguing "courts must be particularly wary that in a contentious and evolving field, the government and its supporters would like to bypass the marketplace of ideas and declare victory for their preferred ideas by fiat".

== Supreme Court ==
Following the Tenth Circuit's decision, Chiles petitioned the U.S. Supreme Court for certiorari, arguing that the MCTL violates her First Amendment rights by censoring certain conversations between counselors and their clients based on the viewpoints expressed. She contended that governments do not have greater authority to regulate speech simply because the speaker is licensed or providing specialized advice.

On March 10, 2025, the Supreme Court granted certiorari to review the case, signaling intent to address the constitutional questions surrounding the regulation of professional speech and the balance between state regulatory power and free speech rights within professional contexts.

According to experts interviewed by The Guardian, the ADF's petition to the Supreme Court "profoundly misrepresented" their research cited in the ADF report on the possible psychological damage of conversion therapy.

=== Oral arguments ===
Oral arguments were held on October 7, 2025. Journalists covering the Court believed from the questions asked that the conservative majority would likely find the ban unconstitutional, having given more weight to the First Amendment issues than the state's concern on the practice.

=== Ruling ===
The Court held 8–1 in a majority by Justice Gorsuch that the law regulates speech based on viewpoint, and must be assessed under strict scrutiny. Justices Kagan and Sotomayor wrote a concurring opinion in addition to joining the Opinion of the Court, while Justice Jackson was the only one to dissent. The case was remanded to apply this level of scrutiny to the Colorado law. Gorsuch wrote in his majority opinion that "Colorado may regard its policy as essential to public health and safety. … But the First Amendment stands as a shield against any effort to enforce orthodoxy in thought or speech in this country. However well-intentioned, any law that suppresses speech based on viewpoint represents an 'egregious' assault on both of those commitments."

Kagan and Sotomayor said in their concurrence that while they agreed that the Colorado law was unconstitutional due to it controlling speech based on viewpoint, things would have been much more difficult to decide if the law had been "viewpoint-neutral". Given that the law was in fact not "viewpoint-neutral", they joined the majority opinion in full.

Jackson argued in her dissent that "blocking Colorado from regulating speech uttered for purposes of providing medical treatment … opens a dangerous can of worms" and "threatens to impair States' ability to regulate the provision of medical care in any respect."

While the court ruled that the Colorado state law must be reviewed as-applied under strict scrutiny, neither side disputed Colorado's authority to regulate medical treatments and providers or claimed that a state doing so is unconstitutional. The verdict also did not strike down conversion therapy bans on minors in other states.

== Analysis ==
The ruling in Chiles was expected to sharply limit states' ability to oversee speech-based therapies. With such speech-based therapy treated as free speech rather than medical treatment, it becomes harder for states to define and enforce what counts as accepted professional practice. Without a clear "standard of care" definition, therapists might not know whether certain interventions are legally allowed.

Other arguments framed the case as a fundamental debate over medical expertise as a whole. Vox suggested that the Court may undermine medical authority in its questioning of expert consensus: "It would arguably be inconsistent for the Court to allow some states to prohibit specific forms of gender-affirming healthcare [as ruled in United States v. Skrmetti in 2025] because they believe it's harmful, while stopping other states from prohibiting conversion therapy because they believe it's harmful [in Chiles v. Salazar]." Skrmetti was a case from 2025 that upheld restrictions on actual medical procedures, whereas Chiles involved speech alone.

Several commentators saw the decision's timing, on the International Transgender Day of Visibility (hosted every year on March 31), as a political statement by SCOTUS.

== Aftermath ==
In May 2026, Colorado passed an amendment to its conversion therapy ban in order to comply with the ruling, redefining conversion therapy as "direct[ing] a patient toward a predetermined sexual orientation or gender identity outcome, or eliminate or reduce attractions toward individuals of a particular sex or gender."

== See also ==
- Free speech in the United States
- List of LGBTQ-related cases in the United States Supreme Court
- United States v. Skrmetti
- 2020s anti-LGBTQ movement in the United States
- Conversion therapy in the United States
