= Pickup v. Brown and Welch v. Brown =

Pickup v. Brown (12-17681) and Welch v. Brown (13-15023) are 2012 lawsuits in the United States challenging the constitutionality of California Senate bill SB 1172, which banned conversion therapy (therapy aimed at changing sexual orientation) on children under the age of 18, effective January 2013.

The lead plaintiff in Pickup is David Pickup, a conversion therapist and spokesman for the National Association for Research & Therapy of Homosexuality. Additional plaintiffs include several conversion therapy practitioners, two anonymous minors, and two anonymous parents. The defendants in the case include the Governor of California Jerry Brown, the Secretary of the State and Consumer Services Agency, the Executive Officer of the California Board of Behavioral Sciences, the President of the California Board of Psychology, and the President of the Medical Board of California, all in their official capacities.

In December 2012, the district court judge hearing Pickup declined to issue an injunction blocking SB 1172, but the judge hearing Welch did issue an injunction. Both cases were appealed to the Ninth Circuit and consolidated. The circuit court heard oral arguments in the cases on April 17, 2013, and on August 29 upheld SB 1172 and reversed the lower court order granting a preliminary injunction. "The plaintiffs in the case asked the Supreme Court of the United States to review the Ninth Circuit's decision. However, on June 30, 2014, the Supreme Court declined to grant review, sending the law into effect." The Supreme Court in National Institute of Family and Life Advocates v. Becerra, 585 U.S. ___ (2018) explicitly referenced a specific line of argument in this case relating to the standard of scrutiny that should be afforded to regulations of professional speech. The Ninth Circuit held that conversion therapy was a form of professional conduct, not speech. The Supreme Court interpreted the Ninth Circuit's decision as creating a new category of "Professional Speech" (i.e. that made in the confines of a professional relationship) that was not subject to strict scrutiny. The Supreme Court held that it "had not recognized "professional speech" as a separate category of speech" and that strict scrutiny applied. Notably, the phrase "Professional Speech" does not appear anywhere in the Ninth Circuit's original decision.

On November 20, 2020, The Eleventh Circuit in Otto v. City of Boca Raton, FL, applying strict scrutiny as required under the 2018 Supreme Court case, held that the bans implemented by the City and County defendants did not pass strict scrutiny.

== See also ==
- LGBT rights in California
- List of U.S. jurisdictions banning conversion therapy for minors
- National Institute of Family and Life Advocates v. Becerra
