= Alliance for Therapeutic Choice and Scientific Integrity =

U.S. nonprofit organization promoting conversion therapy

- Formation: 1992; 34 years ago
- Founders: Benjamin Kaufman; Joseph Nicolosi; Charles Socarides
- Tax ID no.: 47-1045468 (currently); 13-3746962 (formerly)
- Legal status: 501(c)(3) nonprofit organization
- Board of directors: David H. Pickup (President); Robert L. Vazzo (Treasurer); Anthony Duk (Co-secretary); Andrew Rodriguez (Co-secretary); Michael Davidson; Christopher H. Rosik
- Revenue: $110,241 (2025)
- Expenses: $60,763 (2025)
- Formerly called: National Association for Research & Therapy of Homosexuality

The Alliance for Therapeutic Choice and Scientific Integrity (ATCSI), also known as the NARTH Institute, is a United States-based nonprofit organization that promotes conversion therapy—a pseudoscientific, harmful, and ineffective practice intended to change one's sexual orientation, gender identity, or gender expression to fit societal norms. ATCSI's promotion of conversion therapy as a scientifically supported therapeutic method is contradicted by overwhelming scientific consensus. As of 2021, ATCSI has not been recognized by any major United States–based professional association, and no schools, universities or professional programs train its counselors in conversion therapy.

ATCSI was founded in 1992 by Joseph Nicolosi, Benjamin Kaufman, and Charles Socarides. Until 2014, it was known as the National Association for Research & Therapy of Homosexuality, and its headquarters were in Encino, California, at its Thomas Aquinas Psychological Clinic. As of 2026, the organization's official website directs mail and other deliveries to a private mailbox in Murrieta, California.

== History ==
ATCSI was founded in 1992 by Benjamin Kaufman, Charles Socarides, and Joseph Nicolosi. In an article titled In Defense of the Need for Honest Dialogue, co-founder Kaufman explained that ATCSI was founded due to the American Psychiatric Association, and similar professional organizations, "had totally stifled the scientific inquiry that would be necessary to stimulate a discussion" about homosexuality.

In July 2011, ATCSI failed to pay its dues to the California Board for Behavioral Sciences and was removed from the list of groups that provide continuing education credits to therapists in California.

The organization had 501(c)(3) tax-exempt status under its former employer identification number (13-3746962); the Internal Revenue Service (IRS) revoked this status on September 15, 2012 for failure to file three consecutive nonprofit tax returns. The IRS subsequently restored the organization's 501(c)(3) status under a newly issued employer identification number (47-1045468), effective May 15, 2017.

== Activities ==
ATCSI claims to be a secular organization, differentiating it from other ex-gay groups that are primarily religious in nature. Nevertheless, ATCSI often partners with religious groups, such as Jews Offering New Alternatives for Healing, Joel 2:25 International, Evergreen International, and the Church of Jesus Christ of Latter-day Saints. The Evergreen website has referenced the therapeutic methods of ATCSI founder Joseph Nicolosi as "beneficial". Nicolosi worked with Evergreen's A. Dean Byrd to co-author several papers on conversion therapy. Byrd also served as president of ATCSI and also published an article in the LDS church's September 1999 Ensign.

== Controversy ==
=== Stances on the etiology and mutability of homosexuality ===
The founders held that homosexuality is a treatable mental illness and that a person's sexual orientation can be changed through therapy. Such conversion therapy is pseudoscientific, harmful, and unethical according to major medical and psychological organisations in the United States and elsewhere. Socarides in particular said in the mid-1990s that he had treated about a thousand homosexual patients, and cured over a third by dealing with the parental causes of an absent father and overbearing mother.

Claims that pathologize homosexuality and state that it can be changed through therapy have been denounced by almost every major US medical association, including the American Medical Association and the American Psychiatric Association. In 2006, the American Psychological Association declared that ATCSI created "an environment in which prejudice and discrimination can flourish". The Southern Poverty Law Center (SPLC) singled the group out as a main source of junk science used by hate groups to justify anti-gay rhetoric.

=== Abba Goldberg ===
In 2010, ATCSI's executive secretary Abba Goldberg disclosed a 1991 criminal conviction for conspiracy and fraud, for which he served 18 months in prison.

=== George Rekers ===
George Rekers, a conversion therapy practitioner, was an officer of and scientific advisor to ATCSI. Rekers has testified in court that homosexuality is destructive, and has testified against parenthood by gay and lesbian people in a number of court cases involving organizations and state agencies working with children. In May 2010, Rekers employed a male prostitute as a travel companion for a two-week vacation in Europe. Rekers denied any inappropriate conduct and suggestions that he was gay. The male escort told CNN he had given Rekers "sexual massages" while traveling together in Europe. Rekers subsequently resigned from the board of ATCSI.

=== Gerald Schoenewolf ===
In April 2005, ATCSI published on its website an essay titled Gay Rights and Political Correctness: A Brief History, written by Gerald Schoenewolf, a member of ATCSI's Science Advisory Committee. The essay made several controversial claims, including that the civil rights and gay rights movements were "destructive", that the American Psychological Association had "been taken over by extremist gays", and that Africans were fortunate to have been sold into slavery. The SPLC called it an angry polemic that made outrageous historical claims and criticized both ATCSI and Schoenewolf. The essay drew little attention until a letter of protest was presented to ATCSI by the National Black Justice Coalition in mid-September 2006. On October 6, 2006, ATCSI published a statement: "NARTH regrets the comments made by Dr. Schoenewolf about slavery which have been misconstrued by some of our readers."

== See also ==
- Biology and sexual orientation
- Environment and sexual orientation
- Homosexuality and psychology
- International Federation for Therapeutic and Counseling Choice
