= Viewpoint discrimination =

Discrimination based on point of view

Viewpoint discrimination is a concept in United States jurisprudence related to the First Amendment to the United States Constitution. If a speech act is treated differently by a government entity based on the viewpoint it expresses, this is considered viewpoint discrimination.

== Cases ==
In the Albanese case, Judge Richard Leon accepted, among other things, the arguments of those who considered it likely that the sanctions against Francesca Albanese were motivated by her political opinions: the judge stated that “Albanese has done nothing more than speak”.

== See also ==
- Political bias
- Political repression
- Political violence
