= Arthur A. Goldberg =

American businessman and fraudster

Arthur Abba Goldberg (born 1940) is an American businessman, convicted fraudster, and leader in the ex-gay movement. He is co-founder and co-director of Jews Offering New Alternatives for Healing (JONAH) and president of Positive Alternatives to Homosexuality (PATH).

== Education ==
He received his B.A. majoring in Government, with a minor in English from American University with general honors, and a J.D. from Cornell University where he wrote for the Cornell Law Review and was also the editor of the Cornell Law Forum from 1964 to 1965. He was a professor at the University of Connecticut School of Law and Deputy Attorney General of New Jersey. He was licensed to practice law in both New Jersey and Connecticut.

== Views on homosexuality ==
While attending New York University, Goldberg's son and the son of Elaine Berk both came out as gay. Goldberg and Berk found that much of the ex-gay movement was strongly associated with charismatic Christianity. Wanting a spiritual alternative for same-sex attracted Jews, they co-founded Jews Offering New Alternatives for Healing (JONAH). In the 1960s, Goldberg traveled to the American South, and now "employs the language of civil rights to argue that people should have the right to change their sexuality."

Goldberg "uses Jewish law texts and scientific study to get to the individual root causes of same sex attraction and help those who are unhappy with their lifestyle reassert their gender identity and change their life." In 2008, he wrote Light in the Closet: Torah, Homosexuality, and the Power to Change. In the book, Goldberg claims that there is no genetic cause of homosexuality, and argues that homosexual orientation can be changed through reparative therapy. In 2012, former clients of JONAH represented by the Southern Poverty Law Center and two other law firms, sued JONAH and its founders for consumer fraud. After drawn-out court proceedings, the former clients won in December 2015. The New Jersey Superior court ordered JONAH to close and liquidate its assets by June 2016. But 11 days after the jury found JONAH guilty, its founders, Arthur Goldberg and Elaine Berk, opened a new nonprofit: the Jewish Institute for Global Awareness, or JIFGA (which was actually a recycled acronym; the two had previously called their organization the “Jonah Institute for Gender Affirmation”). JIFGA filed for nonprofit status using JONAH’s old address and phone number. The legal team behind the original lawsuit filed a motion on March 28, 2018 urging the New Jersey court to enforce its original ruling. They allege that JIFGA’s operations are “indistinguishable” from JONAH’s—that it is carrying on as though no court order had happened. JONAH’s lawyers responded that, yes, their clients were providing referrals to therapists under the new name, and that JIFGA’s new clients “most likely” include individuals “seeking assistance with “same-sex attraction.”

== Business activities and conviction for fraud ==
In the 1980s, Goldberg was well known on Wall Street

As Executive Vice President and a major stockholder of Matthews & Wright Inc., a Wall Street investment bank, he orchestrated a massive fraud from 1984 to 1986 in which the firm sold over $2 billion of fraudulent municipal bonds for several cities. The victims were mostly impoverished communities with large minority populations—such as the territory of Guam; East St. Louis, Illinois; East Chicago Heights, Illinois; Chester, Pennsylvania and Sac and Fox Reservation in Oklahoma. Goldberg and his associate, Frederick Mann, netted $11 million in unlawful profits from the scheme.

The Philadelphia Inquirer exposed the scam in a series of articles in 1987. In December 1987, a federal grand jury in Guam indicted Goldberg and Mann on 52 counts of bribery, conspiracy and fraud. Soon afterward, federal authorities were forced to transfer the case to the United States District Court for the Central District of California; so many of Guam's residents had been defrauded that it would have been impossible to empanel a jury. He was indicted on separate charges in Illinois soon afterward.

Facing the prospect of spending the rest of his life in prison, in July 1989 Goldberg pleaded guilty in a Los Angeles federal court to three counts of mail fraud. Later that month, he pleaded guilty in an East St. Louis federal court to one count of conspiracy to defraud. In October 1989, Goldberg was sentenced to 18 months in federal prison and five years probation. He was also fined $400,000 (later reduced to $100,000 on appeal). In a separate action, the Securities and Exchange Commission banned Goldberg from the securities industry for life and ordered Matthews & Wright to permanently close its doors.

== Activism ==
Since the 1960s, Goldberg has been involved in community service and was active in resettling immigrants from Eastern Europe and the Soviet Union. In 1974, he founded the Committee for the Absorption of Soviet Emigres in Jersey City.

== See also ==
- Judaism and sexual orientation
