= Landor v. Louisiana Department of Corrections and Public Safety =

Landor v. Louisiana Department of Corrections
- Supreme Court of the United States

Argued November 10, 2025 Decided June 23, 2026
- Full case name: Damon Landor, Petitioner v. Louisiana Department of Corrections and Public Safety, et al.
- Docket no.: 23-1197

Case history
- Prior: Motion to dismiss granted. Landor v. Louisiana Department of Corrections and Public Safety, No. 21-cv-733 (M.D. La. 2022).; Affirmed. No. 22-30686 (5th Cir. 2024).; Cert. granted. 606 U.S. ___ (June 23, 2025).

Holding
- A state government employee may not be held liable in their personal capacity under a Spending Clause statute unless that person has voluntarily and knowingly consented to answer lawsuits under the statute.

Court membership
- Chief Justice John Roberts Associate Justices Clarence Thomas · Samuel Alito; Sonia Sotomayor · Elena Kagan; Neil Gorsuch · Brett Kavanaugh; Amy Coney Barrett · Ketanji Brown Jackson

Case opinions
- Majority: Gorsuch, joined by Roberts, Thomas, Alito, Kavanaugh, Barrett
- Dissent: Jackson, joined by Sotomayor, Kagan

Landor v. Louisiana Department of Corrections (No. 23-1197) is a United States Supreme Court decision that individuals may not be held liable in their personal capacities under a Spending Clause statute unless those individuals have voluntarily and knowingly consented to answer lawsuits under the statute.

While Landor filed the case under the Religious Land Use and Institutionalized Persons Act (RLUIPA), the Supreme Court's 6–3 holding may have significant implications for other federal statutes that rely on Congress's constitutional Spending Clause authority.

== Legal background ==
In 1990, the Supreme Court decided Employment Division v. Smith. Smith held that neutral, generally applicable laws that incidentally burden religious exercise do not violate the Free Exercise Clause of the First Amendment. In response, Congress passed the Religious Freedom Restoration Act (RFRA). RFRA provided that laws burdening religious free exercise must comport with strict scrutiny (i.e., the law must be the "least restrictive means" of achieving a "compelling interest"). In passing RFRA, Congress legislated using its enforcement powers under the Fourteenth Amendment.

In 1997, the Supreme Court decided City of Boerne v. Flores. Boerne held that Congress had exceeded its enforcement powers in passing RFRA as against state and local governments. In response, Congress passed the Religious Land Use and Institutionalized Persons Act (RLUIPA). RLUIPA preserved RFRA's strict scrutiny test, but tailored its application to land use regulations and the rights of institutionalized persons. RLUIPA relied on Congress's powers under the Spending Clause and the Commerce Clause, applying only where federal funds are involved, or where there is a sufficient nexus to interstate commerce.

In 2020, the Supreme Court decided Tanzin v. Tanvir. In Tanzin, the Court unanimously held that RFRA's provision allowing for “appropriate relief against the government” includes suits for monetary damages against officials acting under color of law.

== Background ==
Damon Landor is a devout Rastafarian. As a part of his religion, he refrained from cutting his hair. In 2020, Landor was incarcerated at two Louisiana correctional facilities that honored his religious vow and allowed him to keep his long hair. With three weeks left in his sentence, Landor was transferred to a third facility, the Raymond Laborde Correctional Center. At his intake, Landor explained his religious practice of wearing his hair long, going so far as to produce a copy of a Fifth Circuit decision which held unlawful Louisiana's practice of cutting Rastafarians' hair under RLUIPA. Nevertheless, Landor was carried into another room by two prison guards, handcuffed to a chair, restrained, and had his head shaved bald.

Upon his release, Landor brought suit in the Middle District of Louisiana against the Louisiana Department of Corrections and others under RLUIPA and §1983, alleging violations of his First, Eighth, and Fourteenth Amendment rights, along with other state-law torts. The district court granted the defendants' motion to dismiss, holding that RLUIPA did not authorize damages suits against officials in their individual capacities.

The United States Court of Appeals for the Fifth Circuit affirmed. While it condemned Landor's treatment at the hands of prison officials, it found that it was bound by prior circuit precedent foreclosing individual-capacity damages under RLUIPA. The panel also held that the Supreme Court's intervening decision in Tanzin did not abrogate that prior circuit precedent. The divided Court of Appeals denied rehearing en banc.

== Supreme Court ==
On May 3, 2024, Landor filed a petition for writ of certiorari. Several amicus curiae groups filed briefs in support of granting the petition. On June 23, 2025, the petition was granted. Oral arguments were held on November 10, 2025. On June 23, 2026, the Court ruled 6-3, dismissing Damon Landor's lawsuit seeking damages from individual Louisiana prison guards.

== Reactions ==
Steve Vladeck described Landor as "a massively important holding with constitutional dimensions—one that reflects the culmination of a long-term conservative legal project to weaken one of Congress’s most important regulatory powers; one that comes at the direct expense of private individuals for whom Congress has expressly created an array of federal statutory rights; and one that, as Justice Jackson's dissent details, is remarkably difficult to justify on almost any analytical terms."

Madiba K. Dennie of Balls & Strikes said, "The conservatives on the Court often posture as great defenders of religious rights. But in reality, they only care about the religious rights of some people. Damon Landor, a Rastafarian Black man who was incarcerated in Louisiana, isn’t one of them."

Erwin Chemerinsky wrote that Gorsuch rejected liability under the necessary and proper clause "by saying it would give Congress too much power."

Michael C. Dorf wrote that "as the Landor dissenters pointed out, RLUIPA and other Spending Clause legislation might be analogized to a contract, but that doesn’t mean it is a contract. It is a law."

Ian Millhiser wrote that the "decision most likely resolves an ongoing dispute about" emergency abortions under the Emergency Medical Treatment and Active Labor Act.

== See also ==
- Pennhurst State School and Hospital v. Halderman
- Medina v. Planned Parenthood South Atlantic
- United States v. Butler
- List of significant shadow docket decisions of the United States Supreme Court § Government grants
