= Religious exemption =

Legal privilege

A religious exemption or religious accommodation is a legal privilege that exempts members of a certain religion from a law, regulation, or requirement. Religious exemptions are often justified as a protection of religious freedom, and proponents of religious exemptions argue that complying with a law against one's faith is a greater harm than complying against a law that one otherwise disagrees with due to a fear of divine judgment. Opponents of religious exemptions argue that they mandate unequal treatment and undermine the rule of law.

== Issues ==
Many religions incorporate drug use into their practices or consider certain illegal drugs to be sacred. In areas where these drugs are illegal, religious groups may petition for a religious exemption. The use of cannabis is traditional in Rastafari, and the use of peyote is traditional for some Native American tribes. Laws governing alcohol may sometimes grant exceptions for practices such as Eucharist.

Religious opposition to medical procedures has prompted debate on religious exemptions in medicine. Many states in the United States allow for religious exemptions from vaccination. Jehovah's Witnesses have challenged child neglect laws that obligate the parent to provide medical assistance to their children.

Some religions have requirements on how adherents may dress or groom. Many governments require companies and organizations to provide exceptions for religious apparel that would typically violate a dress code. In many other places, certain religious articles of clothing are rendered illegal by laws governing public attire. Sikhism requires that adherents carry a kirpan, which often requires a religious exemption to laws regarding the carrying of weapons.

Churches, marriage officiants, and government employees that oppose same-sex marriage may in some places seek religious exemptions from involvement in such marriages.

Islam and Judaism both have specific traditions regarding the slaughter of animals. Some governments have made exemptions to their animal cruelty laws to permit these traditions.

== By country ==
=== Australia ===
Section 116 of the Constitution of Australia guarantees that the federal government shall not prohibit the free exercise of religion. Religious organizations are exempt from the Sex Discrimination Act 1984 and are legally permitted to discriminate based on sex, sexual orientation, gender identity, intersex status, relationship status, and pregnancy. A religious exemption in 1998 allowed members of the Church of Christ, Scientist to refuse child vaccination without losing welfare benefits, but the exemption was ended in 2015.

=== Canada ===
The Canadian Charter of Rights and Freedoms establishes a right to "freedom of conscience and religion". In 1985, the Supreme Court of Canada ruled that a business could not be compelled to close on Sunday for religious reasons in R v Big M Drug Mart Ltd. In 2004, the Supreme Court ruled that Hasidic Jews had the right to observe Sukkot on a condominium balcony against the wishes of the property owner.

=== United Kingdom ===
Under Article 9 of the Human Rights Act 1998, citizens of the United Kingdom are guaranteed the right to hold religious beliefs. The government reserves the power to legally restrict the expression of religious beliefs in the name of public safety, public order, health and morals, and the rights of others.

The House of Lords has ruled that dress codes banning religious accessories are undue but that a dress code banning a full body jilbāb is within reason. The English Court of Appeal has ruled in several cases that laws promoting equal rights outweigh the right to discriminate due to religious belief.

=== United States ===
In the United States, the First Amendment guarantees that Congress will make no law "prohibiting the free exercise" of religion, and this clause is used as justification for the legality of religious exemptions in the United States. The earliest court case litigating religious exemptions was the New York case People v. Phillips in 1813, ruling that a Catholic priest could not be compelled to testify on a confession in violation of his duty as a priest. In 1878, the Supreme Court of the United States ruled that the government could ban polygamy without a religious exemption in Reynolds v. United States. In 1943, the Supreme Court did grant a religious exemption to an ordinance against door-to-door solicitation in Murdock v. Pennsylvania. In Sherbert v. Verner (1963), the Court decision refused the request made by a claimant to receive unemployment compensation benefits due to denying work on Saturdays because of religious justifications. Based on this case, the Court further reasoned that a person could pursue an exemption from law unless the government could present the burden was justified by government interest, which this standard is high and not easy to meet. Later in 1972, the Supreme Court established the "Sherbert test" in Sherbert v. Verner, establishing a standard of strict scrutiny on religious exemptions. The Supreme Court moved away from religious exemptions in Employment Division v. Smith in 1990. The case Employment Division v. Smith is about two members of the Native American Church who were refused to be granted unemployment benefits consequent to them being fired for consuming peyote, which is part of their religious ceremony. The Court claimed that exemption from compliance with generally applicable laws could not be held through free exercise clause and that the government was not required to show compelling interest while applying this law. In 1993, the Religious Freedom Restoration Act of 1993 (RFRA) was legislated by the Congress as a direct response to the Smith case, which it disagreed with the decision by reevaluating it with the Sherbert test. The RFRA granted legal protections toward rights that are beyond the Constitution's free exercise clause; it created a more intensive and complex standard when reviewing government actions that pose a “substantial burden” on one’s exercise of their religious practices. To further clarify, the term “substantial burden” originated from the free exercise case law, and the burden contributes to the meaning of the conflict an individual faced when one is required to make a choice between one’s religious beliefs and the reception of a governmental benefit or legal penalties. Based on the shifts in Court decisions and the enactment of RFRA, standards of examining religious exemptions have changed and the trend has shown to put heavier emphasis and broaden the scope of the legitimization of religious exemption.

In the 1990s, the Congress also passed the American Indian Religious Freedom Act to write religious exemptions into law, having the same aim and intention as enacting the Religious Freedom Restoration Act (RFRA). The Religious Freedom Restoration Act authorized the government to enforce a law against religious practice only if it "furthers a compelling governmental interest" and it is the "least restrictive means" to pursue this interest. The American Indian Religious Freedom Act granted a religious exemption for the use of peyote for religious purposes by Native American tribes. Many states have since passed their own versions of the Religious Freedom Restoration Act to extend its coverage to state law.

In 2014, the Supreme Court ruled in favor of religious exemptions for private businesses in Burwell v. Hobby Lobby Stores, Inc. Legal scholars have considered a wide variety of implications that may result from this decision, many of which have yet to be tested in court.

A substantial area of religious exemptions in the United States are those that allow individuals to avoid vaccination mandates. For childhood vaccination mandates, most U.S. states provide some kind of religious exemption, with standards for receiving such an exemption varying from a minimal statement in some states to a more searching examination of the sincerity of the beliefs claimed in others.

As of 2025, 45 states and the District of Columbia grant exemptions for people who have religious objections to immunizations. The five states that do not recognize a religious objection are California (California Senate Bill 277), Connecticut, Maine (2020 Maine Question 1), New York, and West Virginia. Until 2015, only Mississippi and West Virginia did not permit religious exemptions. However, the 2014 Disneyland measles outbreak and 2019 measles outbreak prompted lawmakers to remove religious and philosophical exemptions in some states. In 2023, Mississippi re-instated religious exemptions for childhood vaccine mandates. In January 2025, West Virginia governor Patrick Morrisey issued an executive order allowing religious exemptions in the state, though the order has been ignored by the state's Board of Education and has not been enforced or codified into law.

During the COVID-19 period, getting vaccinated against the pandemic has become a required condition of employment for many employees. However, many asked for religious exemptions with the statements that vaccination acts against their religion and beliefs. One of the reasons for opposition is that they believe fetal cells developed from abortions have been utilized in the production process of COVID-19 vaccines. In terms of religious exemptions regarding COVID-19 vaccine mandates, Title VII of the Civil Rights Act of 1964 and the Americans with Disabilities Act (ADA) were commonly implemented, which both require employers, if no hardships would be caused, to provide accommodations to employee’s sincerely held religious beliefs.

Other than the legitimacy of religious exemptions toward receiving healthcare, religious exemptions are also acceptable for healthcare professionals to deny providing services that conflict with their religious beliefs. A few months following Roe v. Wade (1973), the first case that legalized abortion rights, the Congress passed a law (Church Amendments, 42 U.S.C. § 300a-7) stating that no institutions and individuals providing healthcare can be required to conduct abortions or sterilizations if the procedures violate its religious beliefs.

== Criticism and support ==
With the implementation of the most-favored-nation doctrine, which plays a role in influencing the Supreme Court’s decision on religious exemption cases, the paradox in approving and rejecting religious exemption has been magnified. The reason for this is because it gave little guidance to lower courts on the standard of evaluating the constitutionality of laws concerning religious exemption. This lack of clarity is problematic as it gives litigants the space or opportunity to utilize, or “weaponize,” religious exemption claims against unpopular laws and regulations. In Fulton v. City of Philadelphia, the adoption of the most-favored nation doctrine, which supports a broad theory of free exercise, causes lower courts to utilize religious exemptions as answer or justification to unresolved disputes. Also, some argued that religious exemptions would diminish the human rights and create negative externalities to other parties. For example, in Tandon v. Newsom, California Governor Newsom’s COVID-19 executive order has limited indoor gatherings to members of three households, which would conflict with the number of people in gatherings at houses of worship such as churches. Some would argue that if religious exemptions applied in this case, it would result in a greater risk of spreading the pandemic, affecting the community’s health and wellbeing. In short, people who are against the use of religious exemptions argues that it causes legal inequality and undermines the power of laws. On the other hand, the group of people who are in favor of the legitimization and the use of religious exemptions think it prevents the coercion of conscience and protects minority religions, which many religious exemption laws included antidiscrimination policies and clauses.

== See also ==
- Accommodationism
- Law and religion
- Religion in politics
- Reasonable accommodation
