= RLUIPA Equal Terms Provision circuit split =

President Bill Clinton signed the Religious Land Use and Institutionalized Persons Act of 2000 into law on September 22 of 2000. This piece of legislation was intended to protect the free exercise of religion as it relates to institutionalized persons and land use. One provision of RLUIPA pertaining to land use is the Equal Terms Provision. The Equal Terms Provision states "No government shall impose or implement a land use regulation in a manner that treats a religious assembly or institution on less than equal terms with a nonreligious assembly or institution." While RLUIPA has been the subject of much scholarly writing, the Equal Terms Provision has received little attention on its own.

However, the Equal Terms Provision has proven difficult for some courts to interpret and has caused a circuit split as to its application. At this point in time, there are three different approaches that Circuit Courts of Appeals have applied to the Equal Terms Provision.

== The Eleventh Circuit Approach ==
In a case dealing with the placement of synagogues the Eleventh Circuit was forced to analyze the Equal Terms Provision. The Court interpreted the Equal Terms provision to include a broad definition of "assembly or institution" to compare secular and religious uses. If a similar secular institution is found, the law in question is subject to strict scrutiny, which means it must be narrowly tailored to achieve a compelling government end.

== The Third and Seventh Circuit Approach ==
The Third and Seventh Circuit Courts have adopted applications of the Equal Terms Provision that are very similar to one another. Separating from the Eleventh Circuit's approach to assembly or institution, the Third Circuit found that similarly situated assemblies or institutions had to be measured by the effect they had on the purpose of the regulation imposed. If a similar institution is found to be treated on better terms than a religious institution then the law or ordinance will be subject to strict scrutiny and invalidated. The Seventh Circuit changed the Third Circuit's test only a little, by not using the purpose of the regulation imposed standard, but rather the regulatory criteria. It is believed that the Third Circuit approach was a little too easy to maneuver around and turn in the favor of the local municipality.

== The Ninth Circuit Approach ==
The Ninth Circuit has weighed in most recently on the Equal Terms Provision. The test used deals with the meaning of the word "equal" and stresses that it will mean different things in different situations. The Court goes on to state that a municipality can justify its treatment on different terms so long as it relates to a legitimate regulatory purpose and not the religious nature of the institution.
