= Sherbert v. Verner =

- Supreme Court of the United States

Argued April 24, 1963 Decided June 17, 1963
- Full case name: Sherbert v. Verner et al., Members of South Carolina Employment Security Commission, et al.
- Citations: 374 U.S. 398 (more) 83 S. Ct. 1790; 10 L. Ed. 2d 965; 1963 U.S. LEXIS 976
- Argument: Oral argument

Case history
- Prior: Employment Security Commission denied claim; affirmed by Court of Common Pleas for Spartanburg County; affirmed by South Carolina Supreme Court, 240 S. C. 286, 303-304, 125 S. E. 2d 737, 746; probably jurisdiction noted, 371 U.S. 938

Holding
- The Free Exercise Clause mandates strict scrutiny for unemployment compensation claims.

Court membership
- Chief Justice Earl Warren Associate Justices Hugo Black · William O. Douglas; Tom C. Clark · John M. Harlan II; William J. Brennan Jr. · Potter Stewart; Byron White · Arthur Goldberg

Case opinions
- Majority: Brennan, joined by Warren, Black, Douglas, Clark, Goldberg
- Concurrence: Douglas
- Concurrence: Stewart (in result)
- Dissent: Harlan, joined by White

Laws applied
- U.S. Const. amends. I, XIV

Sherbert v. Verner, 374 U.S. 398 (1963), was a case in which the Supreme Court of the United States held that the Free Exercise Clause of the First Amendment required the government to demonstrate both a compelling interest and that the law in question was narrowly tailored before it denied unemployment compensation to someone who was fired because her job requirements substantially conflicted with her religion.

The case established the Sherbert Test, requiring demonstration of such a compelling interest and narrow tailoring in all Free Exercise cases in which a religious person was substantially burdened by a law. The conditions are the key components of what is usually called strict scrutiny. This means that if someone's religious beliefs faced a serious burden due to a law and the government had no reasonable alternatives for that law, the government would have the burden to prove that the law was justified. The Sherbert test has received praise by legal scholars at the time and thereafter.

In 1990, the Supreme Court decided that the Sherbert Test, as a judicial constitutional analysis tool, was too broad when applied to all laws. With respect to religiously neutral, generally applicable laws that incidentally burden religious exercise, the Sherbert Test was eliminated in Employment Division v. Smith. For laws that discriminate along religious/secular lines or neutral laws that are enforced in a discriminatory way, the components of the Sherbert Test are still appropriate constitutional tools for courts to use.

In response to the 1990 Smith decision, Congress created an enhanced version of the Sherbert Test as a statutory, rather than constitutional, right in the federal Religious Freedom Restoration Act (RFRA) of 1993. Its provisions were designed to apply broadly to all laws and regulations, both federal and state. Although Congress replaced the "narrowly tailored" constitutional requirement with a "least restrictive means" statutory requirement, the enhanced test is still referred to as the Sherbert Test.

However, the Supreme Court held in City of Boerne v. Flores that the law was unconstitutional because its enhanced Sherbert Test, as a purported change in constitutional rights, could not be enforced against the states. It impermissibly interfered with the judiciary's sole power to interpret the Constitution. However, the ruling did not necessarily limit its effect on interpretation of federal statutes.

In 2000, Congress passed the Religious Land Use and Institutionalized Persons Act (RLUIPA) that applied only to federal laws. Both laws contain the same language for an even further enhanced Sherbert Test, one that broadens the definition of substantial religious burden.

The Supreme Court has since relied on the statutory Sherbert Test to decide several prominent cases, including Burwell v. Hobby Lobby, 573 U.S. 682 (2014), and Gonzales v. O Centro Espírita Beneficente União do Vegetal, 546 U.S. 418 (2006).

== Background of the case ==
Adell Sherbert, a member of the Seventh-day Adventist Church, worked as a textile-mill operator. Two years after her conversion to that faith, her employer switched from a five-day to a six-day workweek, including Saturdays. Since according to her belief, God in Exodus 20:8-11 forbade working on Saturdays (Saturday being the Sabbath for Seventh-day Adventists), she refused to work that day and was fired. Sherbert could not find any other work and applied for unemployment compensation. Her claim was denied, even though the state's ineligibility provisions exempted anyone, whether religious or not, who was unemployed "for good cause." The decision of the South Carolina Employment Security Commission, chaired by Charlie Verner, was affirmed by a state trial court and the South Carolina Supreme Court.

== Decision ==
The Supreme Court, in a 7–2 decision, reversed the Commission and the lower courts and found that as applied, the government's denial of Sherbert's claim was an unconstitutional burden on the free exercise of her religion. The majority opinion effectively created the "Sherbert" Test, determining whether government action runs afoul of the Free Exercise Clause.

=== Brennan's majority opinion ===
Brennan, writing for the majority, stated that denial of Sherbert's unemployment claim represented a substantial burden upon her. Even if that burden took the form of denial of a privilege to unemployment compensation, instead of violating compensation she was entitled to by right, it still effectively impeded her free exercise of her religion. As Brennan wrote, "to condition the availability of benefits upon this appellant's willingness to violate a cardinal principle of her religious faith effectively penalizes the free exercise of her constitutional liberties." Brennan dismissed the claim that his decision violated the Establishment Clause by establishing the Seventh-day Adventist religion. Finally, the majority opinion did not consider the Equal Protection argument, since it had already ruled in Sherbert's favor on First Amendment grounds.

=== Douglas and Stewart's concurring opinions ===
Douglas wrote separately to explain that the issue was not the degree of injury to Sherbert, but South Carolina's denial of unemployment on the basis of her beliefs. The issue was not individual action, but government action, and under what basis government could deny someone benefits.

Stewart concurred in the result, but not in the majority's reasoning. He did not dismiss the Establishment Clause issue as the majority did. Instead, he identified as a "double-barreled dilemma" between Free Exercise Clause protection of Sherbert's actions and — as it had been interpreted, wrongly in his view, by the court — Establishment Clause prohibition of such protection. He also disagreed with the majority's claim that a cited precedent, Braunfeld v. Brown, was distinguishable from Sherbert.

=== Harlan's dissenting opinion ===
Harlan, in a characteristically formalist reading of the relevant law, argued that the Commission denied Sherbert unemployment based on the same reason they might any secular claimant, that she was not "available for work" because of a private decision she had made. More centrally, he rejected the majority opinion, arguing that the Free Exercise Clause only required neutrality toward religion in this case, which would not include exempting Sherbert, though the Constitution would permit a legislature to create such an exemption.

== Sherbert test ==
In Sherbert, the Court set out a three-prong test for courts to use in determining whether the government has violated an individual's constitutionally protected right to the free exercise of religion.

1. The first prong investigates whether the government has burdened the individual's free exercise of religion. If government confronts an individual with a choice that pressures the individual to forego a religious practice by imposing a penalty or withholding a benefit, the government has burdened the individual's free exercise of religion.
2. However, not all burdens placed on religious exercise are constitutionally prohibited under the test. If the first prong is passed, the government may still constitutionally impose the burden on the individual's free exercise if the government can show
  - it possesses some compelling state interest that justifies the infringement (the compelling interest prong) and
  - no alternative form of regulation can avoid the infringement and still achieve the state's end (the narrow tailoring prong).

== Limiting Sherbert test ==
The Supreme Court sharply curtailed the Sherbert Test in the 1980s, culminating in the 1990 landmark case Employment Division v. Smith. In Smith, the court held that free exercise exemptions were not required from generally applicable laws. In response to the Smith decision, Congress passed the 1993 Religious Freedom Restoration Act (RFRA) to reinstate the Sherbert Test as a statutory right. The RFRA purported to restore strict scrutiny analysis to all free exercise cases in which the plaintiff proves a substantial burden on the free exercise of his or her religion. However, four years later, the court struck down RFRA as applied to Constitutional interpretation. In City of Boerne v. Flores, 521 U.S. 507 (1997), the court found that RFRA, as applied to the states, exceeded Congress's power under Section 5 of the Fourteenth Amendment. But the ruling did not necessarily limit RFRA's effect on interpretation of federal statutes. Using a parliamentary procedure known as unanimous consent, both the House and the Senate re-enacted RFRA's provisions in 2000, in conjunction with adding a similar statutory test to the Religious Land Use and Institutionalized Persons Act (RLUIPA).

Without addressing RFRA's constitutionality, the Supreme Court has held, in Gonzales v. UDV, 546 U.S. 418 (2006), that RFRA applies to other federal statutes. In UDV, the court applied the statutory Sherbert Test created by RFRA and found that the conduct in question—use of a Schedule I drug in a religious ritual—was protected under the First Amendment.

== See also ==
- Free Exercise Clause of the First Amendment
- Strict scrutiny
- Lemon Test
