= William Bentley Ball =

American lawyer (1916–1999)

William Bentley Ball, KSG (October 6, 1916 - January 10, 1999) was a prominent American constitutional lawyer, Roman Catholic layman, and former US Navy officer who gained national attention for winning the precedent-setting Wisconsin Supreme Court case Wisconsin v. Yoder in a 6-1 decision which held that requiring Amish parents to send their children to secondary school violated their constitutional right to religious free exercise. He was also the vice chairman of the National Committee for Amish Religious Freedom, the group for which he won the precedent-setting case. Ball argued 9 cases before the U.S. Supreme Court. In 1967, Ball worked on his first Supreme Court case, Loving v. Virginia, entering a brief on behalf of 25 Catholic bishops on the unconstitutionality of anti-miscegenation laws. The last case that he argued and won was Zobrest v. Catalina Foothills School District to force a school district through the Individuals with Disabilities Education Act to continue supplying a sign language translator for a student who transferred to a Catholic high school.

Born in Rochester, New York, son of Mary Catherine Foley (1885-1955) and folk baritone singer Bentley Ball, he graduated from Western Reserve University in 1940. Ball served with the 107th Cavalry Regiment of the Ohio Army National Guard and was a US Navy officer during World War II, serving aboard the USS Quincy and reaching the rank of lieutenant commander. He received his law degree from the University of Notre Dame in 1948. A native of Camp Hill, Pennsylvania, he died at age 82 while on vacation in Florida.
