= Gonzales v. O Centro Espírita Beneficente União do Vegetal =

- Supreme Court of the United States

Argued November 1, 2005 Decided February 21, 2006
- Full case name: Alberto R. Gonzales, Attorney General, et al., v. O Centro Espírita Beneficente União do Vegetal et al.
- Docket no.: 04-1084
- Citations: 546 U.S. 418 (more) 126 S. Ct. 1211; 163 L. Ed. 2d 1017; 2006 U.S. LEXIS 1815; 74 U.S.L.W. 4119
- Argument: Oral argument

Case history
- Prior: Preliminary injunction granted in part to plaintiffs, O Centro Espirita Beneficente União do Vegetal v. Ashcroft, 282 F. Supp. 2d 1236 (D.N.M. 2002); affirmed, 342 F.3d 1170 (10th Cir. 2003); affirmed en banc, 389 F.3d 973 (10th Cir. 2004); cert. granted, sub nom. Gonzales v. O Centro Espirita Beneficente União do Vegetal, 544 U.S. 973 (2005)

Holding
- A church was properly granted an injunction under the Religious Freedom Restoration Act of 1993 against criminal prosecution for its sacramental use of a hallucinatory substance, because the federal government had failed to demonstrate a compelling interest in prohibiting that use under the Controlled Substances Act. United States Court of Appeals for the Tenth Circuit affirmed and remanded.

Court membership
- Chief Justice John Roberts Associate Justices John P. Stevens · Antonin Scalia; Anthony Kennedy · David Souter; Clarence Thomas · Ruth Bader Ginsburg; Stephen Breyer · Samuel Alito

Case opinion
- Majority: Roberts, joined by Stevens, Scalia, Kennedy, Souter, Thomas, Ginsburg, Breyer
- Alito took no part in the consideration or decision of the case.

Laws applied
- U.S. Const. amend. I; 42 U.S.C. § 2000bb (Religious Freedom Restoration Act of 1993)

Gonzales v. O Centro Espírita Beneficente União do Vegetal, 546 U.S. 418 (2006), was a United States Supreme Court case in which the Court held that, under the Religious Freedom Restoration Act of 1993, the government had failed to show a compelling interest in prosecuting religious adherents for drinking a sacramental tea containing a Schedule I controlled substance. After the federal government seized its sacramental tea, the New Mexican branch of the União do Vegetal (UDV), a Brazilian church that imbibes hoasca in its services, sued, claiming the seizure was illegal, and sought to ensure future importation of the tea for religious use. The church won a preliminary injunction from the United States District Court for the District of New Mexico, which was affirmed on appeal.

The Supreme Court affirmed. The Court also disagreed with the government's central argument that the uniform application of the Controlled Substances Act (CSA) does not allow for exceptions for the substance in this case, as Native Americans are given exceptions to use peyote, another Schedule I substance.

== Background ==
On May 21, 1999, U. S. Customs agents seized over 30 U.S. gallons (110 liters) of hoasca (ayahuasca) tea which was shipped to the Santa Fe, New Mexico branch of the Brazil-based UDV; ayahuasca contains dimethyltryptamine, which is outlawed for most purposes under the Controlled Substances Act. While no charges were filed, the United States chapter, led by Seagram heir Jeffrey Bronfman, filed suit claiming that the seizure was an illegal violation of the church members' rights. They claimed their usage was permitted under the 1993 Religious Freedom Restoration Act (RFRA), 42 U.S.C. § 2000bb, a law passed by Congress in direct response to Employment Division v. Smith (1990), in which the Supreme Court held that unemployment benefits could be denied to two Native Americans fired for using Peyote.

In filing suit, the UDV sought a preliminary injunction preventing the federal government from barring their usage of hoasca. In August 2002, U.S. District Chief Judge James Aubrey Parker granted the church's motion, finding it was likely to succeed on the merits of its claim under RFRA.

In September 2003, United States Court of Appeals for the Tenth Circuit Senior Judge John Carbone Porfilio, joined by Judge Stephanie Kulp Seymour, affirmed, over the dissent of Judge Michael R. Murphy. In November 2004, a divided majority of the en banc 10th Circuit again affirmed in a per curiam decision, by a vote of 8-5. Judge Murphy, joined fully by Judges David M. Ebel, Paul Joseph Kelly Jr., and Terrence L. O'Brien, wrote separately to argue that the district court used the correct standard but should not have granted the preliminary injunction. Judge Seymour, joined by Judges Deanell Reece Tacha, Porfilio, Robert Harlan Henry, Mary Beck Briscoe, and Carlos F. Lucero, wrote separately to argue that the district court used the wrong standard but reached the correct result. Judge Michael W. McConnell, joined in full by Judge Timothy Tymkovich, argued that the district court used the correct standard to reach the correct result, and partially joined those parts of the other opinions that said so.

As it worked its way through the appellate courts, the Supreme Court lifted a stay in December 2004 thereby permitting the church to use hoasca for their Christmas services. One-hour of oral arguments were heard on November 1, 2005, where Nancy Hollander appeared for the UDV and Edwin Kneedler, the Deputy Solicitor General of the United States, appeared for the government.

== Opinion of the Court ==
On February 21, 2006, the Supreme Court unanimously delivered judgment in favor of the church, affirming and remanding to the lower court. Chief Justice John Roberts wrote the opinion for a unanimous Court of eight justices. Justice Samuel Alito took no part in the consideration or decision of the case because he was not on the Court when the case was argued. The Court found that the government was unable to detail the government's compelling interest in barring religious usage of Hoasca when applying strict scrutiny as required by the Religious Freedom Restoration Act (RFRA).

The Court first found that the standard under RFRA for a preliminary injunction is the same as at trial, just as it would be for a constitutional claim. Disagreeing with the District Court, the Supreme Court found that ayahuasca is covered under the 1971 United Nations Convention on Psychotropic Substances, which is implemented by the Controlled Substances Act (CSA). The Court rejected the District Court's reliance on the official commentary to the convention, reasoning that the United Nations had incorrectly interpreted the treaty when it found that tea made from plants is a naturally occurring material. However, because the government had failed to submit any evidence on the international consequences of granting an exemption to CSA enforcement by allowing the UDV to practice its religion, the Court ruled that it had failed to meet its burden on this point. The Supreme Court ruled that the government failed to demonstrate a compelling interest in applying the Controlled Substances Act to the UDV's sacramental use of the tea.

The ruling upheld a preliminary injunction allowing the church to use the tea pending a lower court trial on a permanent injunction, during which the government would have had the opportunity to present further evidence consistent with the Supreme Court's ruling.

== Subsequent developments ==
The ruling is not binding on states. The Act was amended in 2003 to only include the federal government and its entities, such as Puerto Rico and the District of Columbia. A number of states have passed their own version of the RFRA, but the Smith case remains the authority in these matters in many states.

The UDV next sought to build a temple in Arroyo Hondo, Santa Fe County, New Mexico, prompting opposition from neighbors. When the county refused to grant the church a building permit, the UDV sued under the Religious Land Use and Institutionalized Persons Act, and Assistant Attorney General Tom Perez of the United States Department of Justice Civil Rights Division filed a statement of interest in support of the church. In late 2012, a settlement was reached in which the county agreed to allow the church to be built.

== See also ==
- Church of the Holy Light of the Queen
