= Jesse James (folk song) =

Folk song about the outlaw Jesse James

"The Ballad of Jesse James", or simply "Jesse James", is an 1887 American folk song about the outlaw of the same name, first recorded by Bentley Ball in 1919 and subsequently by many others, including Bascom Lamar Lunsford, Vernon Dalhart, Woody Guthrie, Pete Seeger, The Kingston Trio, The Pogues, The Ramblin' Riversiders, The Country Gentlemen, Willy DeVille, Van Morrison, Harry McClintock, Grandpa Jones, Bob Seger, The Nitty Gritty Dirt Band, Carl Sandburg, Sons of the Pioneers, Johnny Cash, Jackson C. Frank, Liam Clancy, Mungo Jerry and Bruce Springsteen. Members of the Western Writers of America chose it as one of the Top 100 Western songs of all time.

== Description ==
The lyrics are largely biographical containing a number of details from Jesse James' life, portraying him as an American version of Robin Hood, though there is no evidence to indicate that he actually "stole from the rich and gave to the poor". The song is the starting point of the Jesse James panel of a mural on American folk songs by Thomas Hart Benton.

But that dirty little coward
That shot Mr. Howard
Has laid poor Jesse in his grave.

Robert Ford, who killed Jesse, was a James' gang member. Mr. Howard was the alias that James lived under in Saint Joseph, Missouri at the time of his killing.

The song was recorded in 1924 by Bascom Lamar Lunsford and subsequently by many artists, including Woody Guthrie, Pete Seeger, Eddy Arnold, Jackson C. Frank, The Country Gentlemen, The Pogues, The Kingston Trio, Van Morrison, Bob Seger, Willy DeVille, Mungo Jerry and Bruce Springsteen. It is the most famous song about James. Part of the song is heard at the end of the 1939 movie, Jesse James. The song was used in a 1958 episode of the TV western series Lawman, in which the marshal tries to get Robert Ford (played by Martin Landau) out of town safely. Ry Cooder's arrangement of the song plays over the end credits of Walter Hill's 1980 movie The Long Riders and a portion of the song is performed on-screen by Nick Cave, who plays a strolling balladeer in a bar patronized by Robert Ford in the 2007 movie The Assassination of Jesse James by the Coward Robert Ford. The song has also been reworked by Rockstar Games and named Otis Miller, basically Jesse's version from Red Dead Redemption 2 (2018) universe, which was sung by a drunk Arthur many times and can be heard sung by the Van der Linde gang.

Woody Guthrie also wrote the song "Jesus Christ" based on the same melody and lyrical structure. The song "Ballad of October 16" from the album Songs for John Doe by the Almanac Singers is based on the same melody and has lyrical similarities.

The folksinger Almeda Riddle, born Almeda James, was a first cousin twice removed of Frank and Jesse James. On a recording of the song she noted, "I'm sure you've read of Frank and Jesse James. Well, my father's grandfather and their father (Robert S. James) was brothers. I never was ashamed of the James boys was my cousins, but neither was I proud of it."

The composer of the song is unknown, but it is attributed in the lyrics of some versions to "Billy Gashade" or ""Billy LaShade", though no historical record exists for anyone under either name.

This song is popular in the bluegrass repertoire; it is usually played as an instrumental, most often in the key of B.

== Lyrics ==
Although the lyrics and structure of the song vary among versions, the following arrangement is typical:

Jesse James was a lad that killed many a man,
He robbed the Glendale train,
He stole from the rich and he gave to the poor,
He'd a hand and a heart and a brain.

Well it was Robert Ford, that dirty little coward,
I wonder how he feels,
For he ate of Jesse's bread and he slept in Jesse's bed,
And he laid poor Jesse in his grave.

(chorus)

Well Jesse had a wife to mourn for his life,
Three children, [now] they were brave,
Well that dirty little coward that shot Mr. [Mister] Howard,
He laid poor Jesse [Has laid Jesse James] in his grave.

Jesse was a man, a friend to the poor,
He'd never rob a mother or a child,
There never was a man with the law in his hand,
That could take Jesse James alive.

Jesse was a man, a friend to the poor,
He'd never see a man suffer pain,
And with his brother Frank he robbed the Chicago bank,
And stopped the Glendale train.

It was on a Saturday night and the moon was shining bright,
They robbed the Glendale train,
And people they did say o'er many miles away
It was those outlaws, they're Frank and Jesse James

(chorus)

Now the people held their breath when they heard of Jesse's death,
And wondered how he ever came to fall
Robert Ford, it was a fact, he shot Jesse in the back
While Jesse hung a picture on the wall

Now Jesse went to rest with his hand on his breast,
The devil will be upon his knee.
He was born one day in the County Clay,
And he came from a solitary race.

(chorus)

A somewhat different version, alternately titled "I Wonder Where My Poor Old Jesse's Gone", is as follows:

Jesse James was a man that was knowed through all the land
For Jesse he was bold and bad and brave
But that dirty little coward that shot down Mr. Howard
Has went [sic] and laid poor Jesse in his grave

Oh I wonder where my poor old Jesse's gone
Oh I wonder where my poor old Jesse's gone
I will meet him in that land where I've never been before
And I wonder where my poor old Jesse's gone

Jesse and his brother, Frank, they robbed the Gallatin bank
And carried the money from the town
It was in that very place that they had a little race
And they shot Captain Sheets to the ground

It was on a Wednesday night and the moon was shining bright
They robbed the Glendale train
And the agent on his knees, delivered up the keys
To the outlaws, Frank and Jesse James

It was on a Friday night and the moon was shining bright
Bob Ford had been hiding in a cave
He had ate of Jesse's bread, he had slept in Jesse's bed
But he went and laid poor Jesse in his grave

(chorus)

Jesse James was alone a-straightening up his home
Stood on a chair to dust a picture frame
When Bob Ford fired the ball that pulled Jesse from the wall
And he went and laid poor Jesse in his grave

Jesse James has gone to rest with his hands upon his breast
There's many a man that never knowed his face
He was born one day in the county of Clay
And he came from a solitary race
