= Religious Freedom Restoration Act =

1993 United States federal law

Religious Freedom Restoration Act of 1993
- Long title: An Act to protect the free exercise of religion.
- Acronyms (colloquial): RFRA
- Enacted by: the 103rd United States Congress
- Effective: November 16, 1993

Citations
- Public law: 103-141
- Statutes at Large: 107 Stat. 1488

Codification
- Titles amended: 42 U.S.C.: Public Health and Social Welfare
- U.S.C. sections created: 42 U.S.C. ch. 21B § 2000bb et seq.

Legislative history
- Introduced in the House as H.R. 1308 by Chuck Schumer (D–NY) on March 11, 1993; Committee consideration by House Judiciary, Senate Judiciary; Passed the House on May 11, 1993 (passed voice vote); Passed the Senate on October 27, 1993 (97–3, Roll call vote 331, via Senate.gov, in lieu of S. 578) with amendment; House agreed to Senate amendment on November 3, 1993 (without objection); Signed into law by President Bill Clinton on November 16, 1993

United States Supreme Court cases
- City of Boerne v. Flores 521 U.S. 507 (1997); Gonzales v. O Centro Espírita Beneficente União do Vegetal 546 U.S. 418 (2006); Burwell v. Hobby Lobby, 573 U.S. 682 (2014); Zubik v. Burwell, No. 14-1418, 578 U.S. ___ (2016); Little Sisters of the Poor Saints Peter and Paul Home v. Pennsylvania, No. 19-431, 591 U.S. ___ (2020); Tanzin v. Tanvir, No. 19-71, 592 U.S. ___ (2020)

The Religious Freedom Restoration Act of 1993, Pub. L. No. 103-141, 107 Stat. 1488 (November 16, 1993), codified at 42 U.S.C. § 2000bb through 42 U.S.C. § 2000bb-4 (also known as RFRA, pronounced "rifra"), is a 1993 United States federal law that "ensures that interests in religious freedom are protected." The bill was introduced by Congressman Chuck Schumer on March 11, 1993. A companion bill was introduced in the Senate by Ted Kennedy the same day. A unanimous U.S. House and a nearly unanimous U.S. Senate—three senators voted against passage—passed the bill, and President Bill Clinton signed it into law.

The law was passed in response to the United States Supreme Court's 1990 decision in Employment Division v. Smith, which held that "neutral laws of general applicability" that burden the free exercise of religion do not violate the First Amendment to the United States Constitution. RFRA requires that strict scrutiny be applied to any law that burdens religious freedom, providing that such a law may be justified only if it is the least restrictive means of pursuing a compelling government interest.

While RFRA initially applied to both state and federal laws, the Supreme Court found its application to state governments unconstitutional in City of Boerne v. Flores (1997), which held that the RFRA is not a proper exercise of Congress's enforcement power. But it continues to apply to the federal government—for instance, in Gonzales v. O Centro Espírita Beneficente União do Vegetal (2006) and Burwell v. Hobby Lobby Stores, Inc. (2014). In response to City of Boerne v. Flores and other related RFR issues, 21 individual states have passed State Religious Freedom Restoration Acts that apply to state governments and local municipalities.

== Provisions ==
This law reinstated the Sherbert Test, set forth by Sherbert v. Verner and Wisconsin v. Yoder, which mandates that strict scrutiny be used when determining whether the Free Exercise Clause of the First Amendment to the United States Constitution, guaranteeing religious freedom, has been violated. In the Religious Freedom Restoration Act, Congress wrote that a religiously neutral law can burden a religion just as much as one that was intended to interfere with religion; therefore, the Act says that the "Government shall not substantially burden a person's exercise of religion even if the burden results from a rule of general applicability."

The law provides an exception if two conditions are met. First, the burden must be necessary for the "furtherance of a compelling government interest." Under strict scrutiny, a government interest is compelling when it is more than routine and does more than simply improve government efficiency. A compelling interest relates directly to core constitutional issues. The second condition is that the rule must be the least restrictive way to further the government interest.

== Background and passage ==
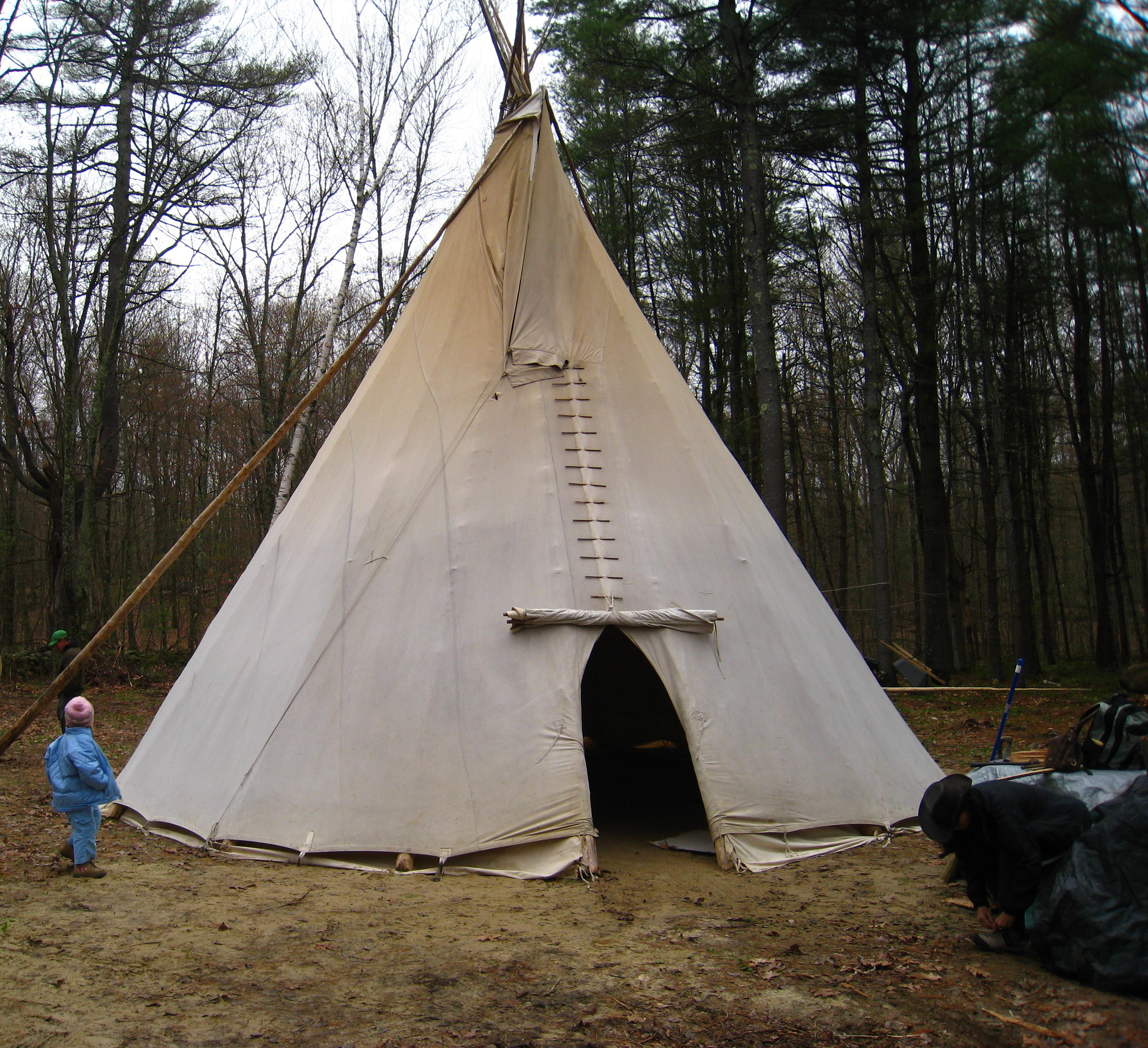
This tipi is used for peyote ceremonies in the Native American Church, the religion at the center of Employment Division v. Smith.

The Free Exercise Clause of the First Amendment states that Congress shall not pass laws prohibiting the free exercise of religion. In the 1960s, the Supreme Court interpreted this as banning laws that burdened a person's exercise of religion (e.g. Sherbert v. Verner, 374 U.S. 398 (1963); Wisconsin v. Yoder, 406 U.S. 205 (1972)). But in the 1980s the Court began to allow legislation that incidentally prohibited religiously mandatory activities as long as the ban was "generally applicable" to all citizens.

But "generally applicable" bans frequently conflicted with Native American religious practice. Often, government projects required acquisition of sacred grounds necessary for Native American rituals. Ritual peyote use infringed on the federal war on drugs. And the American Indian Religious Freedom Act, which Congress passed to protect tribal religious freedoms, lacked an enforcement mechanism.

These interests collided in Lyng v. Northwest Indian Cemetery Protective Association, 485 U.S. 439 (1988), and Employment Division v. Smith, 494 U.S. 872 (1990).

In Lyng, members of the Yurok, Tolowa and Karok tribes argued that the First Amendment should prevent the U.S. Forest Service from constructing a road through sacred land used in ceremonies and prayer. The Supreme Court disagreed, ruling that only government coercion or punishment for religious beliefs violates the First Amendment.

In Smith, the Court upheld the state of Oregon's refusal to grant unemployment benefits to two Native Americans fired from their jobs at a rehab clinic after testing positive for mescaline, the main psychoactive compound in the peyote cactus, which they had used in a religious ceremony.

The Smith decision outraged the public. Groups representing all points on the political spectrum (from the liberal American Civil Liberties Union to the conservative Traditional Values Coalition) and a wide variety of religions (i.e. the Christian Legal Society, the American Jewish Congress, the Baptist Joint Committee for Religious Liberty, and the National Association of Evangelicals) agreed that the law required reform, and recommended reinstating the Sherbert Test. In response, Congress passed the RFRA, unanimously in the House and 97-to-3 in the Senate. It was then signed by President Bill Clinton.

=== Applicability ===
The RFRA applies "to all Federal law, and the implementation of that law, whether statutory or otherwise", including any Federal statutory law adopted after the RFRA's date of signing "unless such law explicitly excludes such application."

According to a federal appeals court ruling on March 7, 2018, the RFRA did not justify discrimination against employees on the basis of their lesbian, gay, bisexual, or transgender identity in those circumstances. But on October 15, 2019, federal judge Reed O’Connor ruled that, because of the RFRA, federally funded healthcare insurers and providers must be allowed to deny medical treatment and coverage on the basis of the sex, gender identity, or termination of pregnancy of the person requesting the services, even if the services are medically necessary. Transgender people may be turned down even if the healthcare service they need is not related to their being transgender.

== Challenges and weaknesses ==
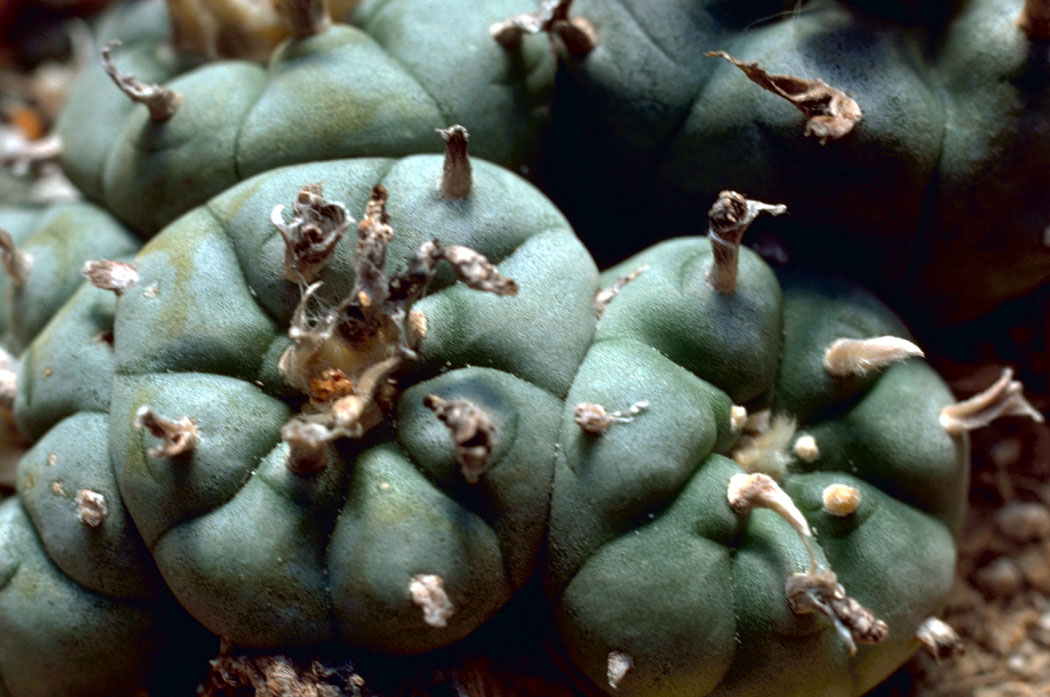
The peyote cactus, the source of the mescaline used by some Native Americans in religious ceremonies.

In 1997, the Supreme Court overturned part of the RFRA. The Roman Catholic Archdiocese of San Antonio wanted to enlarge a church in Boerne, Texas, but a Boerne ordinance protected the building as a historic landmark. The church sued, citing RFRA, and in the resulting case, City of Boerne v. Flores, 521 U.S. 507 (1997), the Supreme Court struck down the RFRA with respect to its applicability to states, holding that Congress had overstepped its Fourteenth Amendment power of enforcement. In 2000, in response to Boerne, Congress passed the Religious Land Use and Institutionalized Persons Act (RLUIPA), which grants special privileges to religious land owners.

Several states have passed state RFRAs, applying the rule to their laws, but Smith remains the authority in these matters in many others.

RFRA's constitutionality as applied to the federal government was confirmed on February 21, 2006, as the Supreme Court ruled against the government in Gonzales v. O Centro Espírita Beneficente União do Vegetal, 546 U.S. 418 (2006), which involved the use of an otherwise illegal substance in a religious ceremony, holding that the federal government must show a compelling state interest in restricting religious conduct.

Post-Smith, many members of the Native American Church still had issues using peyote in their ceremonies. This led to the Religious Freedom Act Amendments in 1994, which say, "the use, possession, or transportation of peyote by an Indian for bona fide traditional ceremony purposes in connection with the practice of a traditional Indian religion is lawful, and shall not be prohibited by the United States or any state. No Indian shall be penalized or discriminated against on the basis of such use, possession or transportation."

Tanzin v. Tanvir (2020) determined that RFRA allows for those whose religious rights are adversely affected by federal officers acting in their capacity for the government to seek appropriate remedies, including monetary damages, from those individuals. The case involved three Muslim men, all legal U.S. residents, who had been placed on the No Fly List by FBI agents for refusing to be informants for their Muslim communities.

== Applications and effects ==
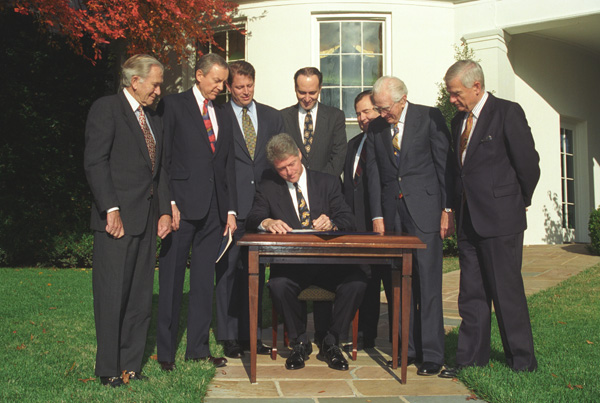
President Bill Clinton signing the Religious Freedom Restoration Act on the South Lawn at the White House. Participants at the signing include Vice President Al Gore, Senator Orrin Hatch, Senator Mark O. Hatfield, and Senator Howard Metzenbaum.

The RFRA holds the federal government responsible for accepting additional obligations to protect religious exercise. In O'Bryan v. Bureau of Prisons, it was found that the RFRA governs the actions of federal officers and agencies and that it can apply to "internal operations of the federal government." In conjunction with President Bill Clinton's executive order in 1996, RFRA provided more security for sacred sites for Native American religious rites.

As of 1996, the year before the RFRA was found unconstitutional as applied to states, 337 cases had cited RFRA. It was also found that Jewish, Muslim, and Native American religions, which make up only 3% of religious membership in the U.S., make up 18% of the cases involving the free exercise of religion. Tribes challenging the National Forest Service's plans to permit upgrades to Arizona's Snowbowl ski resort relied on the RFRA. Six tribes were involved, including the Navajo, Hopi, Havasupai, and Hualapai. They objected on religious grounds to the plans to use reclaimed water. They felt that this risked infecting the tribal members with "ghost sickness" as the water would be from mortuaries and hospitals. They also felt that the reclaimed water would contaminate the plant life used in ceremonies. In August 2008, the Ninth Circuit Court of Appeals rejected their RFRA claim.

In Adams v. Commissioner, the United States Tax Court rejected the argument of Priscilla M. Lippincott Adams, a devout Quaker. She argued that under RFRA, she was exempt from federal income taxes. The U.S. Tax Court rejected her argument and ruled that she was not exempt, saying, "while petitioner's religious beliefs are substantially burdened by payment of taxes that fund military expenditures, the Supreme Court has established that uniform, mandatory participation in the Federal income tax system, irrespective of religious belief, is a compelling governmental interest." In Miller v. Commissioner, taxpayers objected to the use of Social Security numbers, arguing that they relate to the Biblical "mark of the beast". In its decision, the U.S. Court discussed RFRA's relevance, but ruled against the taxpayers.

In Navajo Nation v. United States Forest Service, the Court of Appeals for the Ninth Circuit held that using recycled sewage water to manufacture artificial snow in the San Francisco Peaks was not a "substantial burden" on Native Americans' religious freedom.

The RFRA figured prominently in oral arguments in Burwell v. Hobby Lobby, heard by the Supreme Court on March 25, 2014. Justice Samuel Alito wrote in the majority opinion that nothing about RFRA's language or the way it was enacted implied that the statutory protections it conferred were confined to First Amendment case law as it existed pre-Smith. Four justices dissented.

== 20th anniversary ==
A day-long symposium was held at the Newseum in Washington, D.C., on November 7, 2013, to commemorate the 20th anniversary of the RFRA. "Restored or Endangered? The State of the Free Exercise of Religion in America" featured three panel discussions and two keynote addresses.

The first keynote address was by Oliver S. Thomas, the former general counsel of the Baptist Joint Committee for Religious Liberty and the chair of the diverse "Coalition for the Free Exercise of Religion" that worked in the 1990s for the RFRA's passage. The second was by Douglas Laycock, an author of RFRA. His address traced RFRA's legal history and discussed its impact on current debates, including the Affordable Care Act's contraception mandate and same-sex marriage laws.

The panel discussions covered RFRA's history and impact, religious freedom, the contraception mandate, and current and future challenges to free exercise of religion in a diverse society. The addresses and panel discussions are all online, as is a special downloadable resource with more on RFRA, published by the Baptist Joint Committee.

== See also ==
- Freedom of religion in the United States
- Reuben Snake
- State Religious Freedom Restoration Acts
- War on drugs
