= Navajo Nation v. United States Forest Service =

- Court: United States Court of Appeals for the Ninth Circuit
- Full case name: Navajo Nation, et al v. United States Forest Service, et al
- Argued: September 14, 2006
- Reargued: December 11, 2007
- Decided: March 12, 2007
- Citation: 479 F.3d 1024

Case history
- Prior history: 408 F. Supp. 2d 866 (D. Ariz. 2006)
- Subsequent history: Reversed en banc, August 8, 2008, 535 F.3d 1058

Court membership
- Judges sitting: Alex Kozinski, Harry Pregerson, Diarmuid F. O'Scannlain, Pamela Ann Rymer, Andrew J. Kleinfeld, Barry G. Silverman, William A. Fletcher, Raymond C. Fisher, Richard R. Clifton, Carlos Bea, Sandra S. Ikuta

Case opinions
- Majority: Bea, joined by Kozinski, O'Scannlain, Rymer, Kleinfeld, Silverman, Clifton, Ikuta
- Dissent: Fletcher, joined by Pregerson, Fisher

Laws applied
- Religious Freedom Restoration Act

Navajo Nation v. United States Forest Service, 479 F.3d 1024 (9th Cir. 2007), reversed after rehearing en banc, 535 F.3d 1058 (9th Cir. 2008) was brought to the United States Court of Appeals for the Ninth Circuit in 2007. It was a case that was brought about by previous cases dealing with the expansion of the Snowbowl ski resort on the government-owned sacred lands of the Navajo peoples located in northern Arizona. In Navajo Nation v. U.S. Forest Service, the conflict escalated with the Federal government's use of artificial snow containing treated sewage on the sacred San Francisco Peaks, an area that is owned by the Federal government. The Navajo people, along with twelve other nations, made the appeal, citing that the use of sewage water violated the Religious Freedom Restoration Act.

== Background ==
The proposal that the U.S. government approved consists of pumping 1.5 million gallons of sewage effluent per day from the nearby city of Flagstaff, Arizona, to the San Francisco Peaks in order to manufacture artificial snow for the Snowbowl. The purpose of the plan is to improve the economic viability of the ski resort, which has suffered diminished profits from decreased annual snowfall. The tribes of the Navajo Nation initiated a suit against the U.S. Forest Service under the Religious Freedom Restoration Act.

== Court decision ==
On March 12, 2007, a three-judge panel of the Ninth Circuit Court of Appeals had ruled favorably for the tribes. It held that the proposed use of treated sewage water would impose a "substantial burden" on the exercise of religion for the native nations. This ruling was reversed on August 8, 2008, when an en banc panel of the Ninth Circuit ruled that the use of recycled sewage water was not a "substantial burden" on the religious freedom of American Indians. "Substantial burden," the court argued, only occurred if an individual was forced to choose between following the tenets of his or her religious beliefs or receiving government benefit, or coerced to act contrary to his or her religious beliefs by the threat of civil or criminal sanctions. The Native peoples petitioned for certiorari in June 2009, but the Supreme Court denied the tribes' petition, upholding the Ninth Circuit Court's decision.
