= Bentley Ball =

American singer (1878–1957)

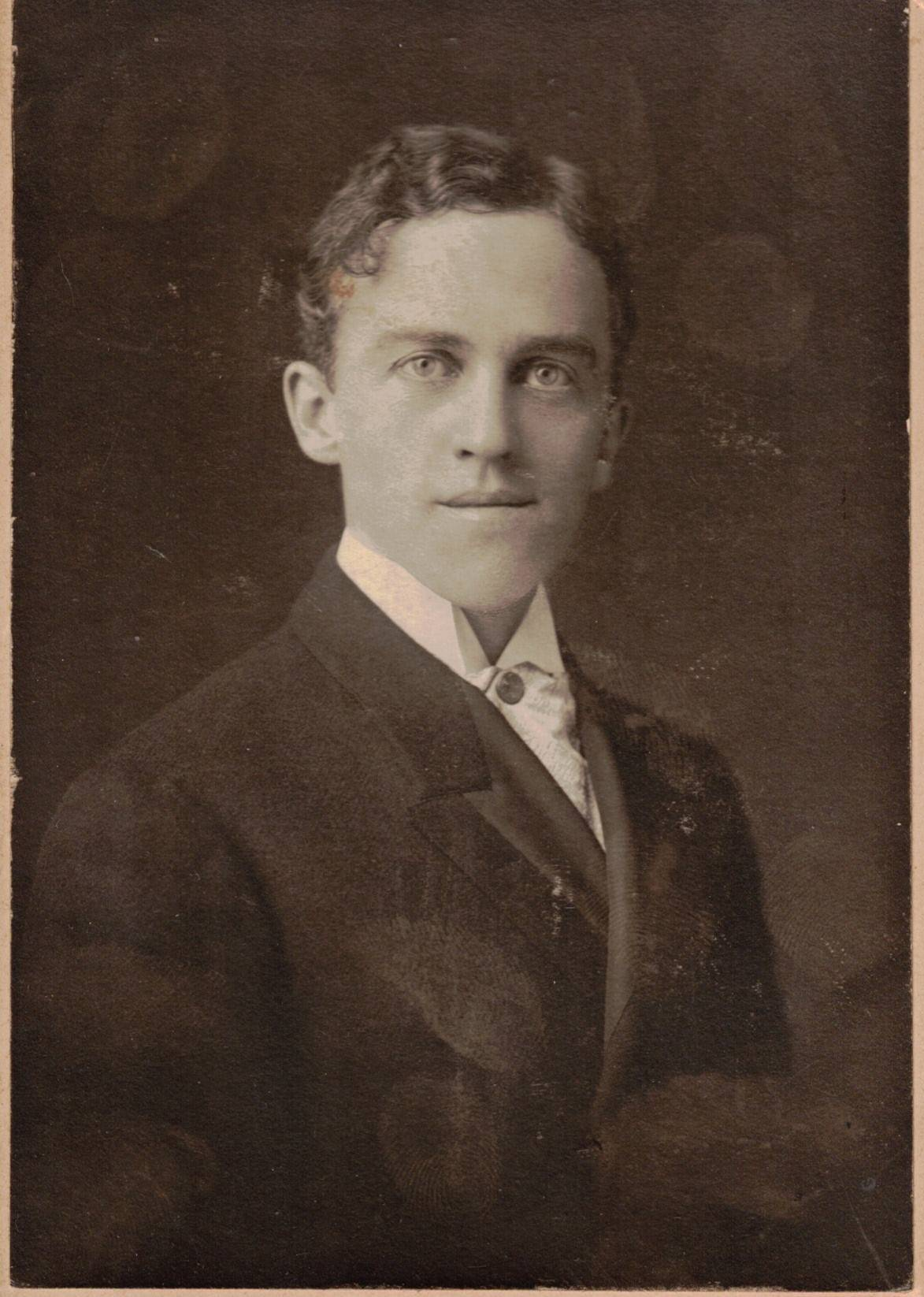
- Born: February 2, 1878; Newark, Ohio
- Died: July 15, 1957 (aged 79); Lower Merion Township, Pennsylvania
- Occupation: Singer

Walter Bentley Ball, commonly known as Bentley Ball (Newark, Ohio, 2 February 1878 – Lower Merion Township, Pennsylvania, 15 July 1957) was an American baritone singer most known for his pioneering work on folk music.

== Biography ==
His musical education started as a classical opera singer, with great vocal skills. In the twelfth census of the United States (1900), Bentley Ball is registered as a "vocal teacher". During the first part of his career, he was an active teacher and performer in the Chautauqua Movement, with the Walter Bentley Ball Concert Company. In the late 1910s Columbia Records entrusted him with the task of collecting and recording folk songs of the various American traditions: Native American, Black (spiritual and minstrel), Appalachian and Cowboy. His research resulted in five records (1919-1920) and the publication in 1922 of the book The Song-a-logue of America, analysing the various musical and cultural traditions he had studied.

His work had significant impact on 20th century American music. In fact several songs have been reinterpreted by many artists or have inspired other performers, such as the Led Zeppelin's Gallows Pole based on The Gallows Tree as first recorded by Bentley Ball. Another important first recording was Jesse James (folk song), later sung by Pete Seeger, The Pogues, Bruce Springsteen and many others.

He continued his musical career with lectures and performances in universities and schools around the country.

== Personal life ==
Born in a Protestant family, the son of Bentley Enoch Ball (1841–1888) and Mary M. Curtis, in 1911 Bentley Ball married Mary Catherine Foley (1885–1955), of Irish Catholic descent. They were the parents of journalist and writer Mary Louise Ball Martinez and prominent constitutional lawyer William Bentley Ball.

== Discography ==
List of Bentley Ball's records

- Hiawatha's Departure / My Bark Canoe // Tribal Prayer / Love Call – Columbia A3083 – 1919 – First recordings of Native American songs
- The Gallows Tree / Bangum An The Boar – Columbia A3084 – 1919 – First recordings of Appalachian songs
- The Dying Cowboy / Jesse James – Columbia A3085 – 1919 – First recordings of Cowboy songs
- Go Down Moses // O Graveyard / Peter, Go Ring Dem Bells – Columbia A3086 – 1919 – Black American spirituals
- Loch Lomond / Jwankydillo – Columbia A3074 – 1920
