= Wisconsin v. Yoder =

- Supreme Court of the United States

Argued December 8, 1971 Decided May 15, 1972
- Full case name: State of Wisconsin v. Jonas Yoder, Wallace Miller, and Adin Yutzy
- Citations: 406 U.S. 205 (more) 92 S. Ct. 1526; 32 L. Ed. 2d 15; 1972 U.S. LEXIS 144
- Argument: Oral argument

Case history
- Prior: Defendants convicted, Green County, Wisconsin Circuit Court; reversed, 182 N.W.2d 539 (Wis. 1971); cert. granted, 402 U.S. 994 (1971).
- Subsequent: None

Holding
- The Wisconsin Compulsory School Attendance Law violated the Free Exercise Clause of the First Amendment because required attendance past the eighth grade interfered with the right of Amish parents to direct the religious upbringing of their children. Supreme Court of Wisconsin affirmed.

Court membership
- Chief Justice Warren E. Burger Associate Justices William O. Douglas · William J. Brennan Jr. Potter Stewart · Byron White; Thurgood Marshall · Harry Blackmun; Lewis F. Powell Jr. · William Rehnquist

Case opinions
- Majority: Burger, joined by Brennan, Stewart, White, Marshall, Blackmun
- Concurrence: Stewart, joined by Brennan
- Concurrence: White, joined by Brennan, Stewart
- Dissent: Douglas (in part)
- Powell and Rehnquist took no part in the consideration or decision of the case.

Laws applied
- U.S. Const. amend. I; Wis. Stat. § 118.15 (Wisconsin Compulsory School Attendance Law)

Wisconsin v. Jonas Yoder, 406 U.S. 205 (1972), is a landmark decision of the Supreme Court of the United States, in which the Court held that Amish children could not be placed under compulsory education past 8th grade. The Court ruled that the Amish parents' fundamental right to free exercise of religion outweighed the state's interest in educating their children. The case is often cited as a basis for parents' right to educate their children outside of traditional private or public schools.

Like Sherbert v. Verner, the Court in Yoder required the government accommodate religious exercise by applying strict scrutiny to a neutral law that burdened religious exercise. Yoder differs from Sherbert v. Verner because the compulsory school attendance law was non-discriminatory and did not include a mechanism for individualized exemptions. Later, in Employment Division v. Smith Justice Antonin Scalia wrote that Yoder involved a "hybrid right" composed of parental rights and free exercise.

The Amish, who prevailed in the case, were represented by William Ball.

== Background of the case ==
Three Amish students from three different families stopped attending the New Glarus High School in the New Glarus, Wisconsin, school district at the end of the eighth grade because of their parents' religious beliefs. The three families were represented by Jonas Yoder (one of the fathers involved in the case) when the case went to trial. They were convicted in the Green County Court. Each defendant was fined the nominal sum of $5. Thereafter the Wisconsin Supreme Court found in Yoder's favor. Thereupon, Wisconsin appealed that ruling in the US Supreme Court.

The Amish did not believe in going to court to settle disputes but instead follow the biblical command to "turn the other cheek." Thus, the Amish are at a disadvantage when it comes to defending themselves in courts or before legislative committees. However, a Lutheran minister, Reverend William C. Lindholm, took an interest in Amish legal difficulties from a religious freedom perspective and founded The National Committee for Amish Religious Freedom (partly as a result of this case) and then provided them with legal counsel.

Under Amish church standards, "higher" education (beyond the 8th grade) was deemed not only unnecessary for their simple way of life, but also endangering to their salvation. These men appealed for exemption from compulsory education on the basis of these religious convictions. They sincerely held to the belief that the values their children would learn at home would surpass the worldly knowledge taught in school.

== Court's decision ==
The U.S. Supreme Court ruled in favor of Yoder in its decision. Justice William O. Douglas filed a partial dissent, but voted with the court regarding Yoder's case. Justices Lewis F. Powell Jr. and William H. Rehnquist took no part in the consideration or decision of the case.

The Wisconsin Supreme Court "sustained respondents' claim that application of the compulsory school-attendance law to them violated their rights under the Free Exercise Clause of the First Amendment, made applicable to the States by the Fourteenth Amendment."

The U.S. Supreme Court held as follows:

1. States cannot force individuals to attend school when it infringes on their First Amendment rights. In this case, the state of Wisconsin interfered with the practice of a legitimate religious belief.
2. Not all beliefs rise to the demands of the religious clause of the First Amendment. There needs to be evidence of true and objective religious practices, instead of an individual making his or her standards on such matters. The Amish way of life is one of deep religious convictions that stems from the Bible. It is determined by their religion, which involves their rejection of worldly goods and their living in the Biblical simplicity. The modern compulsory secondary education is in sharp conflict with their way of life.
3. With respect to the State of Wisconsin's argument that additional modern education beyond 8th grade is necessary to prepare citizens to participate effectively and productively in America's political system, the Court disagreed. It argued that the State provided no evidence showing any great benefit to having two extra years in the public schools. Furthermore, the Court contended that the Amish community was a very successful social unit in American society, a self-sufficient, law-abiding member of society, which paid all of the required taxes and rejected any type of public welfare. The Amish children, upon leaving the public school system, continued their education in the form of vocational training.
4. The Court found no evidence that by leaving the Amish community without two additional years of schooling, young Amish children would become burdens on society. To the contrary, the Court argued that they had good vocational background to rely upon. It was the State's mistaken assumption that Amish children were ignorant. Compulsory education after elementary school was a recent movement that developed in the early 20th century to prevent child labor and keep children of certain ages in school. The State of Wisconsin's arguments about compelling the school attendance were therefore less substantial.
5. Responding to Justice Douglas's dissent, the Court argued that the question before it was about the interests of the parents to exercise free religion, and did not relate to the child's First Amendment's rights. As such, the argument pertaining to the child's right to exercise free religion was irrelevant in this case.

Justice Potter Stewart, joined by Justice William J. Brennan Jr., filed a concurring opinion stating that the "interesting and important" questions raised by Justice Douglas's dissent were moot since the Amish children shared their parents' religious objections to the school attendance.

Justice Byron White, joined by Justices Brennan and Stewart, filed a concurring opinion saying the case "would be a very different case" if the parents forbade their children from "attending any school at any time and from complying in any way with the educational standards set by the State"; he pointed out that the burden on the children was relatively slight since they had acquired "the basic tools of literacy to survive in modern society" and had attended eight grades of school.

== Dissenting opinion ==
Justice William O. Douglas, who dissented in part, wrote:

I agree with the Court that the religious scruples of the Amish are opposed to the education of their children beyond the grade schools, yet I disagree with the Court's conclusion that the matter is within the dispensation of parents alone. The Court's analysis assumes that the only interests at stake in the case are those of the Amish parents on the one hand, and those of the State on the other. The difficulty with this approach is that, despite the Court's claim, the parents are seeking to vindicate not only their own free exercise claims, but also those of their high-school-age children ...

On this important and vital matter of education, I think the children should be entitled to be heard. While the parents, absent dissent, normally speak for the entire family, the education of the child is a matter on which the child will often have decided views. He may want to be a pianist or an astronaut or an oceanographer. To do so he will have to break from the Amish tradition.

It is the future of the student, not the future of the parents, that is imperiled by today's decision. If a parent keeps his child out of school beyond the grade school, then the child will be forever barred from entry into the new and amazing world of diversity that we have today. The child may decide that that is the preferred course, or he may rebel. It is the student's judgment, not his parents', that is essential if we are to give full meaning to what we have said about the Bill of Rights and of the right of students to be masters of their own destiny. If he is harnessed to the Amish way of life by those in authority over him and if his education is truncated, his entire life may be stunted and deformed. The child, therefore, should be given an opportunity to be heard before the State gives the exemption which we honor today.

== Legacy of the Court's decision ==
The ruling is cited as a basis for allowing people to be educated outside traditional private or public schools, such as with homeschooling.

The implications of the case for the Amish were characterized by one author as:

Since Wisconsin v. Yoder, all states must grant the Old Order Amish the right to establish their own schools (should they choose) or to withdraw from public institutions after completing eighth grade. In some communities Amish parents have continued to send their children to public elementary schools even after Wisconsin v. Yoder. In most places tensions eased considerably after the Supreme Court ruling, although certain difficulties remained for those Amish living in Nebraska.

== See also ==
- List of United States Supreme Court cases, volume 406
