= Narrow tailoring =

Legal principle

Narrow tailoring (also known as narrow framing) is the legal principle that a law be written specifically to fulfill only its intended goals. It is usually associated with the judicial test of strict scrutiny.

This phrase is most commonly invoked in constitutional law cases in the United States, such as First Amendment cases, or Equal Protection cases involving racial discrimination by creating racial distinctions. In the case Grutter v. Bollinger (2003), the United States Supreme Court held that:

Even in the limited circumstance when drawing racial distinctions is permissible to further a compelling state interest, government is still constrained under equal protection clause in how it may pursue that end: the means chosen to accomplish the government's asserted purpose must be specifically and narrowly framed to accomplish that purpose.

Prior to Students for Fair Admissions v. Harvard, affirmative action programs in higher education were only considered legal because they further the compelling state interest of creating diversity on university campuses. Federal courts would consider certain programs to be illegal if they exceeded the scope that would be required to fulfill the academic institution's goals.

== Brief history ==
The Supreme Court case Korematsu v. U.S. in 1944 is widely known to have brought the first concerns revolving strict scrutiny and racial discrimination. However, it was not until Chicago v. Mosley in 1972 to have first coined the term "narrowly tailoring" when the restriction of rights outlined in the U.S. Constitution serves a compelling state interest.

== See also ==
- Strict scrutiny
- Adarand Constructors, Inc. v. Peña
