= Free Exercise Clause =

Prohibits the U.S. Congress from prohibiting freedom of religion

The Free Exercise Clause accompanies the Establishment Clause of the First Amendment to the United States Constitution. The Establishment Clause and the Free Exercise Clause together read:

Congress shall make no law respecting an establishment of religion, or prohibiting the free exercise thereof...

Free exercise is the liberty of persons to reach, hold, practice and change beliefs freely according to the dictates of conscience. The Free Exercise Clause prohibits government interference with religious belief and, within limits, religious practice. To accept any creed or the practice of any form of worship cannot be compelled by laws, because, as stated by the Supreme Court in Braunfeld v. Brown, the freedom to hold religious beliefs and opinions is absolute. Federal or state legislation cannot therefore make it a crime to hold any religious belief or opinion due to the Free Exercise Clause. Legislation by the United States or any constituent state of the United States which forces anyone to embrace any religious belief or to say or believe anything in conflict with his religious tenets is also barred by the Free Exercise Clause.

In 1878, the Supreme Court was first called to interpret the extent of the Free Exercise Clause in Reynolds v. United States, as related to the prosecution of polygamy under federal law. The Supreme Court upheld Reynolds' conviction for bigamy, deciding that to do otherwise would provide constitutional protection for a gamut of religious beliefs, including those as extreme as human sacrifice. The Court said: "Congress cannot pass a law for the government of the Territory which shall prohibit the free exercise of religion. The First Amendment to the Constitution expressly forbids such legislation." Of federal territorial laws, the Court said: "Laws are made for the government of actions, and while they cannot interfere with mere religious beliefs and opinions, they may with practices."

Jehovah's Witnesses were often the target of such restriction. Several cases involving the Witnesses gave the Court the opportunity to rule on the application of the Free Exercise Clause. Subsequently, the Warren Court adopted an expansive view of the clause, the "compelling interest" doctrine (whereby a state must show a compelling interest in restricting religion-related activities), but later decisions have reduced the scope of this interpretation.

== Overview ==
The history of the Supreme Court's interpretation of the Free Exercise Clause follows a broad arc, beginning with approximately 100 years of little attention, then taking on a relatively narrow view of the governmental restrictions required under the clause, growing into a much broader view in the 1960s, and later again receding.

The first case to closely examine of the Free Exercise Clause was Reynolds v. United States in 1878. A case dealing with the prosecution of a polygamist under federal law, and the defendant's claim of protection under the Free Exercise Clause, the Court sustained the law and the government's prosecution. The Court read the Free Exercise Clause as protecting religious practices, but that did not protect Reynolds' practices which were crimes. The court went on to echo Reynolds in the 1890 case Davis v. Beason: "However free the exercise of religion may be, it must be subordinate to the criminal laws of the country, passed with reference to actions regarded by general consent as properly the subjects of punitive legislation." The Reynolds case, which also revived Thomas Jefferson's statement regarding the "wall of separation" between church and state, introduced the position that although religious exercise is generally protected under the First Amendment, this does not prevent the government from passing neutral laws that incidentally impact certain religious practices.

This interpretation of the Free Exercise Clause continued into the 1960s and the ascendancy of the Warren Court under chief justice Earl Warren. Applying a new standard of "strict scrutiny" in various areas of civil rights law, the Court began to apply this standard to the First Amendment religion clauses as well, reading the Free Exercise Clause to require accommodation of religious conduct except where a state could show a compelling interest and no less burdensome means to achieve that end. One example was Sherbert v. Verner, where the Court overturned the state Employment Security Commission's decision to deny unemployment benefits to a practicing member of the Seventh-day Adventist Church who was forced out of a job after her employer adopted a 6-day work week, which would have required her to work on Saturdays against the dictates of her religion. As Justice William Brennan stated for the majority, "to condition the availability of benefits upon this appellant's willingness to violate a cardinal principle of her religious faith effectively penalizes the free exercise of her constitutional liberties." This test was used through the years of the Burger Court, including particularly in the landmark case of Wisconsin v. Yoder (1972).

This view of the Free Exercise Clause would begin to narrow again in the 1980s, culminating in the 1990 case of Employment Division v. Smith. Examining a state prohibition on the use of peyote, the Supreme Court upheld the law despite the drug's use as part of a religious ritual, and without employing the strict scrutiny test. Instead, the Court again held that a "neutral law of general applicability" generally does not implicate the Free Exercise Clause. But the Court also stated that governmental discrimination in the field of religious belief and opinions is barred by the Free Exercise Clause, for the clause entails as core right the right to believe in and express any religious teaching in accordance with the personal desires. Any regulation by the government in the realm of religious belief and opinions is expressly forbidden by the First Amendment. Relying on its own First Amendment case law the Supreme Court concluded in Employment Division v. Smith: "The government may not compel affirmation of religious belief, see Torcaso v. Watkins, 367 U. S. 488 (1961), punish the expression of religious doctrines it believes to be false, United States v. Ballard, 322 U. S. 78, 322 U. S. 86-88 (1944), impose special disabilities on the basis of religious views or religious status, see McDaniel v. Paty, 435 U. S. 618 (1978); Fowler v. Rhode Island, 345 U. S. 67, 345 U. S. 69 (1953); cf. Larson v. Valente, 456 U. S. 228, 456 U. S. 245 (1982), or lend its power to one or the other side in controversies over religious authority or dogma, see Presbyterian Church v. Hull Church, 393 U. S. 440, 393 U. S. 445-452 (1969); Kedroff v. St. Nicholas Cathedral, 344 U. S. 94, 344 U. S. 95-119 (1952); Serbian Eastern Orthodox Diocese v. Milivojevich, 426 U. S. 696, 426 U. S. 708-725 (1976)." The Court's abandonment of the strict scrutiny test was followed by intense disapproval from Congress and the passage of the Religious Freedom Restoration Act in 1993 to attempt to restore the prior test. However, in City of Boerne v. Flores, the Supreme Court struck down the act as applied to the States, holding that it unconstitutionally attempted to usurp the Supreme Court's role in interpreting the Constitution, thus leaving the Smith test in place. In Church of Lukumi Babalu Aye v. City of Hialeah (1993), the Supreme Court stated that inquiries about whether laws discriminate based on religion don't end with the text of the laws at issue. Facial neutrality of laws (i.e. laws which are neutral in their language but may be discriminatory in enforcement or effect) is not determinative in these inquiries, because both the Free Exercise Clause and the Establishment Clause extend beyond facial discrimination. The Supreme Court explained that "[o]fficial action that targets religious conduct for distinctive treatment cannot be shielded by mere compliance with the requirement of facial neutrality", and "[t]he Free Exercise Clause protects against governmental hostility which is masked as well as overt."

== Jehovah's Witnesses cases ==
During the twentieth century, many major cases involving the Free Exercise Clause were related to Jehovah's Witnesses. Many communities directed laws against the Witnesses and their preaching work. From 1938 to 1955, the organization was involved in over forty cases before the Supreme Court, winning a majority of them. The first important victory came in 1938, when in Lovell v. City of Griffin, the Supreme Court held that cities could not require permits for the distribution of pamphlets. In 1939, the Supreme Court decided Schneider v. Town of Irvington, in which it struck down anti-littering laws that were enforced only against Jehovah's Witnesses who were handing out pamphlets. In 1940, the Court considered Cantwell v. Connecticut; the plaintiff, a Jehovah's Witness, was charged with soliciting donations without a certificate from the Public Welfare Council. The Council was to grant the certificate only if the organization requesting it was a charity or sponsored a religious cause. The Supreme Court ruled that any law granting a public body the function of determining if a cause is religious or not violates the First Amendment.

In 1940, the Supreme Court decided in Minersville School District v. Gobitis that members of the Jehovah's Witnesses in a school could be required to salute the flag. The ruling in Gobitis, however, did not stand for long. In 1943, West Virginia State Board of Education v. Barnette, the Supreme Court essentially reversed its previous opinion. Justice Frankfurter had, in the Gobitis case, suggested that the Witnesses attempt to reverse the School Board's policy by exercising their vote. In the Barnette case, however, Justice Robert H. Jackson wrote, "the very purpose of the Bill of Rights was to withdraw certain subjects from the vicissitudes of political controversy, to place them beyond the reach of majorities ... One's right to life, liberty, and property, to free speech, a free press, freedom of worship and assembly, and other fundamental rights may not be submitted to vote." The Supreme Court did not rule that the Pledge was unconstitutional; rather, they held that students may not be compelled to recite it.

In 1981, the Supreme Court held in Thomas v. Review Board of the Indiana Employment Security Division that Indiana's denial of unemployment benefits to Thomas, a Jehovah's Witness, violated the Free Exercise Clause. The Court said that the Indiana Supreme Court had incorrectly characterized Thomas's decision to quit his job due to his religious beliefs as merely a "philosophical" choice.

== Compelling interest ==
The Supreme Court under Earl Warren adopted an expansive view of the Free Exercise Clause. In Sherbert v. Verner (1963) the Court held that states must have a "compelling interest" to refuse to accommodate religiously motivated conduct. The case involved Adele Sherbert, who was denied unemployment benefits by South Carolina because she refused to work on Saturdays, something forbidden by her Seventh-day Adventist faith. In Wisconsin v. Yoder (1972), the Court ruled that a law that "unduly burdens the practice of religion" without a compelling interest, even though it might be "neutral on its face," would be unconstitutional.

In O'Lone v. Estate of Shabazz (1987), the Court held that the prison regulations were not a violation of the Free Exercise Clause of to deprive an inmate of attending a religious service for "legitimate penological interests."

The "compelling interest" doctrine became much narrower in 1990, when the Supreme Court held in Employment Division v. Smith that, as long as a law does not target a particular religious practice, it does not violate the Free Exercise Clause. Smith set the precedent "that laws affecting certain religious practices do not violate the right to free exercise of religion as long as the laws are neutral, generally applicable, and not motivated by animus to religion." In 1993, the Supreme Court revisited the Free Exercise Clause in Church of Lukumi Babalu Aye v. City of Hialeah. Hialeah had passed an ordinance banning ritual slaughter, a practice central to the Santería religion, while providing exceptions for some practices such as the kosher slaughter of Judaism. Since the ordinance was not "generally applicable," the Court ruled that it was subject to the compelling interest test, which it failed to meet, and was therefore declared unconstitutional. In 2017, the Court applied this doctrine in Trinity Lutheran v. Comer, holding that there must be a compelling state interest for express discrimination based on religious status in government funding schemes. Also in 1993, Congress passed the Religious Freedom Restoration Act (RFRA), which sought to restore the general applicability of the "compelling interest" standard present prior to Employment Division v. Smith. However, in City of Boerne v. Flores (1997) the Court struck down as exceeding Congress's powers those provisions of the Act that forced state and local governments to provide protections exceeding those required by the First Amendment. Thus, state and local government actions that are facially neutral toward religion are judged by the Employment Division v. Smith standard rather than RFRA. According to the court's ruling in Gonzales v. UDV (2006), RFRA remains applicable to federal statutes, which must therefore still meet the "compelling interest" standard in free exercise cases.

== See also ==
- First Amendment to the United States Constitution
- Establishment Clause
- Section 116 of the Constitution of Australia
- Separation of Church and State
- Freedom of thought
- Freedom of religion
- Freedom of religion in the United States
- United States religious history

== Research resources ==
- First Amendment Library entry on Free Exercise Clause (with links to all of the Supreme Court's Free Exercise opinions)
- Hamilton, Marci A. (2005). God vs. the Gavel: Religion and the Rule of Law. Cambridge: Cambridge University Press. ISBN 0-521-85304-4.
