= Tanzin v. Tanvir =

- Supreme Court of the United States

Argued October 6, 2020 Decided December 10, 2020
- Full case name: FNU Tanzin, et al. v. Muhammad Tanvir, et al.
- Docket no.: 19-71
- Citations: 592 U.S. 43 (more)
- Argument: Oral argument

Case history
- Prior: Judgment against plaintiff sub nom Tanvir v. Lynch 128 F.Supp. 3d 756 (S.D.N.Y. 2015); reversed and remanded, 894 F.3d 449 (2d Cir. 2018); rehearing en banc denied, 915 F.3d 898 (2d Cir. 2019)

Holding
- The express remedies provision under the Religious Freedom Restoration Act of 1993 permits litigants to obtain monetary damages against federal officials in their individual capacity whenever it is appropriate for such litigants to do so.

Court membership
- Chief Justice John Roberts Associate Justices Clarence Thomas · Stephen Breyer; Samuel Alito · Sonia Sotomayor; Elena Kagan · Neil Gorsuch; Brett Kavanaugh · Amy Coney Barrett

Case opinion
- Majority: Thomas, joined by Roberts, Breyer, Alito, Sotomayor, Kagan, Gorsuch, Kavanaugh
- Barrett took no part in the consideration or decision of the case.

Laws applied
- Religious Freedom Restoration Act

Tanzin v. Tanvir, 592 U.S. 43 (2020), was a United States Supreme Court case involving legal remedies that could be sought by litigants against federal officials for violations of the Religious Freedom Restoration Act of 1993. In a unanimous decision issued December 10, 2020, the court ruled that the Act allowed for litigants to seek not only injunctive relief but also monetary damages.

Notably, the Respondents in this case were Muslims who sued because federal agents put them on the No Fly List for refusing to be informants against their religious community. Legal scholars praised this case for protecting religious liberty.

== Background ==
At the center of the case were three men of the Muslim community with either U.S. citizenship or lawful permanent residency. In the wake of the September 11 attacks, the men were approached by Federal Bureau of Investigation (FBI) agents for questioning but not for any involvement of terrorist activity. Instead, the FBI wanted the men to serve "as government spies in their religious communities." The men refused, and the FBI pushed the matter by threatening to add their names to the Transportation Security Administration's No Fly List. The men continued to refuse to participate, and the FBI followed through with the threat around 2013.

The men tried repeatedly to have their names removed through the TSA but were directed to the FBI, which continued to state that if they co-operated by becoming informants in their Muslim communities, they would have their names removed. The men lost money on plane tickets that they could not use and also could not travel to see their families overseas or for other work-related functions.

== Lower courts ==
The three men sued the FBI in the United States District Court for the Southern District of New York. Upon the commencement of legal action, the FBI took steps to remove their names from the No Fly List and stated that the case should be considered moot. The plaintiffs continued the case, seeking monetary compensation, and asserted that it was allowed for by the Religious Freedom Restoration Act (RFRA), which allows for one to "obtain appropriate relief against a government" when one's religious rights are harmed by a federal officer of the government.

The District Court ruled to dismiss the case by asserting that the "appropriate relief" clause of the RFRA does not allow for monetary recovery from such damages and that with the removal from the No Fly List, there were no further remedies that the men could pursue.

The men appealed to the Second Circuit Appeals Court, which reversed the District Court's decision in May 2018, and allowed their case to go forward. The Second Circuit found the District Court erred in the reading of the RFRA since the suit was directed at the specific agents of the FBI whose actions had adversely affected the men's religious freedom, and monetary compensation was considered part of the appropriate relief that could be awarded. The Second Circuit declined to rehear the case en banc, with multiple judges dissenting.

== Supreme Court ==
The FBI agents, supported by the federal government, petitioned their case to the Supreme Court, which granted certiorari in November 2019. The government in its petition claimed that the Second Circuit's decision would clear "the way for a slew of future suits against national security officials, criminal investigators, correctional officers and countless other federal employees, seeking to hold them personally liable for alleged burdens on any of the myriad religious practices engaged in by the people of our nation."

Oral arguments for the case were held on October 6, 2020 via teleconference because of the ongoing COVID-19 pandemic. Justice Amy Coney Barrett had not yet been confirmed by the Senate to replace Ruth Bader Ginsburg and so took no part in the case.

The Court issued its decision on December 10, 2020. The unanimous decision was written by Justice Clarence Thomas and upheld the Second Circuit's decision that under the RFRA, monetary damages may be sought against federal agents.

Thomas stated, "For certain injuries, such as respondents' wasted plane tickets, effective relief consists of damages, not an injunction." He rejected the arguments from the government that they needed to protect the agents from such lawsuits: "To be sure, there may be policy reasons why Congress may wish to shield Government employees from personal liability, and Congress is free to do so. But there are no constitutional reasons why we must do so in its stead." He also said that the officers in question might escape liability under the principle of qualified immunity.

== Later proceedings ==
On remand the District Court and Second Circuit agreed that the agents were entitled to qualified immunity.
