= City of Boerne v. Flores =

- Supreme Court of the United States

Argued February 19, 1997 Decided June 25, 1997
- Full case name: City of Boerne, Petitioner v. P. F. Flores, Archbishop of San Antonio, and United States
- Citations: 521 U.S. 507 (more) 117 S. Ct. 2157; 138 L. Ed. 2d 624; 1997 U.S. LEXIS 4035; 65 U.S.L.W. 4612; 74 Fair Empl. Prac. Cas. (BNA) 62; 70 Empl. Prac. Dec. (CCH) ¶ 44,785; 97 Cal. Daily Op. Service 4904; 97 Daily Journal DAR 7973; 1997 Colo. J. C.A.R. 1329; 11 Fla. L. Weekly Fed. S 140

Case history
- Prior: 877 F. Supp. 355 (W.D. Tex. 1995), rev'd, 73 F.3d 1352 (5th Cir.), rehearing en banc denied, 83 F.3d 421 (5th Cir.), cert. granted, 519 U.S. 926 (1996)
- Subsequent: District court affirmed and remanded, 119 F.3d 341 (5th Cir. 1997)

Holding
- Enactment of the Religious Freedom Restoration Act of 1993 exceeded congressional power under Section 5 of the Fourteenth Amendment.

Court membership
- Chief Justice William Rehnquist Associate Justices John P. Stevens · Sandra Day O'Connor; Antonin Scalia · Anthony Kennedy; David Souter · Clarence Thomas; Ruth Bader Ginsburg · Stephen Breyer

Case opinions
- Majority: Kennedy, joined by Rehnquist, Stevens, Thomas, Ginsburg; Scalia (all but part III-A-1)
- Concurrence: Stevens
- Concurrence: Scalia (in part), joined by Stevens
- Dissent: O'Connor, joined by Breyer (except a portion of part I)
- Dissent: Souter
- Dissent: Breyer

Laws applied
- U.S. Const. amends. I, XIV; Religious Freedom Restoration Act

City of Boerne v. Flores, 521 U.S. 507 (1997), is a landmark decision of the Supreme Court of the United States concerning the scope of Congress's power of enforcement under Section 5 of the Fourteenth Amendment. The case also had a significant impact on historic preservation.

In this case, the Court enjoined enforcement of the Religious Freedom Restoration Act (RFRA), as it applied to the states, stating the statute was an unconstitutional use of Congress's enforcement powers. Legal scholars have criticized this case stating that, "Without RFRA, questions of religious freedom will be decided in different ways in different states, and even for different religious groups." Scholars also stated that, "This places smaller religions at a relative disadvantage- a situation inconsistent with the governing ideal of the Fourteenth Amendment."

== Facts ==
The basis for dispute arose when the Catholic Archbishop of San Antonio, Patrick Flores, applied for a building permit to enlarge the 1923 mission-style St. Peter's Church in Boerne, Texas, which was originally built by German residents. The building was located in a historic district and was considered a contributing property. Local zoning authorities denied the permit, citing an ordinance governing additions and new construction in a historic district. The archbishop brought suit, challenging the ruling under the Religious Freedom Restoration Act (RFRA) of 1993. Flores argued that the Boerne congregation had outgrown the existing structure, rendering the ruling a substantial burden on the free exercise of religion without a compelling state interest.

== Religious Freedom Restoration Act ==
RFRA had been crafted as a direct response to the Supreme Court's decision in Employment Division v. Smith, when the Court had upheld, against a First Amendment challenge, an Oregon law criminalizing peyote use, which was used in Native American religious rituals. The State of Oregon won on the basis that the drug laws were "non-discriminatory laws of general applicability".

Religious groups became concerned that this case would be cited as precedent for further regulation of common religious practices and lobbied Congress for legislative protection. RFRA provided a strict scrutiny standard, requiring narrowly tailored regulation serving a compelling government interest in any case substantially burdening the free exercise of religion, regardless of the intent and general applicability of the law.

The RFRA applies to all laws passed by Congress prior to its enactment and to all future laws that are not explicitly exempted. (42 U.S. Code § 2000bb–3) Congress's power to do so was not challenged. Congress also applied the law to state and local governments - in this case, the City of Boerne - relying on the Fourteenth Amendment, particularly Section 5: "The Congress shall have power to enforce, by appropriate legislation, the provisions of this article."

== Result ==
=== District Court ===
The City of Boerne was successful at the United States District Court for the Western District of Texas; the district judge certified the question of the constitutionality of RFRA to the United States Court of Appeals for the Fifth Circuit, which found the RFRA constitutional. Boerne filed a certiorari petition to the Supreme Court. The National Trust for Historic Preservation, among other preservation organizations, filed briefs in support of Boerne.

=== Supreme Court ===
The Court, in an opinion by Justice Anthony Kennedy, struck down RFRA as it applies to the states as an unconstitutional use of Congress's enforcement powers. The Court held that it holds the sole power to define the substantive rights guaranteed by the Fourteenth Amendment—a definition to which Congress may not add and from which it may not subtract. Congress could not constitutionally enact RFRA because the law was not designed to have "congruence and proportionality" with the substantive rights that the Court had defined. Although Congress could enact "remedial" or "preventative" legislation to guarantee rights not exactly congruent with those defined by the Court, it could only do so to more effectively prevent, deter, or correct violations of those rights actually guaranteed by the Court. RFRA was seen to be disproportionate in its effects compared to its objective. Justice Kennedy wrote:

Congress' power under § 5, however, extends only to "enforc[ing]" the provisions of the Fourteenth Amendment. The Court has described the power as "remedial". The design of the Amendment and the text of § 5 are inconsistent with the suggestion that Congress has the power to decree the substance of the Fourteenth Amendment's restrictions on the States. Legislation which alters the meaning of the Free Exercise Clause cannot be said to be enforcing the Clause. Congress does not enforce a constitutional right by changing what the right is. It has been given the power "to enforce," not the power to determine what constitutes a constitutional violation. Were it not so, what Congress would be enforcing would no longer be, in any meaningful sense, the "provisions of [the Fourteenth Amendment]". (citations omitted)

Moreover, remedial or prophylactic legislation still had to show "congruence and proportionality" between the end it aimed to reach (that is, the violations it aimed to correct), and the means it chose to reach those ends—that is, the penalties or prohibitions it enacted to prevent or correct those violations. Because RFRA was not reasonably remedial or preventative, it was unconstitutional.

== Implications ==
=== Congruence and proportionality ===
Boerne is important for several reasons. One is that it introduced a completely new test for deciding whether Congress had exceeded its Section 5 powers: the "congruence and proportionality" test, a test that has proven to have great importance in the context of the Eleventh Amendment. Another reason was that it explicitly declared that the Court alone has the ability to state which rights are protected by the Fourteenth Amendment. Still another was that it had First Amendment consequences in that it spelled the end for any legislative attempts to overturn Employment Division v. Smith.

The "congruence and proportionality" requirement replaced the previous theory advanced in Katzenbach v. Morgan that the Equal Protection Clause is "a positive grant of legislative power authorizing Congress to exercise its discretion in determining the need for and nature of legislation to secure Fourteenth Amendment guarantees". Before the 1997 Boerne decision, Katzenbach v. Morgan was often interpreted as allowing Congress to go beyond, but not fall short of, the Court's interpretation of the Equal Protection Clause. But that is not how the majority opinion in Boerne interpreted Katzenbach:

There is language in our opinion in Katzenbach v. Morgan, 384 U.S. 641 (1966), which could be interpreted as acknowledging a power in Congress to enact legislation that expands the rights contained in § 1 of the Fourteenth Amendment. This is not a necessary interpretation, however, or even the best one.... If Congress could define its own powers by altering the Fourteenth Amendment's meaning, no longer would the Constitution be "superior paramount law, unchangeable by ordinary means".

The holding of Boerne said that only the Court could interpret the Constitution, in order to maintain the "traditional separation of powers between Congress and the Judiciary". Also, Boerne relied on arguments for protecting the rights that pertain to state governments based on "enumerated powers". The intent of Boerne was to prevent "a considerable congressional intrusion into the States' traditional prerogatives and general authority". The holding of Boerne specifically mentioned the state action doctrine of the Civil Rights Cases as a Court interpretation of the Equal Protection Clause that limits the "remedial or preventive" power of Congress.

=== Power of enforcement ===
Boerne introduced the "congruence and proportionality" test for deciding whether Congress had exceeded its Section 5 powers to enforce the Fourteenth Amendment. In Florida Prepaid Postsecondary Ed. Expense Bd. v. College Savings Bank (1999) the Supreme Court explained the connection between the "congruence and proportionality" test and the power of Congress to enforce the Fourteenth Amendment in the following way:

In holding that RFRA could not be justified as "appropriate" enforcement legislation under § 5, the Court emphasized that Congress' enforcement power is "remedial" in nature. Id., at 519. We recognized that "[l]egislation which deters or remedies constitutional violations can fall within the sweep of Congress' enforcement power even if in the process it prohibits conduct which is not itself unconstitutional and intrudes into 'legislative spheres of autonomy previously reserved to the States.'" Id., at 518 (citation omitted). We also noted, however, that" '[a]s broad as the congressional enforcement power is, it is not unlimited,'" ibid., and held that "Congress does not enforce a constitutional right by changing what the right is. It has been given the power 'to enforce,' not the power to determine what constitutes a constitutional violation," id., at 519. Canvassing the history of the Fourteenth Amendment and case law examining the propriety of Congress' various voting rights measures, the Court explained:

"While the line between measures that remedy or prevent unconstitutional actions and measures that make a substantive change in the governing law is not easy to discern, and Congress must have wide latitude in determining where it lies, the distinction exists and must be observed. There must be a congruence and proportionality between the injury to be prevented or remedied and the means adopted to that end. Lacking such a connection, legislation may become substantive in operation and effect." Id., at 519-520.

We thus held that for Congress to invoke § 5, it must identify conduct transgressing the Fourteenth Amendment's substantive provisions, and must tailor its legislative scheme to remedying or preventing such conduct.

=== Constitutionality of the RFRA ===
This case has been used to claim that the federal RFRA is unconstitutional. A more precise and accurate phrasing of this claim is that Boerne held the RFRA could not be constitutionally applied to state and local governments. At the federal level, the RFRA remains operative. The constitutionality of one aspect of RFRA as applied to the federal government was confirmed on February 21, 2006, as the Supreme Court ruled against the government in Gonzales v. O Centro Espirita Beneficente Uniao do Vegetal, 546 U.S. 418 (2006), which involved the use of an otherwise illegal substance in a religious ceremony, stating that the federal government must show a compelling state interest in restricting religious conduct.

=== Historic preservation ===
The Supreme Court's decision in City of Boerne made a significant impact on the states' abilities to enforce laws, including those pertaining to historic preservation. Under RFRA, an otherwise neutral state law—such as zoning, or historic preservation ordinances—needed to be scrutinized if its enforcement involved a religious group or individual. Therefore, by declaring extension of RFRA to apply against state laws unconstitutional, the ability of the states to establish and maintain historic preservation ordinances was made easier. However, in 2000, Congress enacted the Religious Land Use and Institutionalized Persons Act, in which it used the Spending Clause to require, for localities that receive federal funding, land use laws to accommodate religious freedom, essentially, as if RFRA had been ruled applicable to state law.

== See also ==
- List of United States Supreme Court cases, volume 521
- List of United States Supreme Court cases
- Lists of United States Supreme Court cases by volume
