= Religious Land Use and Institutionalized Persons Act =

United States federal law

- Long title: An Act to protect religious liberty, and for other purposes.
- Acronyms (colloquial): RLUIPA
- Nicknames: Religious Land Use and Institutionalized Persons Act of 2000
- Enacted by: the 106th United States Congress
- Effective: September 22, 2000

Citations
- Public law: 106-274
- Statutes at Large: 114 Stat. 803

Codification
- Titles amended: 42 U.S.C.: Public Health and Social Welfare
- U.S.C. sections created: 42 U.S.C. ch. 21C § 2000cc et seq.

Legislative history
- Introduced in the Senate as S. 2869 by Orrin Hatch (R–UT) on July 13, 2000; Passed the Senate on July 27, 2000 (unanimous consent); Passed the House on July 27, 2000 (without objection); Signed into law by President Bill Clinton on September 22, 2000

United States Supreme Court cases
- Cutter v. Wilkinson, 544 U.S. 709 (2005); Sossamon v. Texas, 563 U.S. 277 (2011); Holt v. Hobbs, 574 U.S. 352 (2015); Ramirez v. Collier, No. 21-5592, 595 U.S. ___ (2022); Landor v. Louisiana Department of Corrections and Public Safety, No. 23-1197, 609 U.S. ___ (2026)

The Religious Land Use and Institutionalized Persons Act (RLUIPA), Pub. L. 106–274 (text) (PDF), codified as 42 U.S.C. § 2000cc et seq., is a United States federal law that protects individuals, houses of worship, and other religious institutions from discrimination in zoning and landmarking laws. RLUIPA was enacted by the United States Congress in 2000 to correct the problems of the Religious Freedom Restoration Act (RFRA) of 1993. The act was passed in both the House of Representatives and the Senate by unanimous consent in voice votes, meaning that no objection was raised to its passage, so no written vote was taken. The S. 2869 legislation was signed into law by the President Bill Clinton on September 22, 2000.

== Previous law ==
In 1997, the United States Supreme Court held the RFRA to be unconstitutional as applied to state and local governments, in City of Boerne v. Flores, 521 U.S. 507. Unlike the RFRA, which required religious accommodation in virtually all spheres of life, RLUIPA only applies to prisoner and land use cases.

In Employment Div. Dep't of Human Resources v. Smith, 494 U.S. 872, 883–85 (1990), the Supreme Court held that a substantial burden on religious exercise was subject to very strict scrutiny where the law "lent itself to individualized governmental assessment of the reasons for the relevant conduct." It was not a case permitting exceptions for freedom of religion when generally applicable health and welfare regulations were in question, and it should be remembered that Smith lost this case (involving a denial of unemployment benefits where the litigant had used illegal drugs in a religious ceremony). In line with the scrutiny regime established in West Coast Hotel v. Parrish in 1937, the Court ruled that unless the law is not one of general applicability, regardless of specific circumstance, government may act if policy is rationally related to a legitimate government interest, even if the act imposes a substantial burden on the exercise of religion.

== Prisoners ==
In the 2005 case of Cutter v. Wilkinson, 544 U.S. 709 (2005), five prisoners in Ohio – including a Wiccan, a Satanist, and a member of a racist, purportedly Christian, sect – successfully sought to apply the protections of the act to their religious practices. The United States Court of Appeals for the Sixth Circuit had held that RLUIPA violated the Establishment Clause by impermissibly advancing religion by bestowing benefits to religious prisoners that were unavailable to non-religious prisoners. The U.S. Supreme Court disagreed, unanimously holding that RLUIPA was a permissible accommodation of religion justified by the fact that the government itself had severely burdened the prisoners' religious rights through the act of incarceration. A concurring opinion by Justice Thomas noted that the states could escape the restrictions of RLUIPA simply by refusing federal funds for state prisons. Cutter v. Wilkinson only concerns the prisoner portion of RLUIPA. The court explicitly declined to extend the rule to land use cases.

In 2008, the U.S. Commission on Civil Rights issued a report entitled "Enforcing Religious Freedom in Prison."

In a unanimous opinion issued March 15, 2011, that reverses the three-judge panel's May 2010 ruling, a limited en banc panel of 11 judges of the United States Court of Appeals for the Ninth Circuit held that an Orange County courthouse lockup is an "institution" under the Religious Land Use and Institutionalized Persons Act, meaning a Muslim woman who sued after being forced to remove her headscarf in front of strange men is entitled to the act's protections. The case is Khatib v. County of Orange, 08-56423. The lawsuit started as a result of court bailiffs ordering the woman to remove her headscarf while she was temporarily being held inside the courthouse lock up while a county court judge was deciding whether or not to revoke her misdemeanor probation (she was released that same day after the judge decided not to). The District Court had dismissed the case, with said dismissal being upheld by the three-judge appellate panel. The case has now been reversed and sent back to the trial court for further proceedings. It is the first time that a temporary holding facility (like a courthouse lockup) has been deemed to be an "institution" under the Act. The law, passed by Congress in 2000, prohibits the government from imposing a "substantial burden" on prisoners' religious practices unless officials can show a compelling need for the restrictions. The Obama administration joined Khatib in arguing that the law applied to courthouse holding cells.

In 2022, Chief Judge Diane S. Sykes of the United States Court of Appeals for the Seventh Circuit invoked RLUIPA in ruling that the rights of a Muslim prisoner at Green Bay Correctional Institution were unlawfully violated when he was strip searched by a transgender male guard.

== Zoning and land use ==
In religious land use disputes, RLUIPA's general rule is the most commonly cited and challenged section. It provides:

1. General rule. No government shall impose or implement a land use regulation in a manner that imposes a substantial burden on the religious exercise of a person, including a religious assembly or institution, unless the government can demonstrate that imposition of the burden on that person, assembly or institution
  1. is in furtherance of a compelling governmental interest; and
  2. is the least restrictive means of furthering that compelling governmental interest.
2. Scope of Application. This subsection applies in any case in which—
  1. the substantial burden is imposed in a program or activity that receives Federal financial assistance, even if the burden results from a rule of general applicability; or
  2. the substantial burden affects, or removal of that substantial burden would affect, commerce with foreign nations, among the several States, or with Indian tribes, even if the burden results from a rule of general applicability; or
  3. the substantial burden is imposed in the implementation of a land use regulation or system of land use regulations, under which a government makes, or has in place formal or informal procedures or practices that permit the government to make, individualized assessments of the proposed uses for the property involved.

42 U.S.C. § 2000cc(a).

During these disputes, the correct interpretation of the term "land use regulation" is almost always an issue. The statute defines "land use regulation" as "a zoning or landmarking law, or the application of such a law, that limits or restricts a claimant's use or development of land (including a structure affixed to land), if the claimant has an ownership, leasehold, easement, servitude, or other property interest in the regulated land or a contract or option to acquire such an interest." 42 U.S.C. § 2000cc-5(5).

=== RLUIPA and planning debate ===
The passage of RLUIPA gave rise to increasing number of legal cases whereby (local) planning authorities are sued for violating the free exercise of religion. In 2019, the Christian Fellowship Centers of New York sued the Village of Canton in New York, alleging "unequal treatment of religious assemblies." RLUIPA, therefore, generated heated discussions within professional planning communities. While its advocates (mostly in Congress) argued that this federal statute prevents urban planners from substantially burdening religious practice, its critics (many of whom were planning practitioners) maintained that RLUIPA, in fact, substantially burdens planning practice itself. The American Planning Association (APA), for example, opposed RLUIPA (and its predecessor, RFRA) from the outset, arguing that these statutes effectively change “the playing field in favor of religious institutions” and put local governments “in an untenable position.” In 2005, however, the Supreme Court ruled, in Cutter v. Wilkinson, that RLUIPA is constitutional, at least as it applies to prisons. Since the mid-2000s, therefore, the APA has been offering resources to local governments and practicing planners as to how to effectively navigate the renewed legal-religious landscape of the planning field.

=== Is eminent domain a land use regulation under RLUIPA? ===
Litigation focusing on the term "land use regulation" occasionally asks courts to decide whether RLUIPA applies to eminent domain proceedings. Generally, courts deciding this question have held that RLUIPA does not apply to eminent domain because it is not a "zoning or landmarking law." Instead, these courts have held that zoning and eminent domain are two completely different and unrelated concepts. The main argument to support this conclusion is that zoning and eminent domain are derived from two separate sources of power. The zoning power is derived from the state's police power, while the eminent domain power is derived from the Takings Clause of the United States Constitution's Fifth Amendment. However, at least one court has applied the RLUIPA in an eminent-domain case because the authority to condemn the property came from the city's zoning scheme. A court may be more inclined to find that eminent domain falls within the scope of RLUIPA if it was authorized by a zoning ordinance or comprehensive plan.

To date, no cases questioning RLUIPA's application to eminent domain have reached the Supreme Court. A 2003 Seventh Circuit case, St. John's United Church of Christ v. City of Chicago, was appealed to the U.S. Supreme Court, but the court declined to hear the appeal. A refusal to hear means that the Supreme Court did not consider the Seventh Circuit Court's decision to be obviously wrong on the legal merits, or that the facts of the particular case could have broader constitutional implications. The Supreme Court generally has a substantial workload and tends to refuse appeals which have already received due process in lower courts. A refusal to hear a case does not preclude hearing a similar case in the future, if the court feels that further judicial review is needed.

==== Cases interpreting RLUIPA's application to eminent domain ====
===== St. John's United Church of Christ v. City of Chicago =====
The controversy in this case centered around the expansion of Chicago's O'Hare International Airport. In order to expand this airport, the City needed to acquire 433 acres (175 hectares) of adjacent land through condemnation. Among the properties to be condemned were two cemeteries, one owned by St. John's United Church of Christ, and the other by Rest Haven Cemetery Association. In their amended complaint, St. John's and Rest Haven alleged that condemnation of their cemeteries was a violation of RLUIPA. After a revision to the O'Hare Modernization Project, Rest Haven's cemetery was no longer faced with condemnation and this church dropped out of the lawsuit.

St. John's Church argued that the condemnation action substantially burdened its freedom of religious practice because "[A] major tenet of its religious beliefs [was] that the remains of those buried at the [St. John's] St. Johannes Cemetery must not be disturbed until God raises these remains on the 'Day of Resurrection'." This Court had to decide whether eminent domain fit within RLUIPA's definition of a "land use regulation." The Court held that eminent domain was not a "land use regulation." The Court cited the case of Faith Temple Church v. Town of Brighton to support its position that "zoning and eminent domain are 'two distinct concepts' that involve land in 'very different ways'."

St. John's Church also argued that the O'Hare Modernization Act, which authorized the condemnations, was a zoning law, and it invoked the protection of RLUIPA's in condemnation cases derived from the Act. The Court rejected this argument and suggested that Congress would have included eminent domain in the language of RLUIPA if it had intended for the statute to cover eminent domain. After considering the case, the Seventh Circuit Court denied St. John's motion for a preliminary injunction.

===== Cottonwood Christian Center v. Cypress Redevelopment Agency =====
Cottonwood Christian Center filed a motion for a preliminary injunction to prevent the City of Cypress from taking its land through eminent domain. The controversy in this case arose when Cottonwood purchased land in Cypress and planned to build a large church and other church-related buildings on an 18-acre (7.3-hectare) plot of land. Since the church was to be built in an area that only allowed churches if they received a Conditional Use Permit (CUP) from Cypress, Cottonwood applied for a CUP. Cypress denied Cottonwood's application. Instead, the city planned to build a shopping mall that included Cottonwood's land. They later scaled the mall down to a Costco store that was solely on Cottonwood's 18-acre (7.3-hectare) plot. Cypress offered to purchase the land and Cottonwood did not accept. As a result, Cypress initiated eminent domain proceedings to acquire the property under a zoning ordinance called the Los Alamitos Race Track and Golf Course Redevelopment Project (LART Plan). The LART Plan authorized the use of eminent domain as a way to redevelop the area where Cottonwood's land was located. Cottonwood argued that because the eminent domain proceedings stemmed from the LART Plan zoning scheme, they violated RLUIPA.

The Court granted a preliminary injunction against Cypress. The Court held that RLUIPA applied in this case, and therefore, the Court used a strict scrutiny standard of review. In its analysis, the Court found that it took Cottonwood five years to identify a location and negotiate for the land. After all the church had invested, the City's actions placed a substantial burden on the church's religious exercise without presenting a compelling government interest for doing so.

===== Faith Temple Church v. Town of Brighton =====
Faith Temple Church brought an action to enjoin the Town of Brighton from condemning its property through eminent domain. Faith Temple was a church that had outgrown its needs at its original location. In order to accommodate its larger congregation, it negotiated and eventually purchased a 66-acre (27-hectare) parcel of land in January 2004. In its Comprehensive Plan for 2000, the Town had included a recommendation that this parcel be acquired. The purpose of the acquisition was to expand an adjacent town-owned park. After the church purchased the land, the Town initiated condemnation proceedings in the spring of 2004.

RLUIPA's application to eminent domain was at issue in this case because Faith Temple argued that the recommendation in the Town's Comprehensive Plan was essentially a "zoning law." Further, if the recommendation was a zoning law, then Faith Temple argued that condemnation was "the application of a zoning law" and was a violation of RLUIPA.

The Court held that RLUIPA was inapplicable to this case. The judge found that the connection between zoning and eminent domain in this case was "too attenuated to constitute the application of a zoning law." Therefore, summary judgment was granted in favor of the Town, denying injunctive relief.

===== City and County of Honolulu v. Sherman =====
This case was an appeal to the Supreme Court of Hawaii which stemmed from a Honolulu city and county ordinance. The ordinance gave the city and county eminent domain authority in "[A]ctions for [ ] lease-to-fee conversion[s] of certain leased-fee interests." Using the authority granted by the ordinance, the City of Honolulu initiated condemnation proceedings to obtain thirty-four leasehold condominium units in the Admiral Thomas condominium complex. The purpose behind the condemnation proceedings was to "conver[t] the leasehold [interests] to fee simple [interests] on behalf of forty-seven owner-occupant[s]" (the lessees).

The plaintiff-appellee in the action was the City and the defendant-appellant was First United Methodist Church as the fee owner of the Admiral Thomas condominium complex. First United counterclaimed the condemnation proceedings and cited a violation of RLUIPA. Using the Cottonwood case for support, First United argued that eminent domain is a "land use regulation" and that RLUIPA should be a defense to the City's action. While First United argued that its exercise of religion had been burdened by the eminent domain proceedings, the City argued that First United had not proven this and that "the Church's exercise of religion [was] unaffected."

Affirming the decision of the circuit court granting summary judgment in favor of the City, the Court held that RLUIPA could not be used as a defense to eminent domain proceedings authorized under the ordinance. The Court supported this holding by stating that eminent domain and zoning are different concepts and that it would not "assume that Congress simply overlooked [eminent domain] when drafting RLUIPA." Since Congress did not include the term "eminent domain" in the RLUIPA statute, the Court decided that Congress did not want it to be included. Therefore, the Court did not apply RLUIPA in this case.

==== Law review articles about RLUIPA's application to eminent domain ====
- Kris Banvard, Comment, Exercise in Frustration? A New Attempt By Congress to Restore Strict Scrutiny to Governmental Burdens on Religious Practice, 31 Cap. U. L. Rev. 279 (2003).
- Shelley Ross Saxer, Eminent Domain Actions Targeting First Amendment Land Uses, 69 Missouri L. Rev. 653 (2004).
- Stephen A. Haller, Comment, On Sacred Ground: Exploring Congress's Attempts to Rein in Discriminatory State Zoning Practices, 33 Sw. U. L. Rev. 285 (2004).
- Aaron Keesler, Note, Religious Land-Use and the Fourteenth Amendment's Enforcement Clause: How the FMLA Paved the Way to the RLUIPA's Constitutionality, 3 Ave Maria L. Rev. 315 (2005).
- G. David Mathues, Note, Shadow of a Bulldozer?: RLUIPA and Eminent Domain After Kelo, 81 Notre Dame L. Rev. 1653 (2006).
- Daniel P. Lennington, Thou Shalt Not Zone: The Overbroad Applications and Troubling Implications of RLUIPA's Land Use Provisions, 29 Seattle U. L. Rev. 805 (2006).
- Matthew Baker, Comment, RLUIPA and Eminent Domain: Probing the Boundaries of Religious Land Use Protection, 2008 BYU L. Rev. 1213 (2008).
- Daniel N. Lerman, Note, Taking the Temple: Eminent Domain and the Limits of RLUIPA, 96 Geo. L.J. 2057 (2008).
- Cristina Finetti, Comment, Limiting the Scope of the Religious Land Use and Institutionalized Persons Act: Why RLUIPA Should Not Be Amended to Regulate Eminent Domain Actions Against Religious Property, 38 Seton Hall L. Rev. 667 (2008).
