= Government interest =

Legal concept allowing the state to regulate a given matter

Government or state interest is a concept in law that allows the state to regulate a given matter. The concept may apply differently in different countries, and the limitations of what should and should not be of government interest vary, and have varied over time.

== United States ==
In the United States, the concept of government interest arises especially when certain constitutional issues are before a court of law. Under US constitutional jurisprudence, arising from US Supreme Court decisions, the courts weigh the government's interest in a particular subject matter against the impact of restrictions being imposed on the individuals' rights and interests. A compelling governmental interest may override fundamental constitutional rights only if it satisfies the strict scrutiny test. A government interest is compelling if it is essential or necessary rather than a matter of choice, preference, or discretion. When government action infringes an individual's fundamental rights, the government must show that the government's action is necessary to achieve a compelling government interest. The protection of public health and safety, including the regulation of violent crime, the requirements of national security and military necessity are considered compelling government interests. Restricting access to unapproved prescription drugs is also a compelling government interest. In Wisconsin v. Yoder, on the other hand, the requirement for compulsory education beyond 8th grade was not compelling in the case of Amish children, based on the parents' fundamental right to freedom of religion.

If the subject matter is a legitimate government interest, but does not place a restriction on a fundamental right, the courts will test its validity by applying the rational basis test. Under the Supreme Court's Equal Protection Clause jurisprudence, when the government classifies a restriction based on gender, for example, it must show that its actions further an important government interest, under the intermediate scrutiny standard.

Protecting residential privacy has been recognized as a significant government interest by the U.S. Court of Appeals for the 8th Circuit.

The burden of proof falls on the state in cases that require strict scrutiny or intermediate scrutiny, but not the rational basis.

== Europe ==
In Europe, 47 out of 49 countries are part of the European Convention on Human Rights which contains various human rights that the states party to the convention are bound by. Most of these rights contain "limitations" which means that the right is not absolute and can be limited by a state if it follows certain criteria set out by the convention. For example, all limitations must be "prescribed by law" (i.e. not arbitrary and not by a vague law), they must follow a legitimate aim and be necessary in a democratic society. Only the prohibition of torture cannot be limited in any circumstances.

The approach in Europe is very different to the United States where the courts have not been willing to recognize a broad government interest in relation to the 1st or 2nd amendments.

== See also ==
- Public interest
- Public morality
- National interest, a related concept in international relations
- Wisconsin v. Yoder
