= Employment Division v. Smith =

Employment Division, Department of Human Resources of Oregon v. Smith
- Supreme Court of the United States

Argued November 6, 1989 Decided April 17, 1990
- Full case name: Employment Division, Department of Human Resources of the State of Oregon, et al. v. Alfred Smith
- Citations: 494 U.S. 872 (more) 110 S. Ct. 1595; 108 L. Ed. 2d 876; 1990 U.S. LEXIS 2021; 58 U.S.L.W. 4433; 52 Fair Empl. Prac. Cas. (BNA) 855; 53 Empl. Prac. Dec. (CCH) ¶ 39,826; Unemployment Ins. Rep. (CCH) ¶ 21,933

Case history
- Prior: Decision against plaintiff (Emp. App. Bd., 1984); reversed and remanded, 75 Or.App. 764, 709 P.2d 246 (1985); affirmed without remand, 301 Or. 209, 721 P.2d 445 (1986); vacated with question to the state court, 485 U.S. 660 (1988); re-affirmed, 307 Ore. 68, 763 P.2d 146 (1988); cert. granted, 489 U.S. 1077 (1989).
- Subsequent: Rehearing denied, 496 U.S. 913 (1990); Employee Appeals Board affirmed, 310 Or. 376, 799 P.2d 148 (1990)

Holding
- Neutral laws of general applicability do not violate the Free Exercise Clause of the First Amendment.

Court membership
- Chief Justice William Rehnquist Associate Justices William J. Brennan Jr. · Byron White; Thurgood Marshall · Harry Blackmun; John P. Stevens · Sandra Day O'Connor; Antonin Scalia · Anthony Kennedy

Case opinions
- Majority: Scalia, joined by Rehnquist, White, Stevens, Kennedy
- Concurrence: O'Connor (in judgment), joined by Brennan, Marshall, Blackmun (parts I, II, without concurring in judgment)
- Dissent: Blackmun, joined by Brennan, Marshall

Laws applied
- U.S. Const. amends. I, XIV

Employment Division, Department of Human Resources of Oregon v. Smith, 494 U.S. 872 (1990), is a landmark decision of the United States Supreme Court, where the Court held that the state could deny unemployment benefits to a person fired for violating a state prohibition on the use of peyote even though the use of the drug was part of a religious ritual. Although states have the power to accommodate otherwise illegal acts performed in pursuit of religious beliefs, they are not required to do so.

In 1993, in response to the ruling, Congress passed the Religious Freedom Restoration Act, which aimed to apply strict scrutiny to laws restricting religious freedom, reinstating the Sherbert Test.

== Facts ==
Alfred Leo Smith and Galen Black were members of the Native American Church and counselors at a private drug rehabilitation clinic. They were fired because they had ingested peyote, a powerful entheogen, as part of religious ceremonies at the Native American Church. At the time, intentional possession of peyote was a crime under Oregon law without an affirmative defense for religious use. The counselors filed a claim for unemployment compensation with the Employment Division of the Oregon Department of Human Resources, but the claim was denied because the reason for their dismissal was deemed work-related "misconduct". The Oregon Court of Appeals reversed that ruling, holding that denying them unemployment benefits for their religious use of peyote violated their right to exercise their religion. The Oregon Supreme Court agreed, although it relied not on the fact that peyote use was a crime but on the fact that the state's justification for withholding the benefits—preserving the "financial integrity" of the workers' compensation fund—was outweighed by the burden imposed on the employees' exercise of their religion. The state appealed to the U.S. Supreme Court, again arguing that denying the unemployment benefits was proper because possession of peyote was a crime.

The U.S. Supreme Court let stand the Oregon Supreme Court's judgment regarding Smith and Black and returned the case to the Oregon courts to determine whether or not sacramental use of illegal drugs violated Oregon's state drug laws (485 U.S. 660 (1988)). On remand, the Oregon Supreme Court concluded that while Oregon drug law prohibited the consumption of illegal drugs for sacramental religious uses, this prohibition violated the Free Exercise Clause of the First Amendment. The state asked the U.S. Supreme Court to review this second decision of the Oregon Supreme Court, and it agreed to do so. In earlier rulings like Sherbert v. Verner (1963), the Court had decided that the government could not condition access to unemployment insurance or other benefits on an individual's willingness to give up conduct required by their religion. But the Supreme Court did not find that this principle also applied when the conduct in question is justifiably prohibited by law.

Of particular importance was that the Oregon law was not directed at the Native Americans' religious practice specifically; thus, it was deemed constitutional when applied to all citizens:

It is a permissible reading of the [free exercise clause]...to say that if prohibiting the exercise of religion is not the object of the [law] but merely the incidental effect of a generally applicable and otherwise valid provision, the First Amendment has not been offended.... To make an individual's obligation to obey such a law contingent upon the law's coincidence with his religious beliefs, except where the State's interest is "compelling"–permitting him, by virtue of his beliefs, "to become a law unto himself,"–contradicts both constitutional tradition and common sense. To adopt a true "compelling interest" requirement for laws that affect religious practice would lead towards anarchy.

== Majority opinion ==
The majority opinion was delivered by Justice Antonin Scalia. The First Amendment forbids government from prohibiting the "free exercise" of religion. This means that government may not regulate beliefs as such, either by compelling certain beliefs or forbidding them. Religious belief frequently entails the performance of physical acts—assembling for worship, consumption of bread and wine, abstaining from certain foods or behaviors. Government could no more ban the performance of these physical acts when engaged in for religious reasons than it could ban the religious beliefs that compel those actions in the first place. "It would doubtless be unconstitutional, for example, to ban the casting of statues that are to be used for worship purposes or to prohibit bowing down before a golden calf."

But Oregon's ban on the possession of peyote is not a law specifically aimed at a physical act engaged in for a religious reason. Rather, it is a law that applies to everyone who might possess peyote, for whatever reason—a "neutral law of general applicability". Scalia characterized the employees' argument as an attempt to use their religious motivation to use peyote in order to place themselves beyond the reach of Oregon's neutral, generally applicable ban on possession of peyote. The Court held that the First Amendment's protection of the "free exercise" of religion does not allow a person to use a religious motivation as a reason not to obey such generally applicable laws. Citing Reynolds v. United States (1878), Scalia wrote, "To permit this would be to make the professed doctrines of religious belief superior to the law of the land, and in effect to permit every citizen to become a law unto himself." Thus, the Court had held that religious beliefs did not excuse people from complying with laws forbidding polygamy, child labor laws, Sunday closing laws, laws requiring citizens to register for Selective Service, or laws requiring the payment of Social Security taxes.

By contrast, the cases in which the Court had allowed a religious motivation to exempt a person from a neutral, generally applicable law involved the assertion of both the right of free exercise along with some other right. Thus, religious publishers are exempt from a law requiring them to obtain a license if that license may be denied to any publisher the government deems nonreligious. The government may not tax religious solicitors. The government may not require the Amish to send their children to school because their religion demands otherwise, and Amish parents, like all parents, have the right to direct the education of their children. Because Smith and Black were not asserting a hybrid right, they could not claim a religious exemption under the First Amendment from Oregon's ban on peyote.

Smith and Black had argued that, at the very least, the Court should uphold Oregon's ban on peyote as applied to them only if Oregon had a compelling interest in prohibiting their religious use of peyote. The Court had invalidated three other unemployment compensation restrictions under this standard. But those other restrictions themselves required consideration of individualized circumstances, such as when unemployment compensation was denied to a person who could not, for religious reasons, work on Saturdays. If a state has in place a system of individualized consideration, the constitution does not allow the state to refuse to extend that system to cases of religious hardship without a compelling reason.

The difference between the other unemployment cases the Court had decided and this case was that Oregon's ban on peyote applied to everyone equally—in other words, it made no room for individualized consideration of the reasons a person might want to use peyote.

The "compelling government interest" requirement seems benign, because it is familiar from other fields. But using it as the standard that must be met before the government may accord different treatment on the basis of race, see, e.g., Palmore v. Sidoti, or before the government may regulate the content of speech, see, e.g., Sable Communications of California v. FCC, is not remotely comparable to using it for the purpose asserted here. What it produces in those other fields -- equality of treatment, and an unrestricted flow of contending speech -- are constitutional norms; what it would produce here -- a private right to ignore generally applicable laws -- is a constitutional anomaly. ....The rule respondents favor would open the prospect of constitutionally required religious exemptions from civic obligations of almost every conceivable kind -- ranging from compulsory military service to the payment of taxes to health and safety regulation such as manslaughter and child neglect laws, compulsory vaccination laws, drug laws, and traffic laws; to social welfare legislation such as minimum wage laws, child labor laws, animal cruelty laws, environmental protection laws, and laws providing for equality of opportunity for the races.

Rather than interpret the First Amendment to require the exemption that Smith and Black sought, the Court encouraged them to seek redress from the legislature. It observed that Arizona, Colorado, and New Mexico already specifically exempted religious uses from their otherwise generally applicable peyote bans. "Just as a society that believes in the negative protection accorded to the press by the First Amendment is likely to enact laws that affirmatively foster the dissemination of the printed word, so also a society that believes in the negative protection afforded to religious belief can be expected to be solicitous of that value in its legislation as well." Requiring claims for religious exemptions to be vetted by the legislative process might put less popular religions at a disadvantage, but the Court held that this situation was preferable to the relative anarchy that would result from "a system in which each conscience is a law unto itself."

== Concurring opinion ==
Justice Sandra Day O'Connor disagreed with the majority's analytical framework, preferring to apply the traditional compelling interest test to Oregon's ban on peyote. She agreed with the Court's initial premise that the Free Exercise Clause applied to religiously motivated conduct as well as religious beliefs, but pointed out that even a so-called neutral law of general applicability imposes a burden on a person's exercise of religion if that law prevents a person from engaging in religiously motivated conduct or requires them to engage in conduct forbidden by their religion. The First Amendment has to reach both laws that expressly target religion as well as generally applicable laws; otherwise, the law would relegate the constitutional protection of the free exercise of religion to "the barest level of minimum scrutiny that the Equal Protection Clause already provides".

But First Amendment rights are not absolute. The law tolerates burdens on the free exercise of religion that serve a compelling governmental interest and are narrowly tailored to meet that interest. "The compelling interest test effectuates the First Amendment's command that religious liberty is an independent liberty, that it occupies a preferred position, and that the Court will not permit encroachment upon this liberty, whether direct or indirect, unless required by clear and compelling governmental interests of the highest order."

Thus the critical question in this case is whether exempting respondents from the State's general criminal prohibition "will unduly interfere with fulfillment of the governmental interest," O'Connor wrote. "Although the question is close, I would conclude that uniform application of Oregon's criminal prohibition is 'essential to accomplish,' its overriding interest in preventing the physical harm caused by the use of a Schedule I controlled substance."

First, O'Connor considered the interest of Smith and Black. There was no doubt that the exemption from Oregon's ban on peyote was not a pretext for Smith and Black. It was directly linked to the exercise of their religious beliefs, the sincerity of which the Court does not and should not question. Peyote is a sacrament in the Native American Church; thus, members must "choose between carrying out the ritual embodying their religious beliefs and avoidance of criminal prosecution. That choice is ... more than sufficient to trigger First Amendment scrutiny."

Despite this choice, "Oregon's criminal prohibition represents that state's judgment that the possession and use of controlled substances, even by only one person, is inherently harmful and dangerous," O'Connor wrote. "Because the health effects caused by the use of controlled substances exist regardless of the motivation of the user, the use of such substances, even for religious purposes, violates the very purpose of the laws that prohibit them." Furthermore, society's interest in preventing trafficking in controlled substances was similarly central to effectuating Oregon's ban on peyote. O'Connor likewise suggested that Smith and Black seek redress in the state legislature and not the courts, for the fact that other states allow religious use of peyote does not compel Oregon to follow suit. Indeed, not even Smith and Black disputed that Oregon's interest in outlawing peyote was compelling.

== Dissenting opinion ==
Justice Harry Blackmun agreed with O'Connor that the compelling interest test should apply to Oregon's ban on peyote, but disagreed with her that the ban was supported by a compelling interest that was narrowly tailored. Blackmun began by "articulat[ing] in precise terms the state interest involved" in the ban. He focused narrowly on the state's interest in not exempting religious use from its otherwise generally applicable ban on peyote rather than the state's broader interest in "fighting the critical 'war on drugs.'" Blackmun framed the issue as he did because "failure to reduce the competing interests to the same plane of generality tends to distort the weighing process in the state's favor." He questioned whether Oregon actually enforced its criminal prohibition on peyote against religious users, noting that it had not actually prosecuted Smith or Black. Because Oregon had not prosecuted any religious users of peyote, its "asserted interest thus amounts only to the symbolic preservation of an unfettered prohibition. But a government interest in symbolism, even symbolism for so worthy a cause as the abolition of unlawful drugs, cannot suffice to abrogate the constitutional rights of individuals."

Oregon also claimed an interest in protecting the health and safety of its citizens from the dangers of illegal drug use, but there was no evidence that religious use of peyote actually harmed anyone. That peyote was a Schedule I drug did not persuade Blackmun. The federal government may have placed peyote on Schedule I, but the federal government also tolerated the religious use of peyote. In addition, other Schedule I drugs (such as cannabis) have lawful uses. Religious use was not recreational use; the Native American Church ritual in which peyote is consumed is heavily supervised, thus mitigating Oregon's health and safety concerns. The religious use occurs in a context that harmonizes with the state's general ban. The Native American Church discourages nonreligious use of peyote, and promotes family harmony, self-reliance, and abstinence from alcohol. Research suggests that religious use of peyote can help curb "the tragic effects of alcoholism on the Native American population." And as for the state's interest in abolishing drug trafficking, Blackmun pointed out that there is "practically no illegal traffic in peyote."

Finally, Blackmun expressed concern for "the severe impact of a state's restrictions on the adherents of a minority religion." Eating peyote is "an act of worship and communion," a "means for communicating with the Great Spirit." If Oregon is a hostile environment in which to practice the Native American religion, its adherents might be forced to "migrate to some other and more tolerant region." Blackmun found it inconsistent with First Amendment values to denigrate an "unorthodox" religious practice in this way.

== Aftermath ==
Smith set the precedent "that laws affecting certain religious practices do not violate the right to free exercise of religion as long as the laws are neutral, generally applicable, and not motivated by animus to religion." In other words: When "the government has a 'generally applicable' law or regulation and enforces the law neutrally, the government's action is presumptively legitimate, even if it has some 'incidental' adverse impact on a religious group or person."

Three years later, Congress passed the Religious Freedom Restoration Act of 1993 (RFRA), which required the application of strict scrutiny to laws restricting religious freedom. In response to the Supreme Court's 1997 ruling in City of Boerne v. Flores, which declared the RFRA unconstitutional as applied to the states, Congress passed the Religious Land Use and Institutionalized Persons Act (RLUIPA) in 2000, which grants special privileges to religious landowners and prisoners.

In Fulton v. City of Philadelphia (2021), the Supreme Court ruled that certain services like foster care certification fell outside of public accommodations covered by the anti-discriminatory nature of Smith, and as a result, discriminatory policies related to these services could be reviewed through strict scrutiny; in the specific case of Fulton, the Supreme Court ruled that Philadelphia's policy not to contract a religious-based foster care agency because of its anti-same sex couple policy violated its freedom of religious exercise rights. In a 77-page concurrence, Justice Samuel Alito, joined by Justices Clarence Thomas and Neil Gorsuch, wrote that he would have overruled Smith.

== See also ==
- List of United States Supreme Court cases
