= Strict scrutiny =

Standard of judicial review in US constitutional law

In U.S. constitutional law, when a law infringes upon a fundamental constitutional right, the court may apply the strict scrutiny standard. Strict scrutiny holds the challenged law as presumptively invalid unless the government can demonstrate that the law or regulation is necessary to achieve a "compelling state interest". The government must also demonstrate that the law is "narrowly tailored" to achieve that compelling purpose, and that it uses the "least restrictive means" to achieve that purpose. Failure to meet this standard will result in striking the law as unconstitutional.

Strict scrutiny is the highest and most stringent standard of judicial review in the United States and is part of the levels of judicial scrutiny that US courts use to determine whether a constitutional right or principle should give way to the government's interest against observance of the principle. The lesser standards are rational basis review and exacting or intermediate scrutiny. These standards are applied to statutes and government action at all levels of government within the United States.

The notion of "levels of judicial scrutiny", including strict scrutiny, was introduced in Footnote 4 of the U.S. Supreme Court decision in United States v. Carolene Products Co. (1938), one of a series of decisions testing the constitutionality of New Deal legislation. One of the most notable cases in which the Supreme Court applied the strict scrutiny standard and found the government's actions constitutional was Korematsu v. United States (1944), since overruled, in which the Court upheld the forced relocation of Japanese Americans in internment camps during World War II. Another example is the D.C. Circuit Court's 2007 ruling in Abigail Alliance v. von Eschenbach that compelling government interest was demonstrated in the restriction of unapproved prescription drugs.

The burden of proof falls on the state in cases that require strict scrutiny or intermediate scrutiny, but not the rational basis.

== Applicability ==
U.S. courts apply the strict scrutiny standard in two contexts:

- when a fundamental constitutional right is infringed, particularly those found in the Bill of Rights and those the court has deemed a fundamental right protected by the Due Process Clause or "liberty clause" of the 14th Amendment, or
- when a government action applies to a "suspect classification", such as race or national origin.

To satisfy the strict scrutiny standard, the law or policy must:

- be justified by a compelling governmental interest. While the Courts have never brightly defined how to determine if an interest is compelling, the concept generally refers to something necessary or crucial, as opposed to something merely preferred. Examples include national security, preserving the lives of a large number of individuals, and not violating explicit constitutional protections.
- be narrowly tailored to achieve that goal or interest. If the government action encompasses too much (is overbroad) or fails to address essential aspects of the compelling interest, then the rule is not considered narrowly tailored.
- be the least restrictive means for achieving that interest: there must not be a less restrictive way to effectively achieve the compelling government interest. The test will be met even if there is another method that is equally the least restrictive. Some legal scholars consider this "least restrictive means" requirement part of being narrowly tailored, but the Court generally evaluates it separately.

Legal scholars, including judges and professors, often say that strict scrutiny is "strict in theory, fatal in fact", since popular perception is that most laws subjected to the standard are struck down. Sandra Day O'Connor explicitly denied this in Adarand Constructors, Inc. v. Peña in 1995, and an empirical study of strict scrutiny decisions in the federal courts found that laws survive strict scrutiny more than 30% of the time. In one area of law, religious liberty, laws that burden religious liberty survived strict scrutiny review in nearly 60% of cases; however, a discrepancy was found in the type of religious liberty claim, with most claims for exemption from law failing and no allegedly discriminatory laws surviving.

Harvard law professor Richard Fallon Jr. has written that rather than being neatly applied, under strict scrutiny, "interpretation is more varied than is often recognized", a view that has been acknowledged by U.S. Supreme Court Justice Clarence Thomas (e.g., in his dissent (part III) in Hellerstedt). The compelling state interest test is distinguishable from the rational basis test, which involves claims that do not involve a suspect class or fundamental right, but still arise under the Equal Protection Clause or Due Process Clause. A presumption of constitutionality does not apply under strict scrutiny: the burden to prove the constitutionality of a law shifts to the government lawyers.

== Suspect classification ==
The Supreme Court has established standards for determining whether a statute or policy must satisfy strict scrutiny. One ruling suggested that the affected class of people must have experienced a history of discrimination, must be definable as a group based on "obvious, immutable, or distinguishing characteristics", or be a minority or "politically powerless". The Court has consistently found that classifications based on race, national origin, and alienage require strict scrutiny review. The Supreme Court held that all race-based classifications must be subjected to strict scrutiny in Adarand Constructors v. Peña, 515 U.S. 200 (1995), overruling Metro Broadcasting, Inc. v. FCC (89-453), 497 U.S. 547 (1990), which had briefly allowed the use of intermediate scrutiny to analyze the Equal Protection implications of race-based classifications in the narrow category of affirmative-action programs established by the federal government in the broadcasting field.

== De jure versus de facto discrimination ==
As applied in Korematsu v. United States, which upheld the race-based exclusion order and internment during World War II of Japanese Americans who had resided on the West Coast of the United States, strict scrutiny was limited to instances of de jure discrimination, where a racial classification is written into the language of a statute. The Supreme Court's decision in Village of Arlington Heights v. Metropolitan Housing Development Corp. provided further definition to the concept of intent and clarified three particular areas in which intent of a particular administrative or legislative decision becomes apparent, the presence of any of which demands the harsher equal protection test. The Court must use strict scrutiny if one of these tests, among others, is met:

1. the impact is so "stark and dramatic" as to be unexplainable on non-racial grounds, as in Yick Wo v. Hopkins (1886);
2. the historical background of the decision suggests intent;
3. the legislative and administrative records leading up to the decision show intent.

=== Notable cases ===
- Skinner v. State of Oklahoma, ex. rel. Williamson, 316 U.S. 535 (1942), cf. Buck v. Bell 274 U.S. 200 (1927), banning forced sterilization under certain circumstances.
- Brown v. Board of Education, 347 U.S. 483 (1954), ending segregation in public schools
- Sherbert v. Verner, 374 U.S. 398 (1963), invalidating state law denying unemployment benefits to employees fired for refusing to violate their religious belief
- Griswold v. Connecticut, 381 U.S. 479 (1965), striking down prohibition of contraceptives
- Loving v. Virginia, 897 U.S. 113 (1967), striking down prohibition of interracial marriage
- Wisconsin v. Yoder, 406 U.S. 205 (1972), striking down law requiring all minors to attend public school, thereby permitting Amish to remove their children from public schools after 8th grade
- Employment Division v. Smith, 494 U.S. 872 (1990), allowing states to deny unemployment benefits to those using illegal drugs for religious purposes
- City of Boerne v. Flores, 521 U.S. 507 (1997), holding that some zoning laws may be an undue restriction of religious freedom
- Gonzales v. O Centro Espírita Beneficente União do Vegetal, 546 U.S. 418 (2006), allowing religious use of illegal drugs

== See also ==
- Proportionality (law)
- Undue burden standard
