= Kapparot =

Atonement ritual practiced by Orthodox Jews

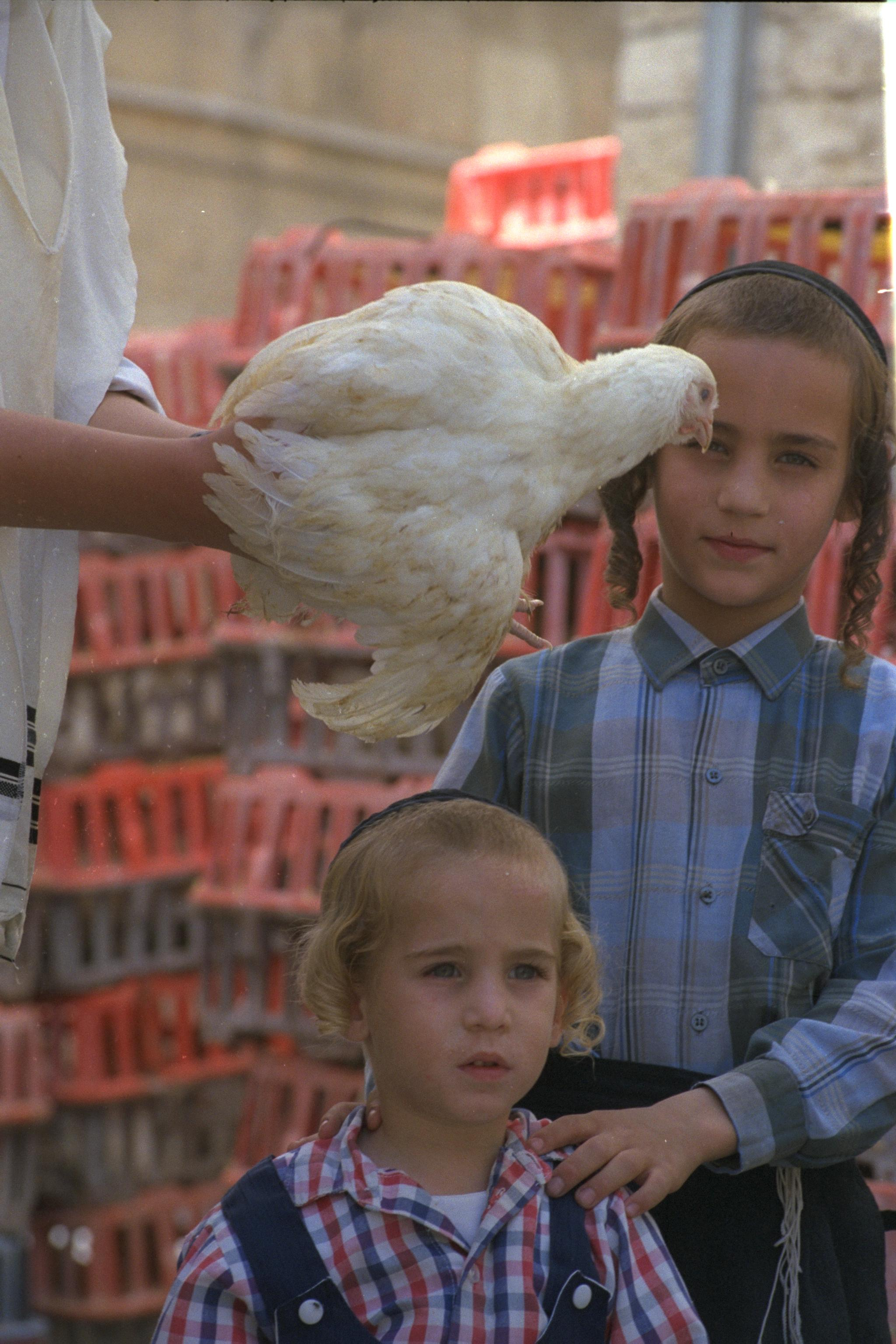
Kapparot ritual on the eve of Yom Kippur

Kapparot (Hebrew: כפרות, Ashkenazi transliteration: Kapporois, Kapores) is a customary atonement ritual practiced by Rabbinic Jews on the eve of Yom Kippur. This is a practice in which either money is waved over a person's head, or a chicken is waved over the head and then slaughtered in accordance with halachic rules.

== Etymology ==
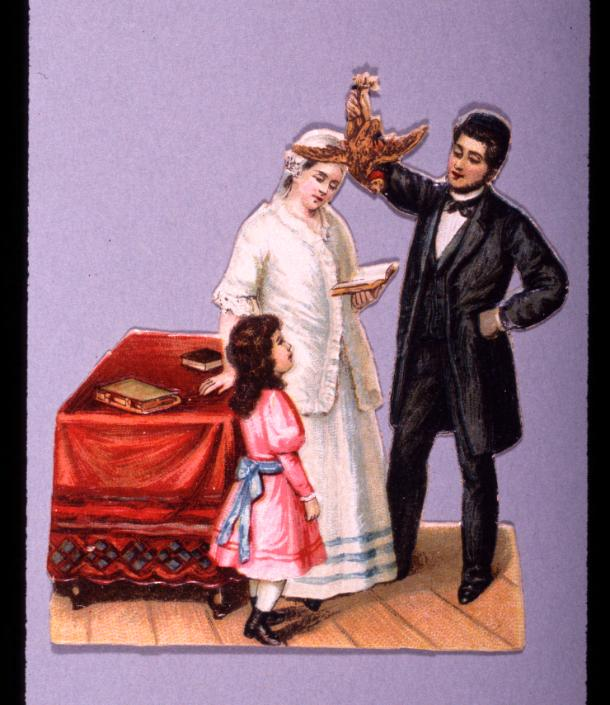
Lithograph of Kapparot, late 19th/early 20th century

Kapparah (כפרה), the singular of kapparot, means "atonement" and comes from the Semitic root כ־פ־ר k-p-r, which means 'to cover'.

== Practice ==
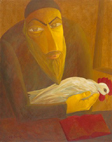
The Shochet with Rooster by Israel Tsvaygenbaum, 1997

On the afternoon before Yom Kippur, one prepares an item to be donated to the poor for consumption at the pre-Yom Kippur meal, recites the two biblical passages of Psalms 107:17–20 and Job 33:23–24, and then swings the prepared charitable donation over one's head three times while reciting a short prayer three times.

=== Using a rooster ===
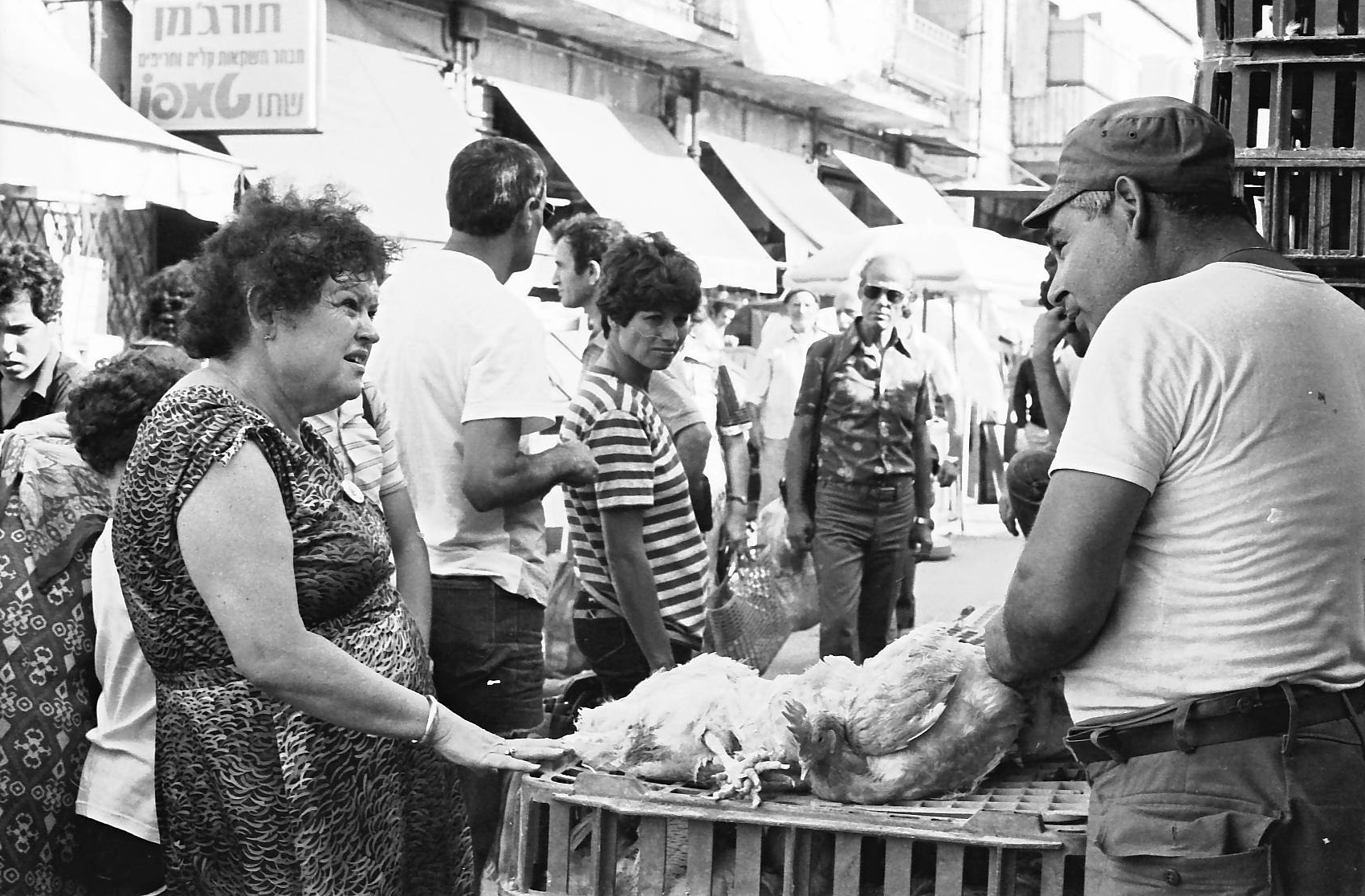
A vendor at Mahane Yehuda Market in Jerusalem sells roosters for kapparot before Yom Kippur, circa 1983.

In one variant of the practice of kapparot, the item to be donated to charity is a rooster. In this case, the rooster is waved over one's head while still alive, and a prayer is recited expressing the hope that if one were destined to receive harsh divine decrees in the new year, the decrees should be transferred to the rooster in the merit of the charity that is about to be performed.

After the kapparot ritual is concluded, the rooster is treated as a normal kosher poultry product, i.e., it is slaughtered according to the laws of shechita. It is then given to charity for consumption at the pre-Yom Kippur meal. In modern times, this variant of the ritual is performed with a rooster for men and a hen for women.

When a rooster or hen is used, the conclusion of the recited prayer translates as:

This is my exchange, this is my substitute, this is my atonement. This rooster (hen) will go to its death, while I will enter and proceed to a good long life and to peace.

According to Rabbi Eliyahu Kitov, one should not think of the kapparot themselves as a source of atonement. Rather, the chickens are intended to serve as a means of raising one's awareness that he may be deserving of death because of his sins, thereby motivating him to repent and ask God for mercy before the Day of Atonement.

=== Using money ===
In a second variant of the practice of kapparot, a bag of money is swung around the head and then given to charity.

In this case, the conclusion of the recited prayer translates as:

This is my exchange, this is my substitute, this is my atonement. This money will go to charity, while I will enter and proceed to a good long life and to peace.

== Sources ==
The practice of kapparot is mentioned for the first time by Amram ben Sheshna of Sura Academy in Babylonia in 670 and later by Natronai ben Hilai, also of Sura Academy, in 853. According to Joshua Trachtenberg, the rite probably originated toward the end of the Talmudic period. Jewish scholars in the ninth century explained that since the Hebrew word גבר means both "man" and "rooster", a rooster may substitute as a religious and spiritual vessel in place of a man.

== Historical controversy ==
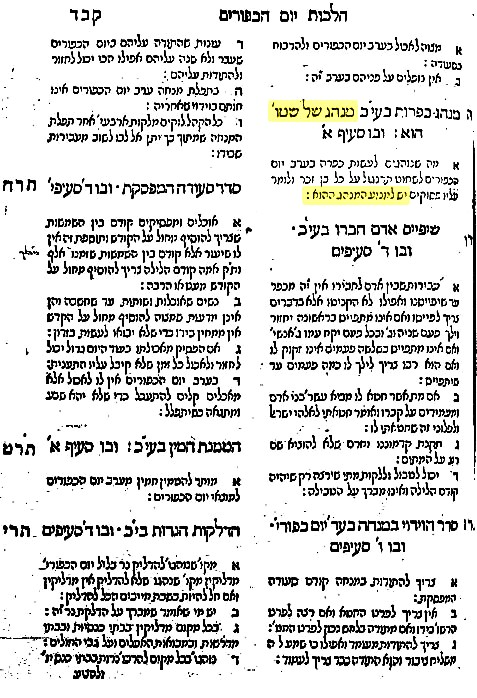
The original printing of Joseph ben Ephraim Karo's Shulchan Aruch, Orach Chayim, ch. 605, states in the chapter heading that kapparot is a nonsensical custom that should be abolished. Later editions removed this. However, according to Samson Morpurgo (Shemesh Tsedakah, 1:23), the chapter heading was not written by Rabbi Karo but was inserted by the publishers.

Kapparot was strongly opposed by some rabbis, among them Nachmanides, Shlomo ben Aderet, and the Sephardi rabbi Joseph ben Ephraim Karo in the Shulchan Aruch. According to the Mishnah Berurah, his reasoning was based on the caution that it is similar to non-Jewish rites.

The Ashkenazi rabbi Moses Isserles disagreed with Karo and encouraged kapparot. In Ashkenazi communities especially, Rabbi Isserles' position came to be widely accepted, since Ashkenazi Jews will generally follow the halachic rulings of Rabbi Isserles where the Sephardic and Ashkenazic customs differ. It was also approved by Asher ben Jehiel (c. 1250–1327) and his son Jacob ben Asher (1269–1343) and other commentators. The ritual was also supported by Kabbalists, such as Isaiah Horowitz and Isaac Luria, who recommended the selection of a white rooster as a reference to Isaiah 1:18 and who found other mystic allusions in the prescribed formulas. Consequently, the practice became generally accepted among the Ashkenazi Jews and Hasidim of Eastern Europe. The Mishnah Berurah agrees with Rabbi Isserles, solidifying support for the practice among Lithuanian Jews as well. The Mishnah Berurah only supports the use of money (i.e., not a chicken) if there might be a problem with the slaughter due to haste or fatigue.

In the late 19th-century work Kaf Hachaim, Yaakov Chaim Sofer approves of the custom for Sephardi Jews as well.

== Animal cruelty controversy ==
Some Jews oppose the use of chickens for kapparot on the grounds of tza'ar ba'alei chayim, the principle banning cruelty to animals.

The American nonprofit PETA has made the claim that more than two-thirds of all the slaughtered birds are simply thrown in the trash, while the kapparot organizers claim that the sites donate the dead chickens to feed the poor.

On Yom Kippur eve 2005, a number of caged chickens were abandoned in rainy weather as part of a kapparot operation in Brooklyn, New York; some of these starving and dehydrated chickens were subsequently rescued by the American Society for the Prevention of Cruelty to Animals. Jacob Kalish, an Orthodox Jewish man from Williamsburg, Brooklyn, was charged with animal cruelty for the drowning deaths of 35 of these kapparot chickens. In response to such reports of the mistreatment of chickens, Jewish animal rights organizations have begun to picket public observances of animal kapparot, particularly in Israel.

Proponents of the animal kapparot ritual in the United States argue the practice to be constitutionally protected as an exercise of freedom of religion in the United States, which is further supported by a 1993 Supreme Court of the United States decision in the case of Church of the Lukumi Babalu Aye v. City of Hialeah. In that case, the court upheld the right of Santería adherents to practice ritual animal sacrifice, with Justice Anthony Kennedy stating in the decision, "Religious beliefs need not be acceptable, logical, consistent or comprehensible to others in order to merit First Amendment protection" (quoted by Justice Kennedy from the opinion by Justice Warren E. Burger in Thomas v. Review Board of the Indiana Employment Security Division, 450 U.S. 707 (1981)). However, the Supreme Court's principal concern in its decision was that the City of Hialeah specifically targeted a religious ritual, curbing the religious rights of a specific community, which conflicts with the First Amendment's Free Exercise Clause.

== See also ==
- Atonement in Judaism
- Kosher slaughterer
- Minhag
- Repentance in Judaism
- Tashlikh
