= Wood v. Georgia =

Wood v. Georgia may refer to:

- Wood v. Georgia (1962), 370 U.S. 375 (1962), a U.S. Supreme Court case about free-speech protection for criticism of an ongoing grand jury investigation
- Wood v. Georgia (1981), 450 U.S. 261 (1981), a U.S. Supreme Court case about the constitutionality of imprisoning a probationer for failing to pay fine installments
