= Freedom of religion =

Human right to practice, or not, a religion without conflict from governing powers

Freedom of religion or religious liberty, also known as freedom of religion or belief (FoRB), is a principle that supports the freedom of an individual or community, in public or private, to manifest religion or belief in teaching, practice, worship, and observance. It also includes the right not to profess any religion or belief or not to practice a religion, often called freedom from religion.

Freedom of religion is considered by most nations to be a fundamental human right. Freedom of religion is protected in all the most important international human rights conventions, such as the United Nations International Covenant on Civil and Political Rights, the American Convention on Human Rights, the European Convention on Human Rights, and the United Nations Convention on the Rights of the Child. In a country with a state religion, freedom of religion is generally considered to mean that the government permits religious practices of other communities besides the state religion, and does not persecute believers in other faiths or those who have no faith. The concept of religious liberty includes, and some say requires, secular liberalism, and excludes authoritarian versions of secularism.

Freedom of religion includes, at a minimum, freedom of belief (the right to believe whatever a person, group, or religion wishes, including all forms of irreligion, such as atheism, humanism, existentialism, or other forms of non-belief), but some feel freedom of religion must include freedom of practice (the right to practice a religion or belief openly and outwardly in a public manner, including the right not to practice any religion). A third term, freedom of worship, may be considered synonymous with both freedom of belief and freedom of practice or may be considered to fall between the two terms.

Crucial in the consideration of religious liberty is the question of whether religious practices and religiously motivated actions that would otherwise violate secular law should be permitted due to the safeguarding freedom of religion. This issue is addressed in numerous court cases, including the United States Supreme Court cases Reynolds v. United States and Wisconsin v. Yoder, and in the European law cases of S.A.S. v. France, as well as numerous other jurisdictions.

Symbols of religious freedom are seen in significant locations around the world, such as the Statue of Liberty in New York, which was initially created to commemorate the abolition of slavery in the US in 1865, but later came to represent hope for religious refugees; the Bevis Marks Synagogue in London, which dates from 1701 and is the oldest continuously active synagogue in Europe; and the Golden Temple in Amritsar, India, a symbol of religious inclusivity and freedom of worship. Other key sites include the Bahá'í Gardens in Haifa, Israel, which emphasize the unity of humanity and freedom of belief, and Lutherstadt Wittenberg in Germany, where Martin Luther's actions sparked the Reformation, symbolizing a fight for religious reform and liberty.

== History ==
In a historic setting freedom to worship has often been limited in practice through punitive taxation, repressive social legislation, and political disenfranchisement. An example commonly cited by scholars is the status of dhimmis under Islamic sharia law. Stemming from the Pact of Umar and literally meaning "protected individuals", it is often argued that non-Muslims possessing the dhimmi status in medieval Islamic societies enjoyed greater freedoms than non-Christians in most medieval European societies, while duly noting that the protection was limited because of regulation by and obligations to government such as taxation (compare jizya and zakat) and military service differed between religions. In modern concepts of religious freedom, the law is usually blind to religious affiliation.

In Antiquity, a syncretic point of view often allowed communities of traders to operate under their own customs. When street mobs of separate quarters clashed in a Hellenistic or Roman city, the issue was generally perceived to be an infringement of community rights.

Cyrus the Great established the Achaemenid Empire ca. 550 BC, and initiated a general policy of permitting religious freedom throughout the empire, documenting this on the Cyrus Cylinder.

Freedom of religious worship was established in the Buddhist Maurya Empire of ancient India by Ashoka the Great in the 3rd century BC, which was encapsulated in the Edicts of Ashoka.

Greek–Jewish clashes at Cyrene in 73 AD and 117 AD and in Alexandria in 115 AD provide examples of cosmopolitan cities as scenes of tumult.

Genghis Khan was one of the first rulers who in 13th century enacted a law explicitly guaranteeing religious freedom to everyone and every religion.

=== Ancient Roman policy ===
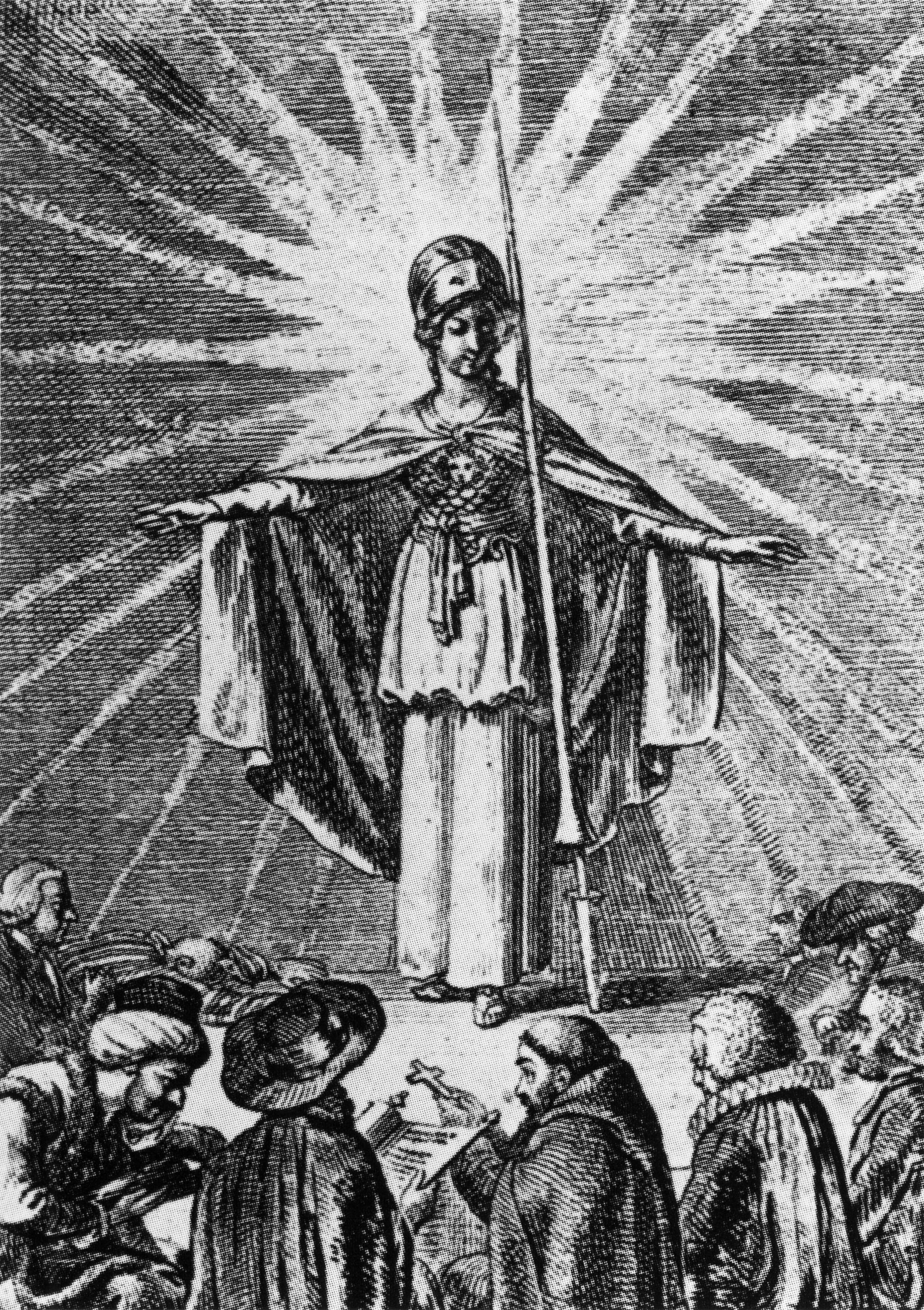
Roman goddess Minerva as a symbol of enlightened wisdom protects the believers of all religions (Daniel Chodowiecki, 1791)

The Romans tolerated most religions, including Judaism, and encouraged local subjects to continue worshipping their own gods. They did not, however, tolerate Christianity because of the Christian refusal to offer honours to the official cult of the emperor until it was legalised by the Roman emperor Galerius in 311. Holmes and Bickers note that as long as Christianity was treated as a part of Judaism, which was generally tolerated because of its antiquity and its practice of making offers on behalf of the emperor, it enjoyed the same freedom, but the Christian claim to religious exclusivity meant its followers found themselves subject to hostility.

The early Christian apologist Tertullian was the first-known writer to employ the term "freedom of religion" (libertas religionis), which appears in the 24th chapter of his Apologeticum. He expanded on the case for the tolerance of all religious views in his epistle to proconsul Scapula, in which he states

[I]t is a human right [(humanis ius)], a privilege of nature [(naturalis potestas)], that every man should worship according to his own convictions: one man's religion neither harms nor helps another man. It is assuredly no part of religion to compel religion—to which free-will and not force should lead us

The Edict of Milan guaranteed freedom of religion in the Roman Empire until the Edict of Thessalonica in 380, which outlawed all religions except Christianity.

=== India ===
Religious tolerance in India: A legacy of the past and a promise for the future

Ancient Jews fleeing from persecution in their homeland 2,500 years ago settled in modern-day India and never faced antisemitism. Freedom of religion edicts have been found written during Ashoka the Great's reign in the 3rd century BC. Freedom to practise, preach and propagate any religion is a constitutional right in Republic of India. Most major religious festivals of the main communities are included in the list of national holidays.

Many scholars and intellectuals believe that India's predominant religion, Hinduism, has long been a most tolerant religion. Rajni Kothari, founder of the Centre for the Study of Developing Societies has written, "[India] is a country built on the foundations of a civilisation that is fundamentally non-religious."

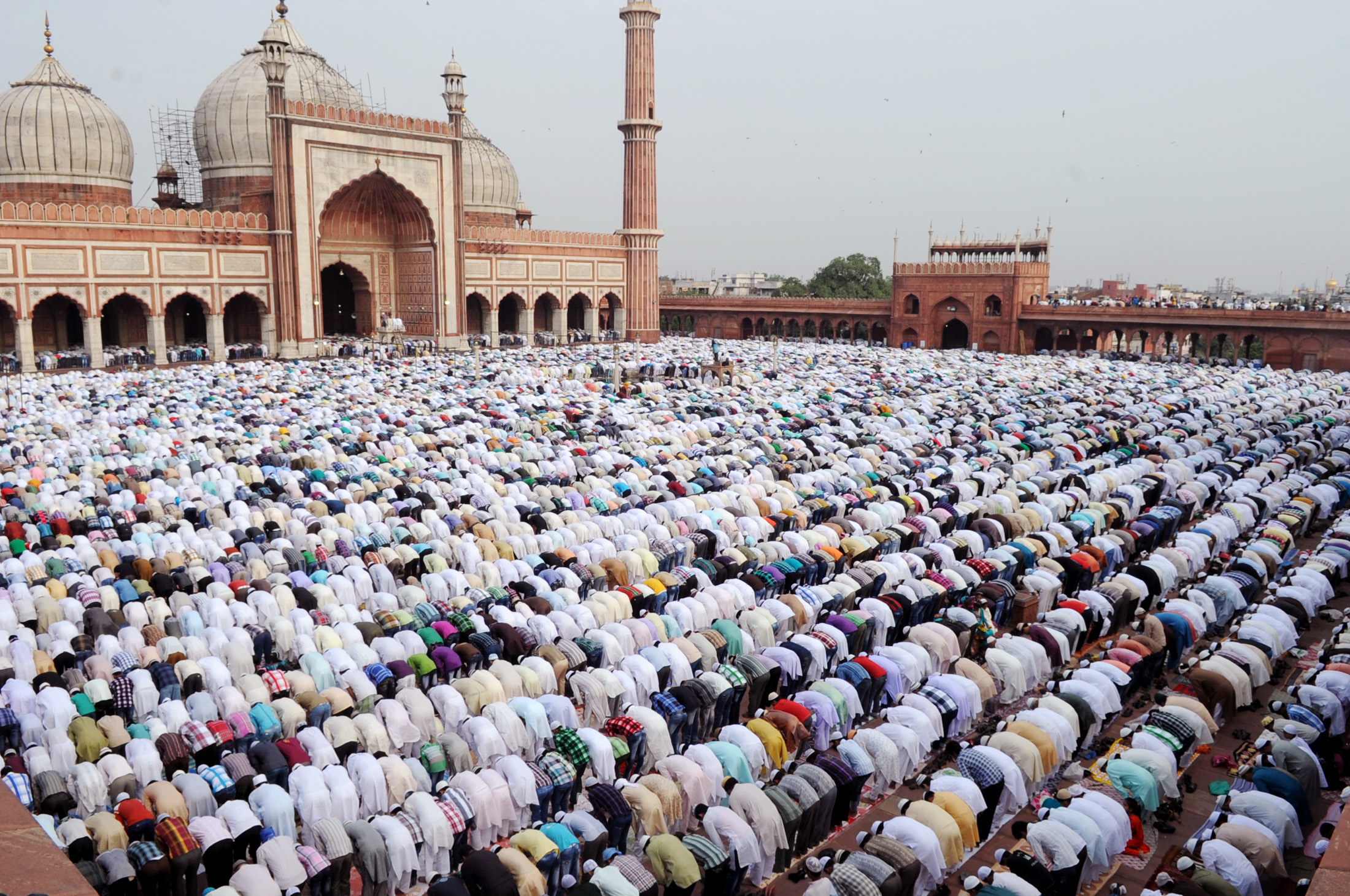
Muslims praying at the Jama Masjid in India, a majority-Hindu country

The Dalai Lama, the Tibetan leader in exile, said that religious tolerance of 'Aryabhoomi,' a reference to India found in the Mahabharata, has been in existence in this country from thousands of years. "Not only Hinduism, Jainism, Buddhism, Sikhism which are the native religions but also Christianity and Islam have flourished here. Religious tolerance is inherent in Indian tradition," the Dalai Lama said.

Freedom of religion in the Indian subcontinent is exemplified by the reign of King Piyadasi (304–232 BC) (Ashoka). One of King Ashoka's main concerns was to reform governmental institutes and exercise moral principles in his attempt to create a just and humane society. Later he promoted the principles of Buddhism, and the creation of a just, understanding and fair society was held as an important principle for many ancient rulers of this time in the East.

The importance of freedom of worship in India was encapsulated in an inscription of Ashoka:

King Piyadasi (Ashok) dear to the Gods, honours all sects, the ascetics (hermits) or those who dwell at home, he honours them with charity and in other ways. But the King, dear to the Gods, attributes less importance to this charity and these honours than to the vow of seeing the reign of virtues, which constitutes the essential part of them. For all these virtues there is a common source, modesty of speech. That is to say, one must not exalt one's creed discrediting all others, nor must one degrade these others without legitimate reasons. One must, on the contrary, render to other creeds the honour befitting them.

On the main Asian continent, the Mongols were tolerant of religions. People could worship as they wished freely and openly.

After the arrival of Europeans, Christians in their zeal to convert local as per belief in conversion as service of God, have also been seen to fall into frivolous methods since their arrival, though by and large there are hardly any reports of law and order disturbance from mobs with Christian beliefs, except perhaps in the north eastern region of India.

Freedom of religion in contemporary India is a fundamental right guaranteed under Article 25 of the nation's constitution. Accordingly, every citizen of India has a right to profess, practice and propagate their religions peacefully.

In September 2010, the Indian state of Kerala's State Election Commissioner announced that "Religious heads cannot issue calls to vote for members of a particular community or to defeat the nonbelievers". The Catholic Church comprising Latin, Syro-Malabar and Syro-Malankara rites used to give clear directions to the faithful on exercising their franchise during elections through pastoral letters issued by bishops or council of bishops. The pastoral letter issued by Kerala Catholic Bishops' Council (KCBC) on the eve of the poll urged the faithful to shun atheists.

=== Europe ===
==== Religious intolerance ====
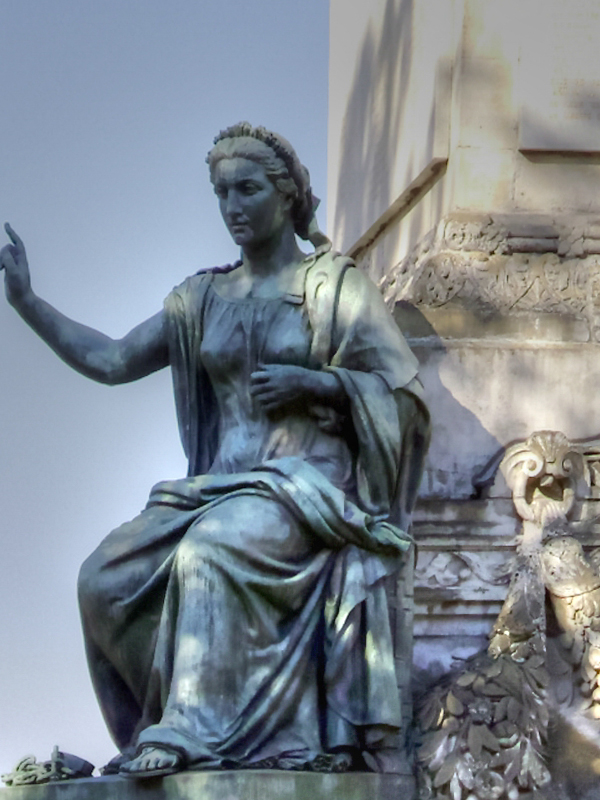
Nineteenth-century allegorical statue on the Congress Column in Brussels depicting religious freedom

Most Roman Catholic kingdoms kept a tight rein on religious expression throughout the Middle Ages. Jews were alternately tolerated and persecuted, the most notable examples of the latter being the expulsion of all Jews from Spain in 1492. Some of those who remained and converted were tried as heretics in the Inquisition for allegedly practicing Judaism in secret. Despite the persecution of Jews, they were the most tolerated non-Catholic faith in Europe.

However, the latter was in part a reaction to the growing movement that became the Reformation. As early as 1380, John Wycliffe in England denied transubstantiation and began his translation of the Bible into English. He was condemned in a papal bull in 1410, and all his books were burned.

In 1414, Jan Hus, a Bohemian preacher of reformation, was given a safe conduct by the Holy Roman Emperor to attend the Council of Constance. Not entirely trusting in his safety, he made his will before he left. His forebodings proved accurate, and he was burned at the stake on 6 July 1415. The council also decreed that Wycliffe's remains be disinterred and cast out. This decree was not carried out until 1429.

After the fall of the city of Granada, Spain, in 1492, the Muslim population was promised religious freedom by the Treaty of Granada, but that promise was short-lived. In 1501, Granada's Muslims were given an ultimatum to either convert to Christianity or to emigrate. The majority converted, but only superficially, continuing to dress and speak as they had before and to secretly practice Islam. The Moriscos (converts to Christianity) were ultimately expelled from Spain between 1609 (Castile) and 1614 (rest of Spain), by Philip III.

Martin Luther published his famous 95 Theses in Wittenberg on 31 October 1517. His major aim was theological, summed up in the three basic dogmas of Protestantism:

- The Bible only is infallible.
- Every Christian can interpret it.
- Human sins are so wrongful that no deed or merit, only God's grace, can lead to salvation.

In consequence, Luther hoped to stop the sale of indulgences and to reform the Church from within. In 1521, he was given the chance to recant at the Diet of Worms before Charles V, Holy Roman Emperor. After he refused to recant, he was declared heretic. Partly for his own protection, he was sequestered on the Wartburg in the possessions of Frederick III, Elector of Saxony, where he translated the New Testament into German. He was excommunicated by papal bull in 1521.

However, the movement continued to gain ground in his absence and spread to Switzerland. Huldrych Zwingli preached reform in Zürich from 1520 to 1523. He opposed the sale of indulgences, celibacy, pilgrimages, pictures, statues, relics, altars, and organs. This culminated in outright war between the Swiss cantons that accepted Protestantism and the Catholics. In 1531, the Catholics were victorious, and Zwingli was killed in battle. The Catholic cantons made peace with Zurich and Berne.

The defiance of papal authority proved contagious, and in 1533, when Henry VIII of England was excommunicated for his divorce and remarriage to Anne Boleyn, he promptly established a state church with bishops appointed by the crown. This was not without internal opposition, and Thomas More, who had been his Lord Chancellor, was executed in 1535 for opposition to Henry.

In 1535, the Swiss canton of Geneva became Protestant. In 1536, the Bernese imposed the reformation on the canton of Vaud by conquest. They sacked the cathedral in Lausanne and destroyed all its art and statuary. John Calvin, who had been active in Geneva was expelled in 1538 in a power struggle, but he was invited back in 1540.

The same kind of seesaw back and forth between Protestantism and Catholicism was evident in England when Mary I returned that country briefly to the Catholic fold in 1553 and persecuted Protestants. However, her half-sister, Elizabeth I was to restore the Church of England in 1558, this time permanently, and began to persecute Catholics again. The King James Bible commissioned by King James VI and I and published in 1611 proved a landmark for Protestant worship, with official Catholic forms of worship being banned.

In France, although peace was made between Protestants and Catholics at the Peace of Saint-Germain-en-Laye in 1570, persecution continued, most notably in the Massacre of Saint Bartholomew's Day on 24 August 1572, in which thousands of Protestants throughout France were killed. A few years before, at the "Michelade" of Nîmes in 1567, Protestants had massacred the local Catholic clergy.

==== Early steps and attempts in the way of tolerance ====
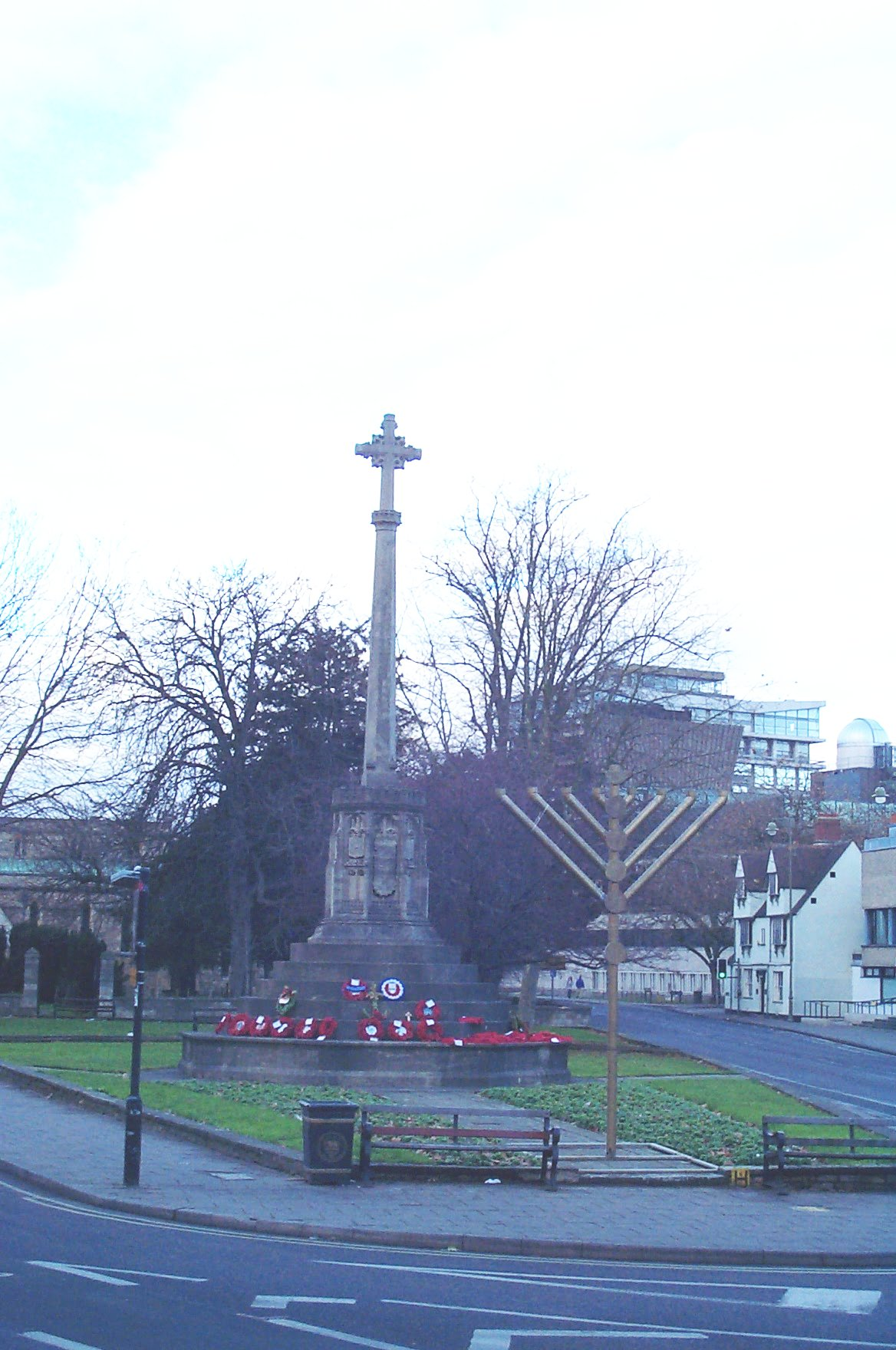
The cross of the war memorial and a menorah coexist in Oxford, Oxfordshire, England

The Norman Kingdom of Sicily under Roger II was characterized by its multi-ethnic nature and religious tolerance. Normans, Jews, Muslim Arabs, Byzantine Greeks, Lombards, and native Sicilians lived in harmony. Rather than exterminate the Muslims of Sicily, Roger II's grandson Emperor Frederick II of Hohenstaufen (1215–1250) allowed them to settle on the mainland and build mosques. Not least, he enlisted them in his – Christian – army and even into his personal bodyguards.

Kingdom of Bohemia (present-day Czech Republic) enjoyed religious freedom between 1436 and 1620 as a result of the Bohemian Reformation, and became one of the most liberal countries of the Christian world during that period of time. The so-called Basel Compacts of 1436 declared the freedom of religion and peace between Catholics and Utraquists. In 1609 Emperor Rudolf II granted Bohemia greater religious liberty with his Letter of Majesty. The privileged position of the Catholic Church in the Czech kingdom was firmly established after the Battle of White Mountain in 1620. Gradually freedom of religion in Bohemian lands came to an end and Protestants fled or were expelled from the country. A devout Catholic, Emperor Ferdinand II forcibly converted Austrian and Bohemian Protestants.

In the meantime, in Germany Philip Melanchthon drafted the Augsburg Confession as a common confession for the Lutherans and the free territories. It was presented to Charles V in 1530.

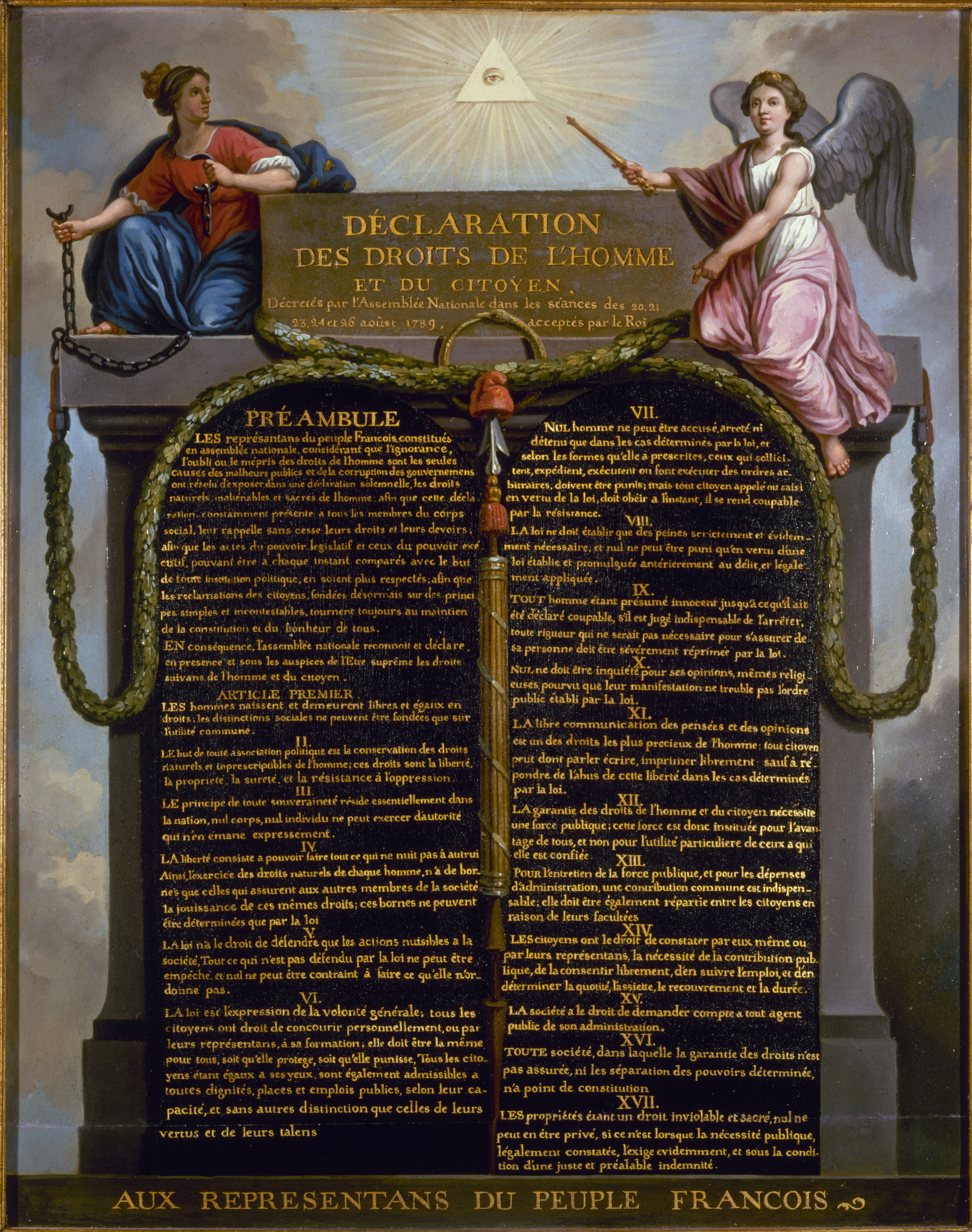
The French Declaration of the Rights of Man and of the Citizen (1789) guarantees freedom of religion, as long as religious activities do not infringe on public order in ways detrimental to society.

In the Holy Roman Empire, Charles V agreed to tolerate Lutheranism in 1555 at the Peace of Augsburg. Each state was to take the religion of its prince, but within those states, there was not necessarily religious tolerance. Citizens of other faiths could relocate to a more hospitable environment.

In France, from the 1550s, many attempts to reconcile Catholics and Protestants and to establish tolerance failed because the State was too weak to enforce them. It took the victory of prince Henry IV of France, who had converted into Protestantism, and his accession to the throne, to impose religious tolerance formalized in the Edict of Nantes in 1598. It would remain in force for over 80 years until its revocation in 1685 by Louis XIV. Intolerance remained the norm until Louis XVI, who signed the Edict of Versailles (1787), then the constitutional text of 24 December 1789, granting civilian rights to Protestants. The French Revolution then abolished state religion and the Declaration of the Rights of Man and of the Citizen (1789) guarantees freedom of religion, as long as religious activities do not infringe on public order in ways detrimental to society.

=== Early laws and legal guarantees for religious freedom ===
==== Principality of Transylvania ====
In 1558, the Hungarian Diet's Edict of Torda declared free practice of both Catholicism and Lutheranism. Calvinism, however, was prohibited. Calvinism was included among the accepted religions in 1564. Ten years after the first law, in 1568, the same Diet, under the chairmanship of King of Hungary, and Prince of Transylvania John Sigismund Zápolya (John II), following the teaching of Ferenc Dávid, the founder of the Unitarian Church of Transylvania, extended the freedom to all religions, declaring that "It is not allowed to anybody to intimidate anybody with captivity or expelling for his religion".

Act of Religious Tolerance and Freedom of Conscience:

His majesty, our Lord, in what manner he – together with his realm – legislated in the matter of religion at the previous Diets, in the same matter now, in this Diet, reaffirms that in every place the preachers shall preach and explain the Gospel each according to his understanding of it, and if the congregation like it, well. If not, no one shall compel them for their souls would not be satisfied, but they shall be permitted to keep a preacher whose teaching they approve. Therefore none of the superintendents or others shall abuse the preachers, no one shall be reviled for his religion by anyone, according to the previous statutes, and it is not permitted that anyone should threaten anyone else by imprisonment or by removal from his post for his teaching. For faith is the gift of God and this comes from hearing, which hearings is by the word of God.

— Diet at Torda, 1568: King John Sigismund

After hearing learned debate on the matter, King Sigismund ruled that society did not have the power to stifle religious expression. The lack of state religion was unique for centuries in Europe, and the Edict of Torda is considered as the first legal guarantee of religious freedom in Christian Europe.

Four religions (Catholicism, Lutheranism, Calvinism, Unitarianism) were named as accepted religions (religo recepta), having their representatives in the Transylvanian Diet, while the other religions, like the Orthodoxs, Sabbatarians and Anabaptists were tolerated churches (religio tolerata), which meant that they had no power in the law making and no veto rights in the Diet, but they were not persecuted in any way. Thanks to the Edict of Torda, from the last decades of the 16th century Transylvania was the only place in Europe, where so many religions could live together in harmony and without persecution.

This religious freedom ended however for some of the religions of Transylvania in 1638. After this year the Sabbatarians began to be persecuted and forced to convert to one of the accepted Christian religions of Transylvania.

==== Habsburg rule in Transylvania ====
The Unitarians (despite being one of the "accepted religions") started to be put under an ever-growing pressure, which culminated after the Habsburg conquest of Transylvania (1691), Also after the Habsburg occupation, the new Austrian masters forced in the middle of the 18th century the Hutterite Anabaptists (who found a safe haven in 1621 in Transylvania, after the persecution to which they were subjected in the Austrian provinces and Moravia) to convert to Catholicism or to migrate in another country, which finally the Anabaptists did, leaving Transylvania and Hungary for Wallachia, then from there to Russia, and finally in the United States.

==== Netherlands ====
In the Union of Utrecht of 1579, personal freedom of religion was declared in the struggle between the Northern Netherlands and Spain. The Union of Utrecht was an important step in the establishment of the Dutch Republic (from 1581 to 1795). Under Calvinist leadership, the Netherlands became one of the most tolerant countries in Europe. It granted asylum to persecuted religious minorities, such as the Huguenots, the Dissenters, and the Jews who had been expelled from Spain and Portugal. The establishment of a Jewish community in the Netherlands and New Amsterdam (present-day New York) during the Dutch Republic is an example of religious freedom. When New Amsterdam was surrendered to the English in 1664, freedom of religion was guaranteed in the Articles of Capitulation. It benefitted also the Jews who had landed on Manhattan Island in 1654, fleeing Portuguese persecution in Brazil.

==== England ====
After the Restoration, England's Parliament restored the Church of England's legally-enforced monopoly. Anyone who refused to take Anglican communion and swear certain oaths were banned from holding office by the Corporation Act of 1661 and the Test Acts of 1673 and 1678. The 1662 Act of Uniformity exiled priests and other clergymen who did not use the Book of Common Prayer.

John Locke's 1685 A Letter Concerning Toleration, was written against that background and as a counter to the reversal of the Edict of Nantes. He argued that the law should only concern itself with the protection of "civil interests", e.g. life, liberty, health, and property, while disagreeing with the proposition that churches possess any sort of coercive power. Locke constructed three main arguments against the use of force to enforce a "true religion":

- the care of souls has not been entrusted to the government or magistrate by god or by consent of the people;
- force produces only the appearance of conformity and cannot produce true internal belief;
- and even if force could in fact change belief, government officials are as liable to error as anyone else.

Locke, in the same letter argued against extending this toleration to atheists. He reasoned that atheists could not be bound by "promises, covenants, and oaths". He also did not extend this toleration to members of churches who could be seen as falling under foreign civil jurisdictions as a result of their membership.

While the 1689 Act of Toleration, is not enact Locke's principles, it exempted Trinitarian Protestants who took the allegiance and supremacy oaths found in the Restoration code, and allowed licensed meeting-houses, while leaving the Test and Corporation Acts ratified and excluding Catholics, non-trinitarians, and atheists. Historians treat the act as a grant of limited wiggle room under the established church, not the establishment of an equal civil capacity.

==== Poland ====
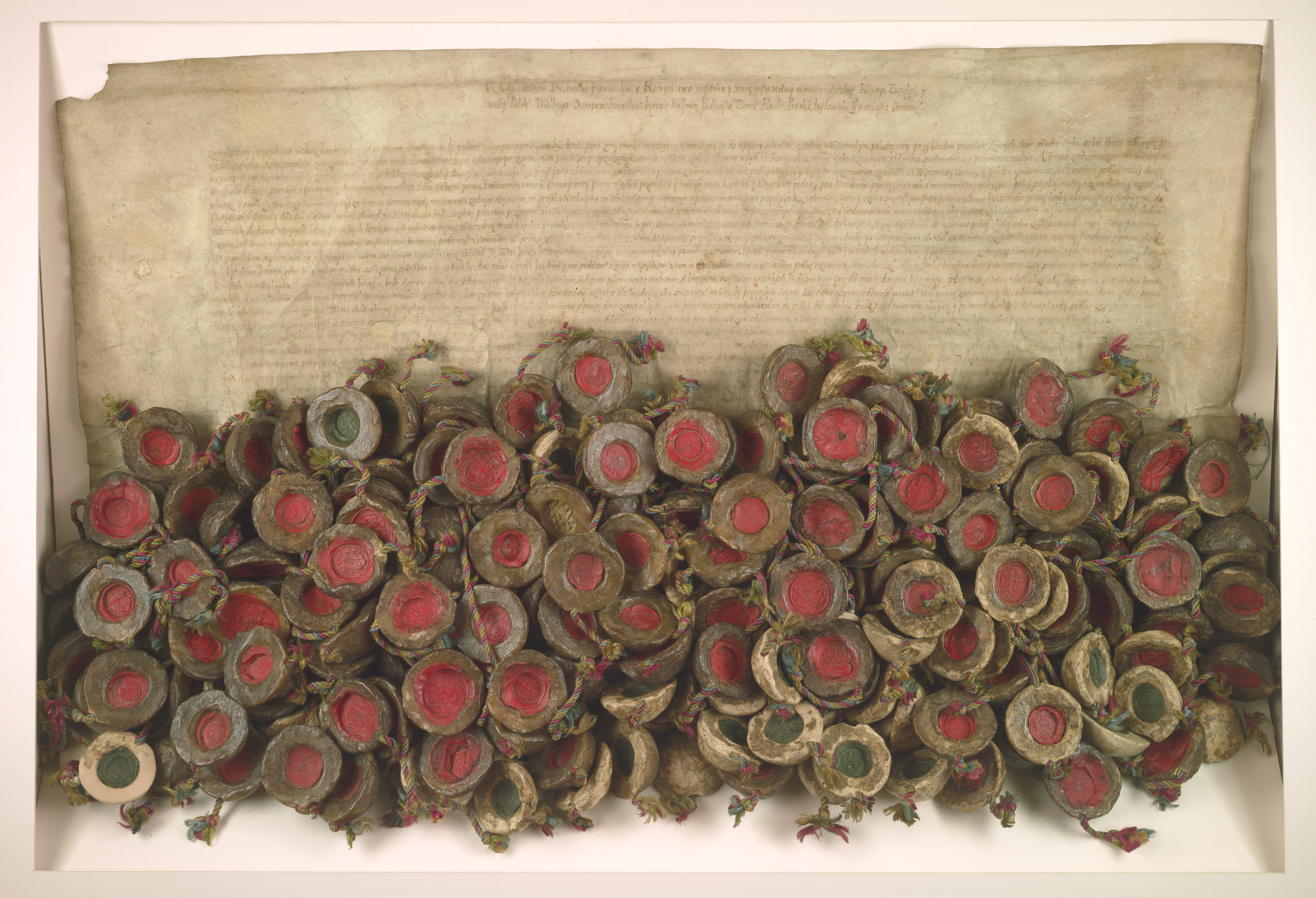
Original act of the Warsaw Confederation 1573. The beginning of religious freedom in the Polish–Lithuanian Commonwealth

The General Charter of Jewish Liberties known as the Statute of Kalisz was issued by the Duke of Greater Poland Boleslaus the Pious on 8 September 1264 in Kalisz. The statute served as the basis for the legal position of Jews in Poland and led to the creation of the Yiddish-speaking autonomous Jewish nation until 1795. The statute granted exclusive jurisdiction of Jewish courts over Jewish matters and established a separate tribunal for matters involving Christians and Jews. Additionally, it guaranteed personal liberties and safety for Jews including freedom of religion, travel, and trade. The statute was ratified by subsequent Polish Kings: Casimir III of Poland in 1334, Casimir IV of Poland in 1453 and Sigismund I of Poland in 1539. Poland freed Jews from direct royal authority, opening up enormous administrative and economic opportunities to them.

==== Polish–Lithuanian Commonwealth ====
The right to worship freely was a basic right given to all inhabitants of the future Polish–Lithuanian Commonwealth throughout the 15th and early 16th century, however, complete freedom of religion was officially recognized in 1573 during the Warsaw Confederation. Polish–Lithuanian Commonwealth kept religious freedom laws during an era when religious persecution was an everyday occurrence in the rest of Europe.

=== United States ===
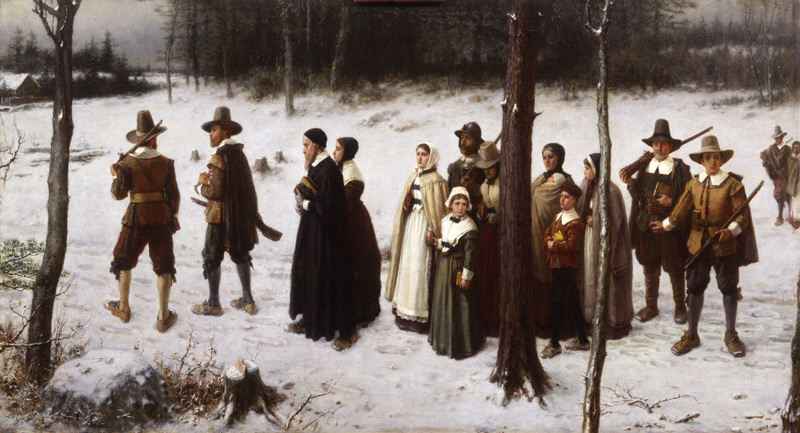
Pilgrims Going to Church, a 1867 depiction of Puritans in the New England Colonies, by George Henry Boughton

Most of the New England Colonies in British Colonial America were generally not tolerant of dissident forms of worship. For example, Roger Williams found it necessary to found a new colony in Rhode Island to escape persecution in the theocratically dominated colony of Massachusetts. The Puritans of the Massachusetts Bay Colony were the most active of the New England persecutors of Quakers, and the persecuting spirit was shared by Plymouth Colony and the colonies along the Connecticut River. Enforcing religious and intellectual homogeneity on the whole community, the civil and religious restrictions practiced by the Puritans of Massachusetts were more rigorous than those imposed on the Puritans in England, with various banishments applied to enforce conformity including the branding iron, the whipping post, the bilboes and the hangman's noose. In 1660, one of the most notable victims was an English Quaker Mary Dyer, who was hanged in Boston, Massachusetts for repeatedly defying a Puritan law banning Quakers from the colony. As one of the four executed Quakers known as the Boston martyrs, the hanging of Dyer on the Boston gallows marked the beginning of the end of the Puritan theocracy and New England independence from English rule, and in 1661 King Charles II explicitly forbade Massachusetts from executing anyone for professing Quakerism. Anti-Catholic sentiment appeared in New England with the first Pilgrim and Puritan settlers. In 1647, Massachusetts passed a law prohibiting any Jesuit Roman Catholic priests from entering territory under Puritan jurisdiction. Any suspected person who could not clear himself was to be banished from the colony; a second offense carried a death penalty. The Pilgrims of New England held radical Protestant disapproval of Christmas. Christmas observance was outlawed in Boston in 1659. The ban by the Puritans was revoked in 1681 by an English appointed governor, however, it was not until the mid-19th century that celebrating Christmas became common in the Boston region.

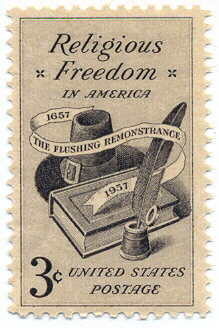
A 1957 U.S. postage stamp commemorating religious freedom and the 1657 Flushing Remonstrance which had lifted governor Peter Stuyvesant's ban on Quaker worship in New Netherland

Freedom of religion was first applied as a principle of government in the founding of the colony of Maryland, founded by the Catholic Lord Baltimore, in 1634. Fifteen years later (1649), the Maryland Toleration Act, drafted by Lord Baltimore, provided: "No person or persons...shall from henceforth be any way troubled, molested or discountenanced for or in respect of his or her religion nor in the free exercise thereof." The Act allowed freedom of worship for all Trinitarian Christians in Maryland, but sentenced to death anyone who denied the divinity of Jesus. The Maryland Toleration Act was repealed during the Cromwellian Era with the assistance of Protestant assemblymen and a new law barring Catholics from openly practicing their religion was passed. In 1657, the Catholic Lord Baltimore regained control after making a deal with the colony's Protestants, and in 1658 the Act was again passed by the colonial assembly. This time, it would last more than thirty years, until 1692 when, after Maryland's Protestant Revolution of 1689, freedom of religion was again rescinded. In addition, in 1704, an Act was passed "to prevent the growth of Popery in this Province", preventing Catholics from holding political office.

Rhode Island (1636), Connecticut (1636), New Jersey, and Pennsylvania (1682) – founded by Protestants Roger Williams, Thomas Hooker, and William Penn, respectively – combined the democratic form of government which had been developed by the Puritans and the Separatist Congregationalists in Massachusetts with religious freedom. These colonies became sanctuaries for persecuted religious minorities. Catholics and, later on, Jews also had full citizenship and free exercise of their religions. Williams, Hooker, Penn, and their friends were firmly convinced that freedom of conscience was the will of God. Williams gave the most profound argument: As faith is the free work of the Holy Spirit, it cannot be forced on a person. Therefore, strict separation of church and state has to be kept. Penn was involved in a case which had a profound effect on future American laws and those of England. In a classic case of jury nullification, the jury refused to convict Penn of preaching a Quaker sermon, which was illegal. Even though the jury was imprisoned for their acquittal, they stood by their decision and helped establish freedom of religion in the area.

Pennsylvania was the only colony that retained unlimited religious freedom until the foundation of the United States in 1776. It was the inseparable connection between democracy, religious freedom, and other forms of freedom which became the political and legal basis of the new nation. In particular, Baptists and Presbyterians demanded the disestablishment of state churches – Anglican and Congregationalist – and the protection of religious freedom.

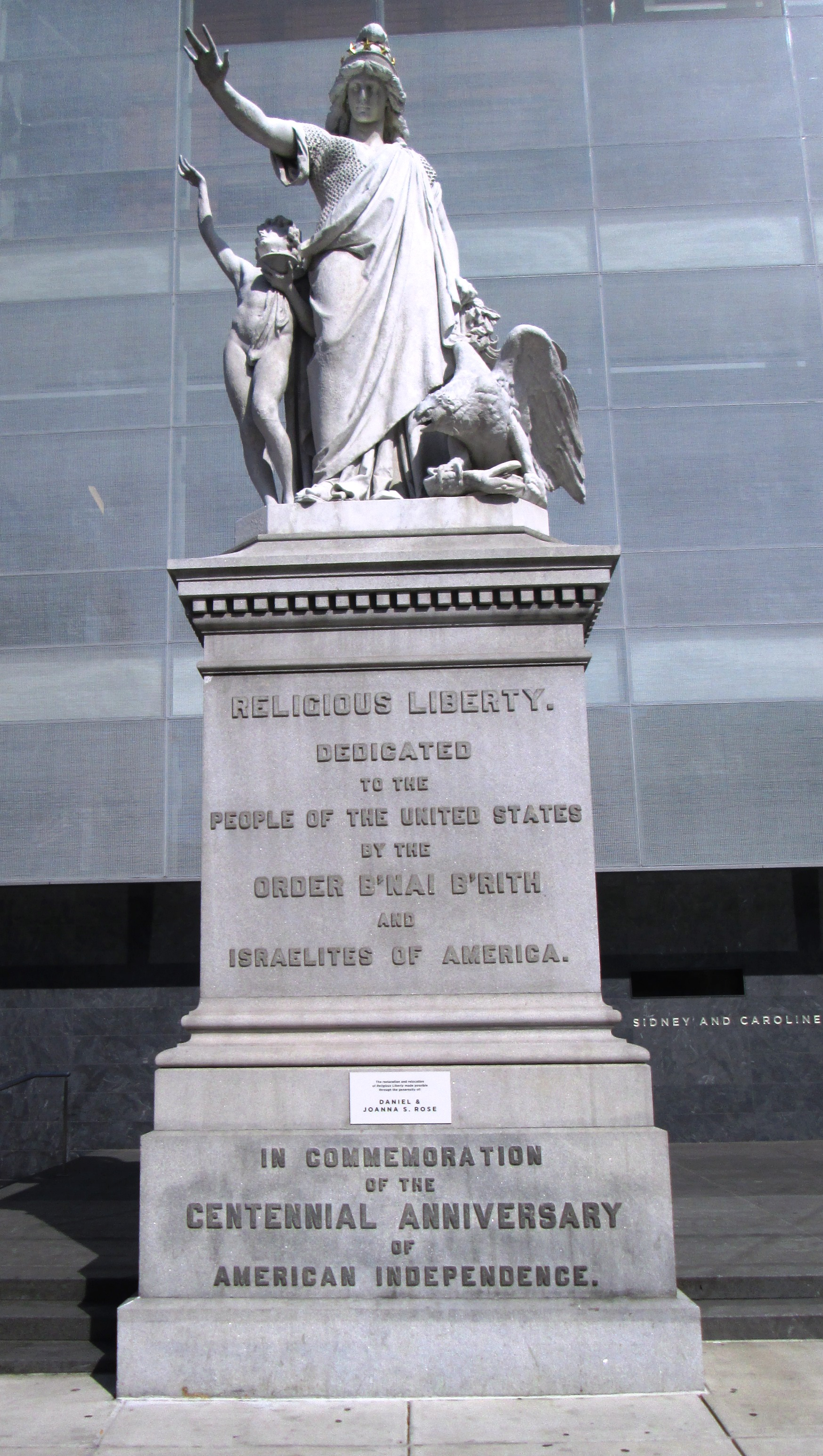
Religious Liberty, a statue by Moses Jacob Ezekiel commissioned for the 1876 Centennial Exposition and dedicated "to the people of the United States"

Reiterating Maryland's and the other colonies' earlier colonial legislation, the Virginia Statute for Religious Freedom, written in 1779 by Thomas Jefferson, proclaimed:

[N]o man shall be compelled to frequent or support any religious worship, place, or ministry whatsoever, nor shall be enforced, restrained, molested, or burthened in his body or goods, nor shall otherwise suffer, on account of his religious opinions or belief; but that all men shall be free to profess, and by argument to maintain, their opinions in matters of religion, and that the same shall in no wise diminish, enlarge, or affect their civil capacities.

Those sentiments also found expression in the First Amendment of the national constitution, part of the United States' Bill of Rights: "Congress shall make no law respecting an establishment of religion, or prohibiting the free exercise thereof...". The acknowledgement of religious freedom as the first right protected in the Bill of Rights points toward the American founders' understanding of the importance of religion to human, social, and political flourishing. The First Amendment makes clear that it sought to protect "the free exercise" of religion, or what might be called "free exercise equality."

The United States formally considers religious freedom in its foreign relations. The International Religious Freedom Act of 1998 established the United States Commission on International Religious Freedom which investigates the records of over 200 other nations with respect to religious freedom, and makes recommendations to submit nations with egregious records to ongoing scrutiny and possible economic sanctions. Many human rights organizations have urged the United States to be still more vigorous in imposing sanctions on countries that do not permit or tolerate religious freedom.

=== Canada ===
Freedom of religion in Canada is a constitutionally protected right, allowing believers the freedom to assemble and worship without limitation or interference. Canadian law goes further, requiring that private citizens and companies provide reasonable accommodation to those, for example, with strong religious beliefs. The Canadian Human Rights Act allows an exception to reasonable accommodation with respect to religious dress, such as a Sikh turban, when there is a bona fide occupational requirement, such as a workplace requiring a hard hat. In 2017 the Santo Daime Church Céu do Montréal received religious exemption to use Ayahuasca as a sacrament in their rituals.

=== Children's rights ===
The law in Germany includes the concept of "religious maturity" (Religiöse Mündigkeit) with a minimum age for minors to follow their own religious beliefs even if their parents don't share those or don't approve. Children 14 and older have the unrestricted right to enter or exit any religious community. Children 12 and older cannot be compelled to change to a different belief. Children 10 and older have to be heard before their parents change their religious upbringing to a different belief. There are similar laws in Austria and in Switzerland.

=== International ===
The Universal Declaration of Human Rights declares that:

Everyone has the right to freedom of thought, conscience and religion; this right includes freedom to change his religion or belief, and freedom, either alone or in community with others and in public or private, to manifest his religion or belief in teaching, practice, worship and observance.

— Universal Declaration of Human Rights, Article 18, United Nations, 1948

On 25 November 1981, the United Nations General Assembly passed the Declaration on the Elimination of All Forms of Intolerance and of Discrimination Based on Religion or Belief. This declaration recognizes freedom of religion as a fundamental human right in accordance with several other instruments of international law.

However, the most substantial binding legal instruments that guarantee the right to freedom of religion that was passed by the international community is the Convention on the Rights of the Child which states in its Article 14: "States Parties shall respect the right of the child to freedom of thought, conscience and religion. – States Parties shall respect the rights and duties of the parents and, when applicable, legal guardians, to provide direction to the child in the exercise of his or her right in a manner consistent with the evolving capacities of the child. – Freedom to manifest one's religion or beliefs may be subject only to such limitations as are prescribed by law and are necessary to protect public safety, order, health or morals, or the fundamental rights and freedoms of others."

There exists a United Nations Special Rapporteur on Freedom of Religion or Belief.

== Right to change religion ==
Apostasy penalties in 2020 by country

Part of religious freedom is the right of an individual to change or abandon his or her own religion. Religious conversion is criminalized as apostasy in some countries.

In 2008, Christian Solidarity Worldwide, a Christian human rights non-governmental organisation which specializes in religious freedom, launched an in-depth report on the human rights abuses faced by individuals who leave Islam for another religion. The report is the product of a year long research project in six countries. It calls on Muslim nations, the international community, the UN and the international media to resolutely address the serious violations of human rights suffered by apostates.

== Right to proselytize ==
Part of the freedom of religion is the right to proselytize, seeking to convince others to convert to a religion. Pope Paul VI referred to the Catholic Church's "evangelical right" to practice and to minister its faith during the Second Vatican Council.

Some debates have centered around restricting certain kinds of missionary activity by religions. Proselytism by foreign citizens has been restricted as a foreign intervention in line with Article 18 of International Covenant on Civil and Political Rights. Many Islamic states, and others such as China, severely restrict missionary activities of other religions. Greece, among European countries, has generally looked unfavorably on missionary activities of denominations others than the majority church and proselytizing is constitutionally prohibited.

A critique of the freedom to propagate religion has come from non-Abrahamic traditions such as the African and Indian. African scholar Makau Mutua criticizes religious evangelism on the ground of cultural annihilation by what he calls "proselytizing universalist faiths" (Chapter 28: Proselytism and Cultural Integrity, p. 652):

...the (human) rights regime incorrectly assumes a level playing field by requiring that African religions compete in the marketplace of ideas. The rights corpus not only forcibly imposes on African religions the obligation to compete – a task for which as nonproselytizing, noncompetitive creeds they are not historically fashioned – but also protects the evangelizing religions in their march towards universalization ... it seems inconceivable that the human rights regime would have intended to protect the right of certain religions to destroy others.

Some Indian scholars have similarly argued that the right to propagate religion is not culturally or religiously neutral. In Sri Lanka, there have been debates regarding a bill on religious freedom that seeks to protect indigenous religious traditions from certain kinds of missionary activities. Debates have also occurred in various states of India regarding similar laws, particularly those that restrict conversions using force, fraud or allurement.

== Freedom from religion ==
A core element of freedom of religion is the freedom not to practice religion. This is often called Freedom from religion. Various charities work to promote this right including the ACLU, and American United. The Satanic Temple is famous and infamous for their official unbaptism rituals. There is also a group named after the concept, the Freedom From Religion Foundation. A similar concept is irreligious organizations.

The term for disaffiliation from, abandonment of, or renunciation of a religion by a person is apostasy. Many religious groups and some states punish apostates; this may be the official policy of a particular religious group or it may simply be the voluntary action of its members. Such punishments may include shunning, excommunication, verbal abuse, physical violence, or even execution.

== Contemporary debates ==
=== Theistic, non-theistic and atheistic beliefs ===
In 1993, the UN's human rights committee declared that article 18 of the International Covenant on Civil and Political Rights "protects theistic, non-theistic and atheistic beliefs, as well as the right not to profess any religion or belief." The committee further stated that "the freedom to have or to adopt a religion or belief necessarily entails the freedom to choose a religion or belief, including the right to replace one's current religion or belief with another or to adopt atheistic views." Signatories to the convention are barred from "the use of threat of physical force or penal sanctions to compel believers or non-believers" to recant their beliefs or convert. Despite this, minority religions still are persecuted in many parts of the world.

=== Non-religious people ===
In 2012, the organizations American Humanist Association, Center for Inquiry, Humanists International, Richard Dawkins Foundation for Reason and Science and Secular Coalition for America worked together on a joint report: the 2012 Report on Discrimination Against Atheists, Humanists and the Non-Religious. In December, on Human Rights Day, Humanists International launched a new edition for an international audience: Freedom of Thought 2012: A Global Report on Discrimination against Humanists, Atheists and the Non-Religious. It is now called The Freedom of Thought Report and examines every country in the world for its record on upholding the rights and equality for non-religious people.

=== Secular liberalism ===
The French philosopher Voltaire noted in his book on English society, Letters on the English (1733), that freedom of religion in a diverse society was deeply important to maintaining peace in that country. It was also important to understand why England at that time was more prosperous in comparison to the country's less religiously tolerant European neighbours.

Take a view of the Royal Exchange in London, a place more venerable than many courts of justice, where the representatives of all nations meet for the benefit of mankind. There the Jew, the Mahometan [Muslim], and the Christian transact together, as though they all professed the same religion, and give the name of infidel to none but bankrupts. There the Presbyterian confides in the Anabaptist, and the Churchman depends on the Quaker's word. If one religion only were allowed in England, the Government would very possibly become arbitrary; if there were but two, the people would cut one another’s throats; but as there are such a multitude, they all live happy and in peace.

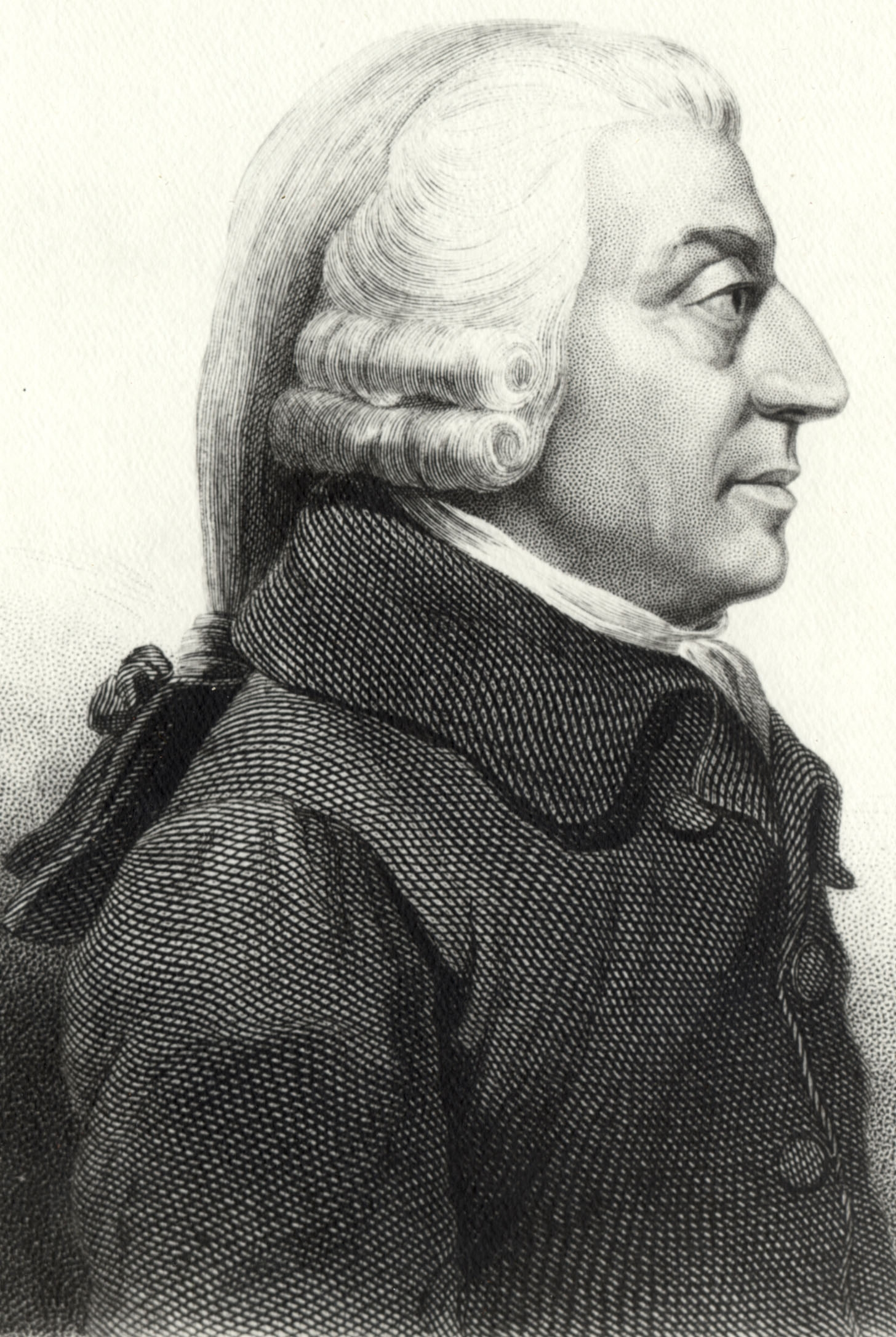
Adam Smith argued in favour of freedom of religion.

Adam Smith, in his book The Wealth of Nations (using an argument first put forward by his friend and contemporary David Hume), states that in the long run it is in the best interests of society as a whole and the civil magistrate (government) in particular to allow people to freely choose their own religion, as it helps prevent civil unrest and reduces intolerance. So long as there are enough religions and/or religious sects operating freely in a society then they are all compelled to moderate their more controversial and violent teachings, so as to be more appealing to more people and so have an easier time attracting new converts. It is this free competition amongst religious sects for converts that ensures stability and tranquillity in the long run.

Smith also points out that laws that prevent religious freedom and seek to preserve the power and belief in a particular religion will, in the long run, only serve to weaken and corrupt that religion, as its leaders and preachers become complacent, disconnected and unpractised in their ability to seek and win over new converts:

The interested and active zeal of religious teachers can be dangerous and troublesome only where there is either but one sect tolerated in the society, or where the whole of a large society is divided into two or three great sects; the teachers of each acting by concert, and under a regular discipline and subordination. But that zeal must be altogether innocent, where the society is divided into two or three hundred, or, perhaps, into as many thousand small sects, of which no one could be considerable enough to disturb the public tranquillity. The teachers of each sect, seeing themselves surrounded on all sides with more adversaries than friends, would be obliged to learn that candour and moderation which are so seldom to be found among the teachers of those great sects.

=== Secular law ===
Religious practice may also conflict with secular law, creating debates on religious freedom. For instance, even though polygamy is permitted in Islam, it is prohibited in secular law in many countries. This raises the question of whether prohibiting the practice infringes on the beliefs of certain Muslims. The US and India, both constitutionally secular nations, have taken two views of this. In India, polygamy is permitted, but only for Muslims, under Muslim Personal Law. In the US, polygamy is prohibited for all. This was a major source of conflict between the US government and The Church of Jesus Christ of Latter-day Saints until the Church amended its position on practicing polygamy.

Similar issues have also arisen in the context of the religious use of psychedelic substances by Native American tribes in the United States, such as by the Native American Church. Other examples of religious groups using entheogens are the União do Vegetal and Santo Daime.

In 1955, Chief Justice of California Roger J. Traynor neatly summarized the American position on how freedom of religion cannot imply freedom from law: "Although freedom of conscience and the freedom to believe are absolute, the freedom to act is not." But with respect to the religious use of animals within secular law and those acts, the US Supreme Court decision in the case of the Church of Lukumi Babalu Aye v. City of Hialeah in 1993 upheld the right of Santeria adherents to practice ritual animal sacrifice, with Justice Anthony Kennedy stating in the decision: "religious beliefs need not be acceptable, logical, consistent or comprehensible to others in order to merit First Amendment protection" (quoted by Justice Kennedy from the opinion by Justice Burger in Thomas v. Review Board of the Indiana Employment Security Division 450 U.S. 707 (1981)).

In 1962, the case of Engel v. Vitale went to court over the violation of the Establishment Clause of the First Amendment resulting from a mandatory nondenominational prayer in New York public schools. The Supreme Court ruled in opposition to the state.

In 1963, the Supreme Court ruled on the case of Abington School District v. Schempp. Edward Schempp sued the school district in Abington over the Pennsylvania law which required students to hear and sometimes read portions of the bible for their daily education. The court ruled in favor of Schempp and the Pennsylvania law was overturned.

In 1968, the Supreme Court ruled on the case of Epperson v. Arkansas. Susan Epperson, a high school teacher in Arkansas sued over a violation of religious freedom. The state had a law banning the teaching of evolution and the school Epperson worked for had provided curriculum which contained evolutionary theory. Epperson had to choose between violating the law or losing her job. The Supreme Court ruled to overturn the Arkansas law because it was unconstitutional.

Opinion polls show the median voters in some countries support some restrictions of the freedom of religion.

=== Religious exemptions ===
In court cases, religious adherents have argued that they need religious exemptions from laws requiring equal treatment of LGBT people to avoid being complicit in "the sinful behaviour" of LGBT people. Moreover, other Christians argue that LGBT rights must be entirely removed from law to preserve the religious liberty of conservative Christians. As pointed out at the United Nations Human Rights Council in the 2023 formal report of the United Nations Independent Expert on protection against violence and discrimination based on sexual orientation and gender identity on the basis of the explanation in a 2020 article by human rights expert Dag Øistein Endsjø, adherents of denominations and belief systems who embrace LGBT-equality "can claim that anti-LGBT manifestations of religion (such as criminalization and discrimination) not only impinge upon the right of LGBT people to be free from violence and discrimination based on sexual orientation and gender identity (SOGI), but also violate the denominations' own rights of freedom of religion".

Leaders of the Christian right in the United States, United Kingdom, and other nations frame their opposition to LGBT rights and reproductive freedom as a defence of religious liberty. The Catholic Church does not believe it unjustly discriminates against anyone, but justly discriminates against sin, by obeying God.

In 2015, Kim Davis, a Kentucky county clerk, refused to abide by the Supreme Court decision in Obergefell v. Hodges legalising same-sex marriage in the United States. When she refused to issue marriage licences, she became embroiled in the Miller v. Davis lawsuit. Her actions caused attorney and author Roberta Kaplan to claim that "Kim Davis is the clearest example of someone who wants to use a religious liberty argument to discriminate." Davis was briefly jailed and Kentucky court ordered her to pay the same-sex couple $100,000 in damages.

=== Judaism ===
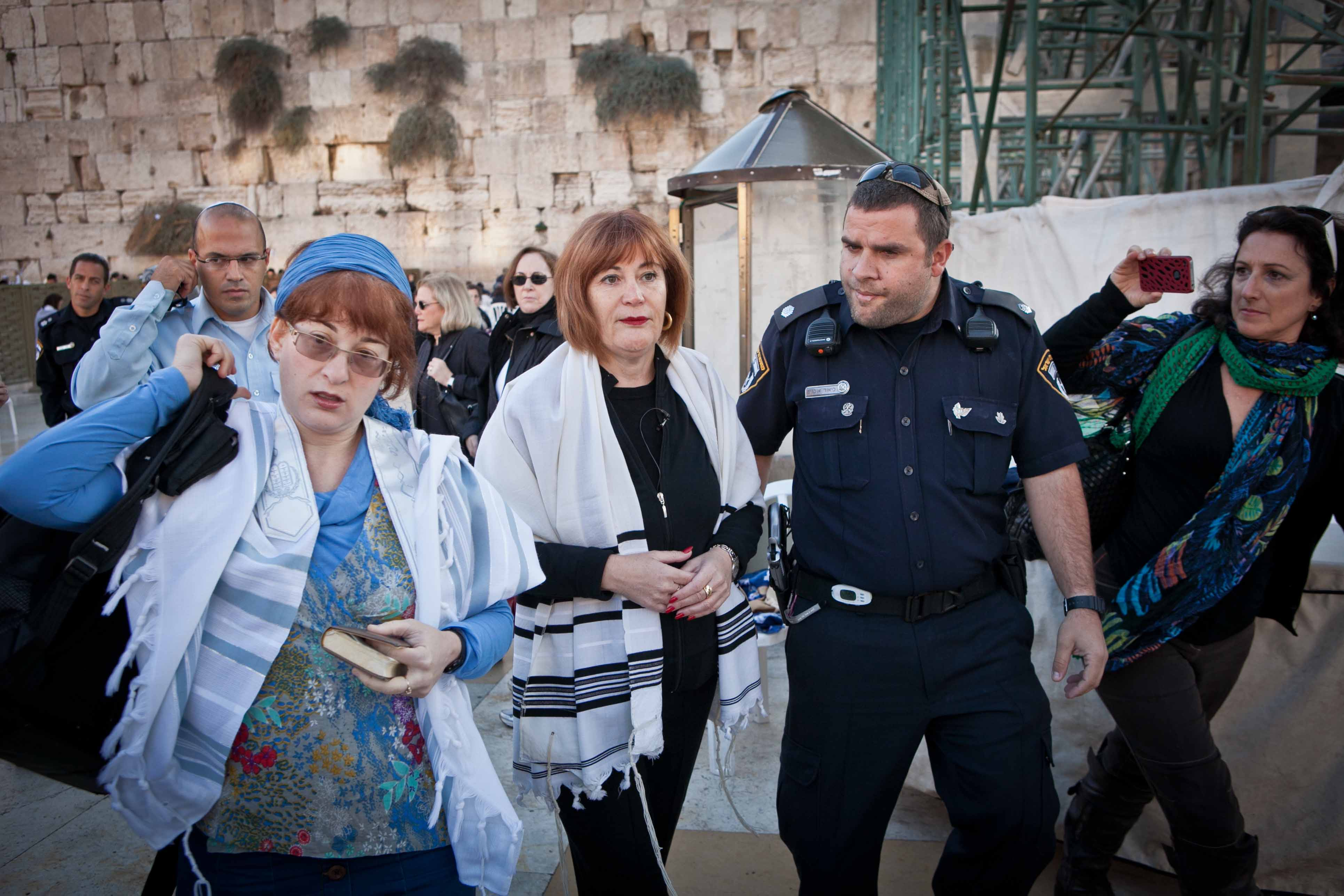
Women detained at Western Wall for wearing prayer shawls; photo from Women of the Wall

Judaism includes multiple streams, such as Orthodox, Reform Judaism, Conservative Judaism, Reconstructionist Judaism, Jewish Renewal and Humanistic Judaism. However, Judaism also exists in many forms as a civilization, possessing characteristics known as peoplehood, rather than strictly as a religion. In the Torah, Jews are forbidden to practice idolatry and are commanded to root out pagan and idolatrous practices within their midst, including killing idolaters who sacrifice children to their gods or engage in immoral activities. However, these laws are not adhered to anymore as Jews have usually lived among multi-religious communities.

After the conquest of the Kingdoms of Israel and Judea by the Roman Empire, a Jewish state did not exist until 1948 with the establishment of the State of Israel. For over 1500 years Jewish people lived under pagan, Christian, Muslim, etc. rule. As such Jewish people in some of these states faced persecution. From the pogroms in Europe during the Middle Ages to the establishment of segregated Jewish ghettos during World War II. In the Middle East, Jews were categorised as dhimmi, and non-Muslims were permitted to live within a Muslim state. Even though given rights within a Muslim state, a dhimmi is still not equal to a Muslim within Muslim society.

The State of Israel was established as a Jewish and democratic state after World War II. While the Israeli Declaration of Independence stresses religious freedom as a fundamental principle, in practice, most of Israel's governments have depended on ultra-Orthodox parties and have instituted legal barriers that applied to all Jews, regardless of whether they practised Orthodox Judaism. However, as a nation-state, Israel is very open towards other religions and religious practices, including a public Muslim call to prayer chants and Christian prayer bells ringing in Jerusalem. Israel has been evaluated in research by the Pew organization as having "high" government restrictions on religion. The government recognizes only Orthodox Judaism in certain matters of personal status, and marriages can only be performed by religious authorities. The government provides the greatest funding to Orthodox Judaism, even though adherents represent a minority of citizens. Jewish women, including Anat Hoffman, have been arrested at the Western Wall for praying and singing while wearing religious garments the Orthodox feel should be reserved for men. Women of the Wall have organized to promote religious freedom at the Wall. In November 2014, a group of 60 non-Orthodox rabbinical students were told they would not be allowed to pray in the Knesset synagogue because it is reserved for Orthodox. Rabbi Joel Levy, director of the Conservative Yeshiva in Jerusalem, said that he had submitted the request on behalf of the students and saw their shock when the request was denied. He noted: "Paradoxically, this decision served as an appropriate end to our conversation about religion and state in Israel." MK Dov Lipman expressed the concern that many Knesset workers are unfamiliar with non-Orthodox and American practices and would view "an egalitarian service in the synagogue as an affront." The non-Orthodox forms of Jewish practice function independently in Israel, except for these issues of praying at the Western Wall.

A January 2022 report by IMPACT-se, an Israeli non-profit, detailed the amount of religious tolerance impressed on students through the education system in the United Arab Emirates. The "Jews as a Religious Community" section of the report starts with the UAE curriculum being cited as a tolerant one and one instilling a "generally positive attitude toward other non-Muslims". However, besides the positive examples aimed at maintaining peace between the two nations, the report also highlights the negative portrayal of Jews in the UAE, citing a hadith passage that preaches believers to not be like the Jews, as they may be unclean or dirty. An Islamic educational text further described punishing the Bani Qurayza Jews for purportedly abusing their commitment to supporting Muhammad. The textbooks also seem to have missed mentioning Israel in their maps or educating the children about the Jewish state's history, i.e. the event of Holocaust despite normalizing ties with the Jewish state.

=== Christianity ===
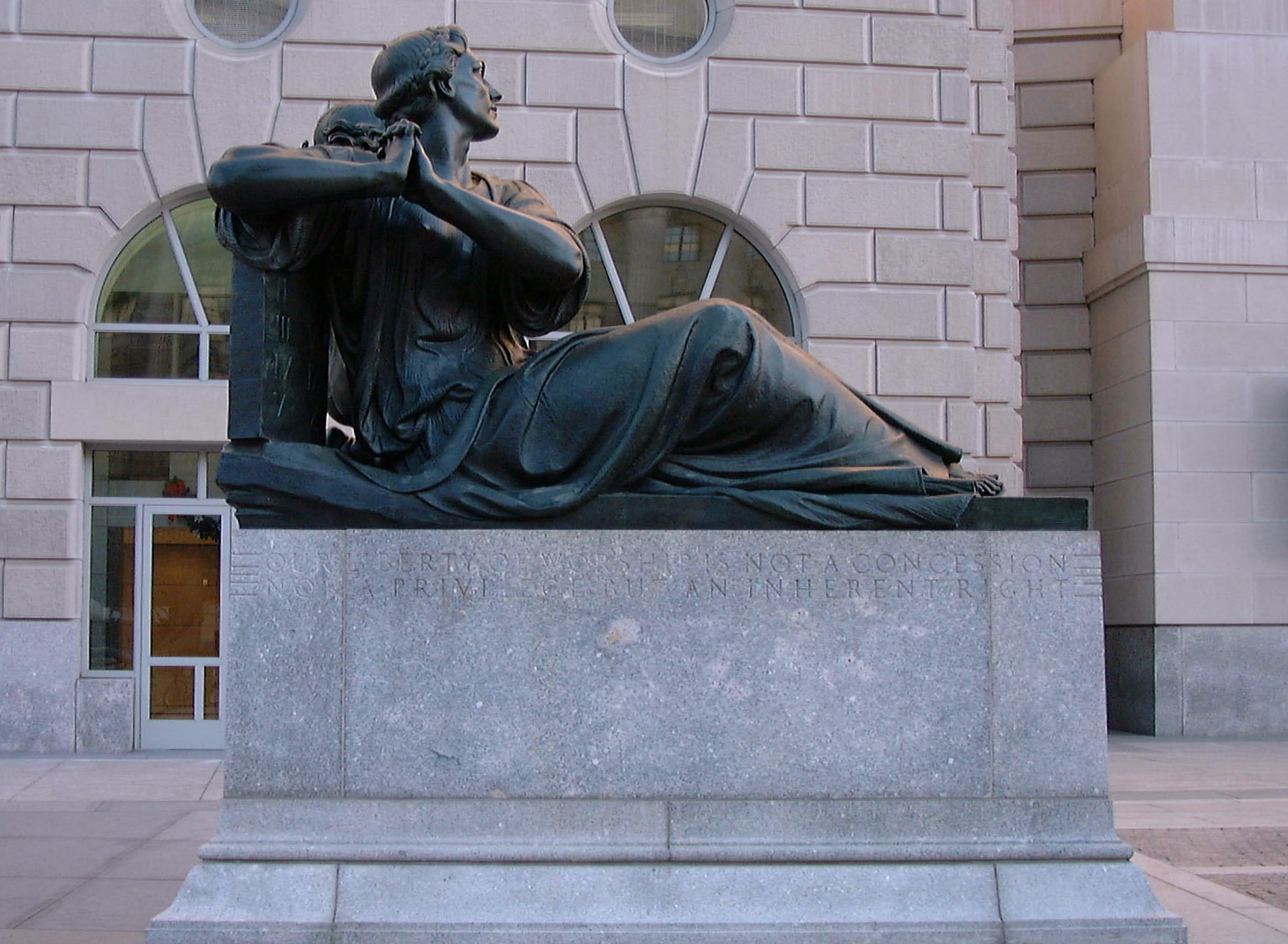
Part of the Oscar Straus Memorial in Washington, D.C. honoring the right to worship

Some Orthodox Christians, especially those living in democratic countries, support religious freedom for all, as evidenced by the position of the Ecumenical Patriarchate. Many Protestant Christian churches, including some Baptists, Churches of Christ, Seventh-day Adventist Church and main line churches have a commitment to religious freedoms. The Church of Jesus Christ of Latter-day Saints also affirms religious freedom.

However others, such as African scholar Makau Mutua, have argued that Christian insistence on the propagation of their faith to native cultures as an element of religious freedom has resulted in a corresponding denial of religious freedom to native traditions and led to their destruction. As he states in the book produced by the Oslo Coalition on Freedom of Religion or Belief, "Imperial religions have necessarily violated individual conscience and the communal expressions of Africans and their communities by subverting African religions."

In their book Breaking India, Hindutva ideologue Rajiv Malhotra and Aravindan Neelakandan discussed the "US Protestant Church" funding activities in India, with the book arguing that the funds collected were being used not so much for the purposes indicated to sponsors, but for indoctrination and conversion activities. They suggest that India is the prime target of a huge enterprise – a "network" of organizations, individuals, and churches – that, they argue, seem intensely devoted to the task of creating a separatist identity, history, and even religion for the vulnerable sections of India. They suggest that this nexus of players includes not only church groups, government bodies, and related organizations, but also private think tanks and academics.

Joel Spring has written about the Christianization of the Roman Empire:

Christianity added new impetus to the expansion of empire. Increasing the arrogance of the imperial project, Christians insisted that the Gospels and the Church were the only valid sources of religious beliefs. Imperialists could claim that they were both civilizing the world and spreading the true religion. By the 5th century, Christianity was thought of as co-extensive with the Imperium romanum. This meant that to be human, as opposed to being a natural slave, was to be "civilized" and Christian. Historian Anthony Pagden argues, "just as the civitas; had now become coterminous with Christianity, so to be human – to be, that is, one who was 'civil', and who was able to interpret correctly the law of nature – one had now also to be Christian." After the fifteenth century, most Western colonialists rationalized the spread of empire with the belief that they were saving a barbaric and pagan world by spreading Christian civilization.

==== Catholicism ====
Prior to the Second Vatican Council, the Catholic Church persecuted other religions. European Catholics, especially during the Inquisition and Crusades in the middle ages, killed Jews, Muslims, pagans, and Christians of different denominations and destroyed non-Christian and non-Catholic Christian religious art, books, and places of worship. In the colonial era of the United States, American Catholics forced Native Americans to convert to Catholicism and destroyed their religious art and places of worship. In 1864, Pope Pius IX had written a document called the Syllabus of Errors, which - made up of phrases and paraphrases from earlier papal documents, along with index references to them, and presented as a list of "condemned propositions" - condemned belief in universal religious freedom, claiming that non-Catholics do not have the right to practice their own religions and types of worship. In 1892, the church agreed with Thomas Aquinas on his policy of religious tolerance. In 2000, Pope John Paul II apologized on behalf of the church for its past sins, making special mention of religious persecution.

According to the Vatican II document on religious freedom, Dignitatis Humanae, "the human person has a right to religious freedom", which is described as "immunity from coercion in civil society". This principle of religious freedom "leaves untouched traditional Catholic doctrine on the moral duty of men and societies toward the true religion." In addition, this right "is to be recognized in the constitutional law whereby society is governed and thus it is to become a civil right." According to Dignitatis Humanae and the Catechism of the Catholic Church, every religion has the right to exist and to be publicly and privately practiced (including the right to be spread and to make converts), no religion must be denied the right to worship according to its own beliefs and practices, every person and group has the right to be religious or nonreligious and to change from one to the other, no person or group must be forced to be good but their right to conscience must be respected, every person and group has the right to its own culture and art, no religion must be used for sin nor any sin committed in the name of God or religion, and every religion and adherent must be treated as humanely as every other group and person in the world (especially when one religion is predominate or given special civil recognition). The catechism explains that, as the one true religion founded by the one true God, the Catholic Church has the right and duty to protect every individual's individual right to religious liberty. While the church believes idolatry is a sin, the church does not believe idolatry should be made illegal, since the criminalization of all or even most sins is the sin of coercion. Regarding the church's past sins, the catechism condemns Jewish deicide and makes reference to ecclesiastical torture and capital punishment.

=== Islam ===
Conversion to Islam is simple and according to Al-Baqara 256 "there is no compulsion in religion".^{[Quran 2:256]} Certain Muslim-majority countries are known for their restrictions on religious freedom, highly favoring Muslim citizens over non-Muslim citizens. Other countries having the same restrictive laws tend to be more liberal when imposing them. Even other Muslim-majority countries are secular and thus do not regulate religious belief.

In Iran, the constitution recognizes four religions whose status is formally protected: Zoroastrianism, Judaism, Christianity, and Islam. The constitution, however, also set the groundwork for the institutionalized persecution of Baháʼís, who have been subjected to arrests, beatings, executions, confiscation and destruction of property, and the denial of civil rights and liberties, and the denial of access to higher education. There is no freedom of conscience in Iran, as converting from Islam to any other religion is forbidden.

In Egypt, a 16 December 2006 judgment of the Supreme Constitutional Court of Egypt created a clear demarcation between recognized religions – Islam, Christianity and Judaism – and all other religious beliefs; no other religious affiliation is officially admissible. The ruling leaves members of other religious communities, including Baháʼís, without the ability to obtain the necessary government documents to have rights in their country, essentially denying them of all rights of citizenship. They cannot obtain ID cards, birth certificates, death certificates, marriage or divorce certificates, and passports; they also cannot be employed, educated, treated in public hospitals or vote, among other things. See Egyptian identification card controversy.

==== Apostasy in Islam ====
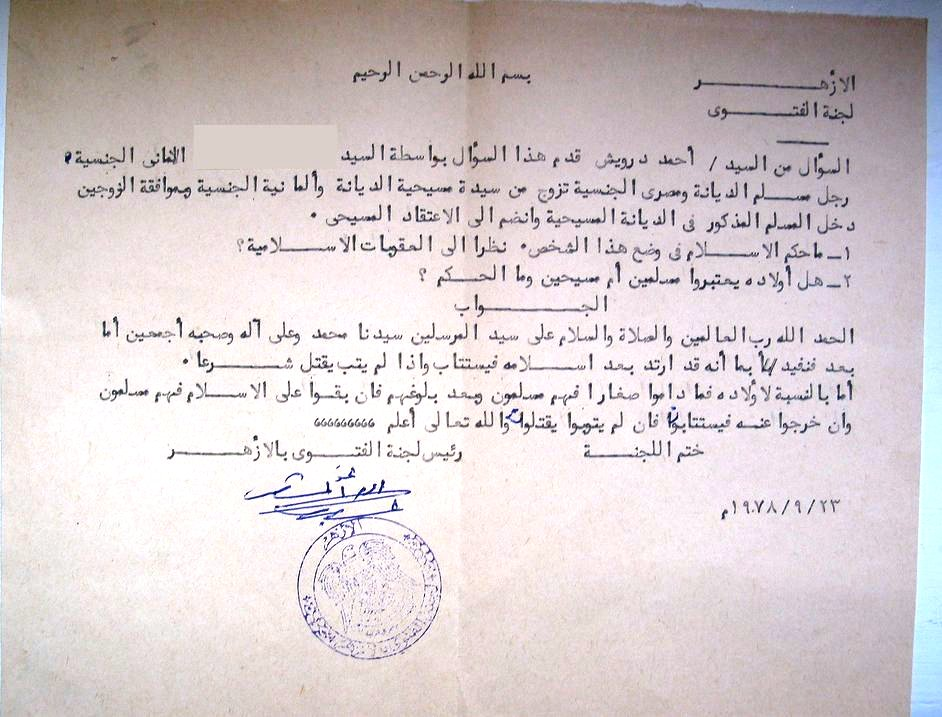
Legal opinion on apostasy by the Fatwa committee at Al-Azhar University in Cairo, the highest Islamic institution in the world, concerning the case of a man who converted to Christianity: "Since he left Islam, he will be invited to express his regret. If he does not regret, he will be killed pertaining to rights and obligations of the Islamic law."

In Islam, apostasy is called "ridda" ("turning back") and is considered to be a profound insult to God. A person born of Muslim parents that rejects Islam is called a "murtadd fitri" (natural apostate), and a person that converted to Islam and later rejects the religion is called a "murtadd milli" (apostate from the community).

A female apostate must be either executed, according to Shafi'i, Maliki, and Hanbali schools of Sunni Islamic jurisprudence (fiqh), or imprisoned until she reverts to Islam as advocated by the Sunni Hanafi school and by Shi'a scholars.

Ideally, the one performing the execution of an apostate must be an imam. At the same time, all schools of Islamic jurisprudence agree that any Muslim can kill an apostate without punishment.

However, while almost all scholars agree about the punishment, many disagree on the allowable time to retract the apostasy. S. A. Rahman, a former Chief Justice of Pakistan, argues that there is no indication of the death penalty for apostasy in the Qur'an.

Javed Ahmad Ghamidi a prominent Islamic scholar who studied under Syed Abul Ala Maududi & Amin Ahsan Islahi, says killing of apostates was only for a special period after the Itmam e Hujjat.

== Promotion ==
27 October is International Religious Freedom Day, in commemoration of the execution of the Boston martyrs, a group of Quakers executed by the Puritans on Boston Common for their religious beliefs under the legislature of the Massachusetts Bay Colony between 1659 and 1661. On October 27, 1553, Michael Servetus was burned alive for heresy in Geneva. On October 27, 1998, President Bill Clinton signed the International Religious Freedom Act.

The International Religious Freedom or Belief Alliance (IRFBA) is a network of countries promoting freedom of religion or belief (FoRB) worldwide.

There exists an International Panel of Parliamentarians for Freedom of Religion or Belief.

== Measurement ==
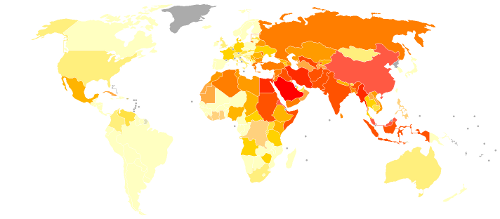
Freedom of religion by country (Pew Research Center study, 2009). Light yellow: low restriction; red: very high restriction on freedom of religion.

Religious freedom is measured in the non-profit organization Freedom House's annual report, Freedom in the World. Alongside other monitoring efforts, the annual Freedom of Thought Report by Humanists International assesses the situation of non-religious people by country in the context of rights related to belief and expression.

In its 2011 annual report, the United States Commission on International Religious Freedom designated fourteen nations as "countries of particular concern". The commission chairman commented that these are nations whose conduct marks them as the world's worst religious freedom violators and human rights abusers. The fourteen nations designated were Burma, China, Egypt, Eritrea, Iran, Iraq, Nigeria, North Korea, Pakistan, Saudi Arabia, Sudan, Turkmenistan, Uzbekistan, and Vietnam. Other nations on the commission's watchlist include Afghanistan, Belarus, Cuba, India, Indonesia, Laos, Russia, Somalia, Tajikistan, Turkey, and Venezuela.

There are concerns about the restrictions on public religious dress in some European countries (including the Hijab, Kippah, and Christian cross). Article 18 of the UN International Covenant on Civil and Political Rights limits restrictions on freedom to manifest one's religion or beliefs to those necessary to protect public safety, order, health, or morals or the fundamental rights and freedoms of others. Freedom of religion as a legal concept is related to, but not identical with, religious toleration, separation of church and state, or secular state (laïcité).

== Contemporary restrictions ==
Blasphemy laws and penalties by jurisdiction: Death sentences Prison sentences Fines, other restrictions, or unknown penalty Blasphemy is a common law offence Blasphemy laws repealed No blasphemy laws

The Pew Research Center has performed studies on international religious freedom between 2009 and 2022, compiling global data from 16 governmental and non-governmental organizations – including the United Nations, the United States State Department, and Human Rights Watch – and representing over 99.5 percent of the world's population. In 2009, nearly 70 percent of the world's population lived in countries classified as having heavy restrictions on freedom of religion. This concerns restrictions on religion originating from government prohibitions on free speech and religious expression as well as social hostilities undertaken by private individuals, organisations and social groups. Social hostilities were classified by the level of communal violence and religion-related terrorism.

While most countries provided for the protection of religious freedom in their constitutions or laws, only a quarter of those countries were found to fully respect these legal rights in practice. In 75 countries, governments limit the efforts of religious groups to proselytise, and in 178 countries, religious groups must register with the government. In 2013, Pew classified 30% of countries as having restrictions that tend to target religious minorities, and 61% of countries have social hostilities that tend to target religious minorities.

The countries in North and South America reportedly had some of the lowest levels of government and social restrictions on religion, while The Middle East and North Africa were the regions with the highest. Saudi Arabia and Iran were the countries that top the list of countries with the overall highest levels of restriction on religion. Topping the Pew 2022 government restrictions index were Saudi Arabia, Iran, Afghanistan, Russia, Uzbekistan, China, Egypt, Burma, Maldives, and Malaysia.

Of the world's 25 most populous countries, Egypt, India, Pakistan, Iran and Nigeria had the overall highest levels of restriction, while Japan, South Africa, the United States, the United Kingdom and the Democratic Republic of the Congo had some of the lowest levels, as measured by Pew in 2022.

Vietnam and China were classified as having high government restrictions on religion but were in the moderate or low range when it came to social hostilities. Nigeria, Bangladesh and India were high in social hostilities but moderate in terms of government actions.

Restrictions on religion across the world increased between mid-2009 and mid-2010, according to a 2012 study by the Pew Research Center. Restrictions in each of the five major regions of the world increased – including in the Americas and sub-Saharan Africa, the two regions where overall restrictions previously had been declining. In 2010, Egypt, Nigeria, the Palestinian territories, Russia, and Yemen were added to the "very high" category of social hostilities. The five highest social hostility scores were for Pakistan, India, Sri Lanka, Iraq, and Bangladesh. In 2015, Pew published that social hostilities declined in 2013, but the harassment of Jews increased.

In the Palestinian territories, Palestinians face tight restrictions on practicing the freedom of religion due to the ongoing Israeli–Palestinian conflict. In a report published by the Geneva-based Euro-Mediterranean Human Rights Monitor, eyewitnesses reported systematic practices aiming at preventing young men and women from performing their prayers at Masjid Al-Aqsa. These practices include military orders issued by the Israeli Defense Army commander against specific Palestinians who have an effective role in Jerusalem, interrogating young men, and creating a secret blacklist of people who are prevented from entering the Al-Aqsa Mosque.

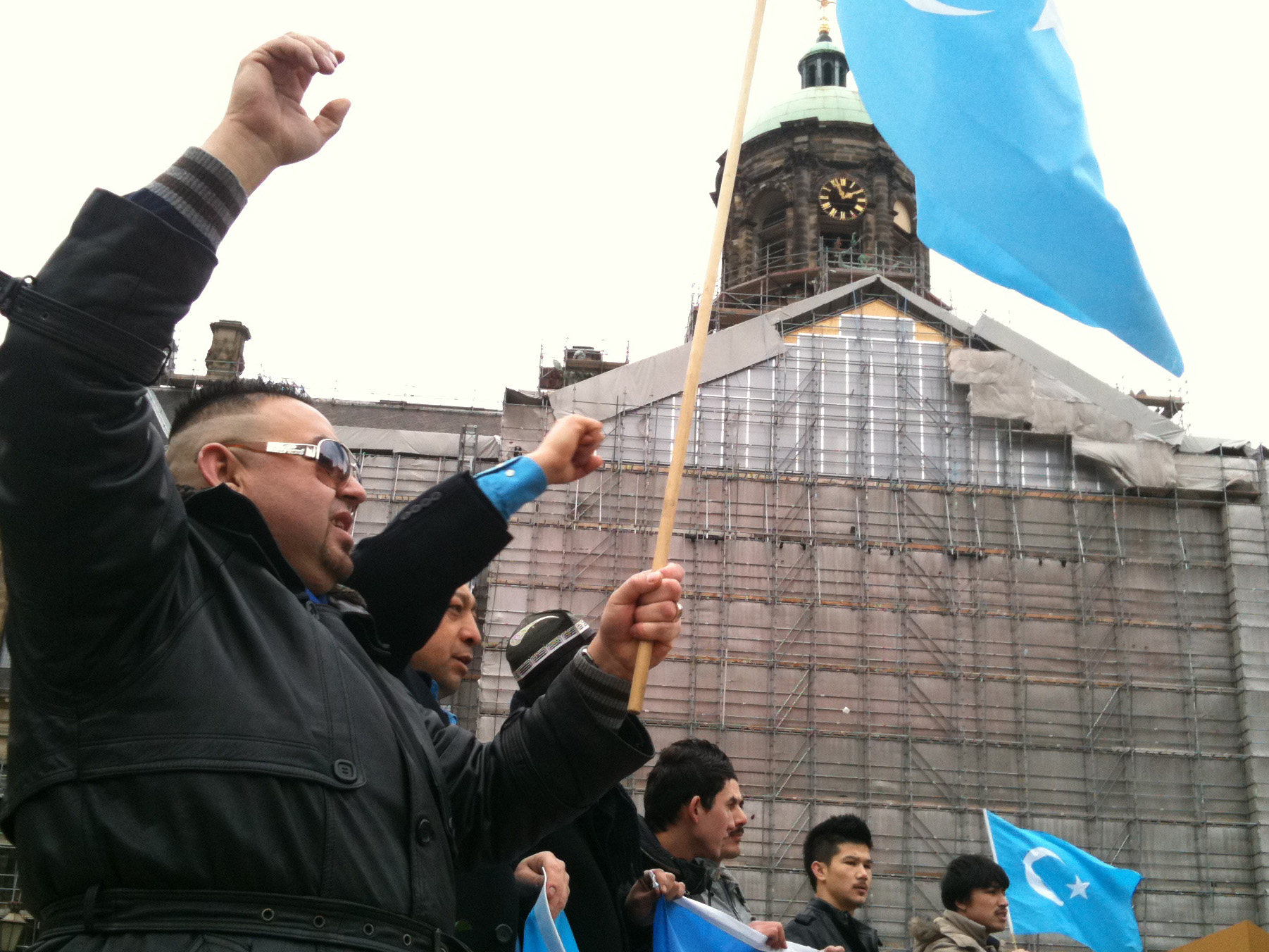
Uyghur protesters in Amsterdam in 2020 with the Flag of East Turkestan

The lack of religious freedom in China has led to Uyghur Muslims fleeing the country to take refuge in other parts of the world. Uyghurs abroad encounter digital surveillance and intimidation, where their families in China are sometimes being used as leverage. The diplomatic relations of Beijing have resulted in the abuse and detention of Uyghur Muslims even in abroad. Along with Egypt and Saudi Arabia, the government of UAE was reportedly one of the three Arab nations to have detained and deported Uyghur Muslims living in asylum in Dubai, back to China. The decision received a lot of criticism due to China's poor human rights records and no extradition agreement shared between the two countries. Thailand and Turkey also have detained and deported Uyghurs reportedly under the pressure of the Chinese government.

According to a 2021 report of the United Nations Office of the High Commissioner for Human Rights, UN human rights experts received credible information that the Chinese government continues to engage in forced organ harvesting against religious minorities such as Uyghurs and Falun Gong practitioners and the organs most likely harvested include “hearts, kidneys, livers, corneas and, less commonly, parts of livers.”

Raif Badawi, the Saudi blogger who was detained for 10 years and received 1,000 lashes in public in 2014, was released on 11 March 2022. The information of Raif's release was shared by his Quebec-based wife, Ensaf Haidar after she received a call from him. The Saudi blogger was fined, jailed, and flogged for criticizing his country's clerics through his writings. However, besides the said punishment, a 10-year passport ban was also imposed on Raif, restricting him from traveling outside Saudi Arabia. Reporters Without Borders claimed that they would work in order to get the travel ban removed to help Raif join his family in Canada.

== See also ==
- Anti-conversion law
- Blasphemy
- Blasphemy law
- Civil liberties
- Cognitive liberty
- Edict of toleration
- Freedom of assembly
- Freedom of association
- Freedom of religion by country
- Freedom of thought
- Hate speech
- International Association for Religious Freedom
- International Center for Law and Religion Studies
- International Coalition for Religious Freedom
- Liberty
- Religious conversion
- Religious discrimination
- Religious freedom bill
- Religious tolerance
- Religious education in primary and secondary education
- Separation of church and state
- Viewpoint discrimination
