= Carter v. Kentucky =

Carter vs. Kentucky
- Supreme Court of the United States

Argued January 14, 1981 Decided March 9, 1981
- Full case name: Lonnie Joe Carter v. Commonwealth of Kentucky
- Docket no.: 80-5060
- Citations: 450 U.S. 288 (more)

Case history
- Prior: Christian County Circuit Court (convicted and sentenced to 20 years); Kentucky Supreme Court (affirmed conviction); U.S. Supreme Court (granted certiorari)

Questions presented
- Is a trial Judge required to inform the Jury of his privilege against self-incrimination?

Holding
- Upon a request from a defendant in a criminal trial, the judge must inform the jury that a defendant is not compelled to testify and that the defendant's choice not to testify cannot be used for an inference of guilt and should not prejudice him in any way.

Court membership
- Chief Justice Warren E. Burger Associate Justices William J. Brennan Jr. · Potter Stewart; Byron White · Thurgood Marshall; Harry Blackmun · Lewis F. Powell Jr. William Rehnquist · John P. Stevens

Case opinions
- Majority: Stewart, joined by Burger, Brennan, White, Marshall, Blackmun, Powell, Stevens
- Concurrence: Powell
- Concurrence: Stevens, joined by Brennan
- Dissent: Rehnquist

Laws applied
- The Fifth Amendment

Carter v. Kentucky was a case in which the U.S. Supreme Court held that trial judges in criminal proceedings must, upon proper request of the defendant, inform the jury of his right against self-incrimination, and that its execution may not be used against him.

== Background ==
On Friday morning, December 22, 1978, while it was still dark, Officer Deborah Ellison of the Hopkinsville Police Department in Hopkinsville, Kentucky, noticed something strange in the alley between Young's Hardware Store and Edna's Furniture Store. After shining her spotlight down the alley, she saw two men who immediately fled the scene. After driving down the alley, she found a hole in the side of the hardware store. Knowing he was in the area she radioed for Officer Leroy Davis, reasonably suspecting, based upon the totality of circumstances, that they were involved in criminal activity, because: 1) They were in an alley in the dark; 2) They immediately fled; and 3) there was an opening to the store in the area they were at. Officer Ellison inspected the alleyway. At the same time, Officer Davis saw the two men run off in different directions, and, after a chase, stopped one, whose name was Lonnie Joe Carter. Carter had dropped a gym bag and a radio tuned to a Police band. When caught he was wearing gloves, but no jacket. Officer Ellison found two men's jackets as well as some stolen merchandise in the alley near the hole in the wall. After being brought to her, Officer Ellison noted Officer Davis that Carter "was of similar height and weight to one of the men in the alley, and that he wore similar clothing." She could not give a more positive identification, however, because the alley was dark. Carter was taken to Police headquarters.

Carter's counsel requested at trial that the jury be given the following instruction: "The [defendant] is not compelled to testify and the fact that he does not cannot be used as an inference of guilt and should not prejudice him in any way." The Judge, however, refused the request, and the Jury found him guilty of third-degree burglary, recommending a sentence of two years in prison. Following was the recidivist phase of the trial, in which the prosecution showed forth evidence of previous felony convictions. The defense presented no evidence, and the Jury found him guilty as a persistent offender, sentencing him to twenty years in prison. Carter appealed.

The Supreme Court of the State of Kentucky argued two things: 1) There is no case law within the jurisdiction supporting the idea that the Fifth and Fourteenth Amendment procedural due process rights included a right to have the Jury be informed of the privilege against self-incrimination; and 2) The Judge would have had to comment upon the defendant's failure to testify, violating Kentucky Revised Statute 421.225. Because the statute as interpreted did not violate the Constitution as interpreted, the Statute must control the proceedings within the courtroom. Thus the Supreme Court affirmed the decision in Green v. Commonwealth, affirming the trial court's conviction. Carter appealed.

== Decision ==
In an 8–1 decision, the U.S. Supreme Court reversed the Kentucky Supreme Court's decision and remanded the case back for further proceedings. The court had held in Bruno v. United States that federal defendants were granted that right in federal court, but the decision came as a result of a federal statute rather than constitutional law. The court additionally held in Griffin v. California that the right to remain silent may not be used as evidence against one's self and that a Judge may not make that presumption to the Jury. The Court held in Lakeside v. Oregon that a Judge may choose to give the Jury instruction at question in this case even with the objection of the defense counsel. But no case had established a Constitutional right to have the Jury provided the instruction at the request of the defendant until this point. The Court stated:

"The freedom of a defendant in a criminal proceeding to remain silent 'unless he chooses to speak in the unfettered exercise of his own will' is guaranteed by the Fifth Amendment and made applicable to state criminal proceedings through the Fourteenth. And the Constitution further guarantees that no adverse inferences are to be drawn from the exercise of that privilege. Just as adverse comment on a defendant's silence 'cuts down on the privilege by making its assertion costly,' the failure to limit the jurors' speculation on the meaning of that silence, when the defendant makes a timely request that a prophylactic instruction be given, exacts an impermissible toll on the full and free exercise of the privilege. Accordingly, we hold that a state trial judge has the constitutional obligation, upon proper request, to minimize the danger that the jury will give evidentiary weight to a defendant's failure to testify."

Thus the Kentucky Supreme Court was reversed, and the judgement remanded to the State Supreme Court for further proceedings. In a short, three-sentence order, the Kentucky Supreme Court then reversed the trial court's conviction and remanded for a new trial, where he was again convicted and appealed.
