= Michael M. v. Superior Court of Sonoma County =

- Supreme Court of the United States

Argued November 4, 1980 Decided March 23, 1981
- Full case name: Michael M. v. Superior Court of Sonoma County (California, Real Party in Interest)
- Citations: 450 U.S. 464 (more) 101 S. Ct. 1200; 67 L. Ed. 2d 437; 1981 U.S. LEXIS 83; 49 U.S.L.W. 4273

Holding
- The statutory rape law of California did not violate the Equal Protection Clause.

Court membership
- Chief Justice Warren E. Burger Associate Justices William J. Brennan Jr. · Potter Stewart; Byron White · Thurgood Marshall; Harry Blackmun · Lewis F. Powell Jr. William Rehnquist · John P. Stevens

Case opinions
- Plurality: Rehnquist, joined by Burger, Stewart, Powell
- Concurrence: Stewart
- Concurrence: Blackmun (in judgment)
- Dissent: Brennan, joined by White, Marshall
- Dissent: Stevens

Laws applied
- Equal Protection Clause of the Fourteenth Amendment

Michael M. v. Superior Court of Sonoma County, 450 U.S. 464 (1981), was a United States Supreme Court case over the issue of gender bias in statutory rape laws. The petitioner argued that the statutory rape law discriminated based on gender and was unconstitutional. The court ruled that this differentiation passes intermediate scrutiny under the Equal Protection Clause because it serves an important state goal, stating that sexual intercourse entails a higher risk for women than men. Thus, the court found the law justified.

== Background ==
In June 1978, Sharon, a sixteen-year-old female, was at a park with seventeen-year-old Michael Douglas McMillan. The record indicates that Sharon was initially a willing participant, but when she refused intercourse, Michael hit her until she submitted.

A charge of statutory rape was filed against Michael in the Court of Sonoma County, CA. In California, statutory rape was, at the time, described as "an act of sexual intercourse accomplished with a female not the wife of the perpetrator, where the female is under the age of 18 years." The language of the statute made it so that only the male involved in the act could be found criminally liable, even if the act was consensual. Michael M. challenged the constitutionality of the law on the basis of Equal Protection Clause of the Fourteenth Amendment. The Equal Protection Clause prevents the state from denying "any person within its jurisdiction the equal protection of the laws." He claimed that the law discriminated based on gender, denied him protection of the law, and therefore violated the Constitution. The case was brought before the Supreme Court in 1980.

There was no charge of forcible rape (see controversies below).

== Supreme Court ==
=== Majority ===
Through intermediate scrutiny, the Court upheld the statute and its gender-based distinction because it helped to further an important state goal. It was a 5-4 vote upholding California's statute. However, the Justices who voted in the majority could not decide on a reason for their ruling, so the decision is considered a plurality.

Justices Rehnquist, Burger, Stewart, and Powell voted with the plurality and Justice Blackmun concurred in the judgment only. The main reasons behind their decision were that young females already faced a significant deterrent from engaging in sexual intercourse and that the statute furthered the state goal of preventing teenage pregnancy. In his written opinion, Justice Rehnquist said, "[t]he statute protects women from sexual intercourse and pregnancy at an age when the physical, emotional, and psychological consequences are particularly severe. Because virtually all of the significant harmful and identifiable consequences of teenage pregnancy fall on the female, a legislature acts well within its authority when it elects to punish only the participant who, by nature, suffers few of the consequences of his conduct." Because young women are faced with the risk of unwanted pregnancy when they engage in sexual intercourse, they already face a substantial deterrent and therefore don't necessarily need to be included in the law. The risks and consequences associated with teenage pregnancy are, according to the Court, enough of a discouragement to females. However, because males don't face the same physical, mental, and emotional risks associated with sex and teen pregnancy, "imposing criminal penalties on men was necessary to ‘roughly ‘equalize’ the deterrents on the sexes." The Court also said that because the statute helped to further a major goal of the state, it was constitutional and should be upheld. This form of judicial review is known as intermediate scrutiny. In order to pass an intermediate scrutiny test, "the challenged law must further an important government interest by means that are substantially related to that interest". According to Justice Rehnquist, the law aided in the prevention of teen pregnancy, which was a major goal of the state of California. In the trial, the state of California argued that, "the language of [the statutory rape law] and the policy and intent of the California legislature evinced in other legislation demonstrate that the prevention of pregnancy and the prevention of physical harm to female minors are the primary purposes underlying [the law]," This argument emphasizes how the gender bias found in California's statutory rape law aids in furthering the state's goal of preventing teenage pregnancy. The natural discouragements that females have in regards to sexual intercourse coupled with this statute and its singling out of males as the sole perpetrators together form a significant deterrent keeping teens from engaging in sexual intercourse. The statute takes steps to avoid teenage pregnancy and therefore helps to advance the state's goals. It was because of these reasons that the Court upheld the law.

=== Concurrence ===
Justice Blackmun's concurrence in the judgement noted that because Sharon was a willing participant in the initial foreplay with a stranger while both were inebriated and both parties were of a similar age, he argued that the state should have charged McMillan with a misdemeanor instead of a statutory rape felony.

=== Dissent ===
Justices Brennan, White, Marshall, and Stevens dissented. The minority stated that the majority placed "too much emphasis on the desirability of achieving the State's asserted statutory goal - prevention of teenage pregnancy - and not enough emphasis on the fundamental question of whether the sex-based discrimination in the California statute is substantially related to the achievement of that goal." The dissenters felt that Rehnquist's opinion emphasized the goal of the state without any regard to the means or to the actual question at hand. They questioned whether gender-neutral statutory rape law would actually be harmful to California's goal of lowering teen pregnancy rates, since no evidence that a gender-biased law would be beneficial was provided.

Justice Brennan wrote, "[t]he burden is on the government to prove both the importance of its asserted objective and the substantial relationship between the classification and that objective. And the State cannot meet that burden without showing that a gender-neutral statute would be a less effective means of achieving that goal." Without any factual evidence or comparison, according to the dissenters it is difficult to tell whether a gender-biased statute actually lowers teen pregnancy rates.

Brennan also cited that at the time of the trial, thirty-seven other states had adopted gender-neutral statutory rape laws. He hypothesized that gender-neutral laws might be a greater deterrent than non-gender neutral laws because there would be "twice as many potential violators." Justice Stevens added that he thought there was no reason to not include a woman in the law because women are "capable of using [their] own judgment of whether or not to assume the risk of sexual intercourse".

== Outcome ==
By the time the Supreme Court delivered its judgement in March 1981, McMillan was on parole from his assault and robbery charges. With approval for enforcement, the California state government tried resuming McMillan's trial for statutory rape, only to find that Sharon had intentionally fled the region to avoid being subpoenaed and forced to recount the incident. Thus, the extended judicial process that ultimately agreed on the validity of California's approach to statutory rape ironically allowed McMillan to escape punishment.

California changed its law to make unlawful sexual intercourse a gender-neutral crime, in that all forms of sexual conduct with a person under 18 are illegal. This means that if a 16-year-old boy and a 17-year-old girl have consensual sex, both can be charged with a crime. However, penalties have been reduced from a felony to a misdemeanor if the older participant is no more than 4 years older.
