= H. L. v. Matheson =

- Supreme Court of the United States

Argued October 6, 1980 Decided March 23, 1981
- Full case name: H. L. v. Scott M. Matheson, Governor of Utah, et al.
- Citations: 450 U.S. 398 (more) 101 S. Ct. 1164; 67 L. Ed. 2d 388; 1981 U.S. LEXIS 81

Case history
- Prior: 604 P.2d 907 (Utah 1979); probable jurisdiction noted, 445 U.S. 903 (1980).

Holding
- A state may require a doctor to inform a teenaged girl's parents before performing an abortion or face criminal penalty.

Court membership
- Chief Justice Warren E. Burger Associate Justices William J. Brennan Jr. · Potter Stewart; Byron White · Thurgood Marshall; Harry Blackmun · Lewis F. Powell Jr. William Rehnquist · John P. Stevens

Case opinions
- Majority: Burger, joined by Stewart, White, Powell, Rehnquist
- Concurrence: Powell, joined by Stewart
- Concurrence: Stevens
- Dissent: Marshall, joined by Brennan, Blackmun

H. L. v. Matheson, 450 U.S. 398 (1981), was a United States Supreme Court abortion rights case, according to which a state may require a doctor to inform a teenaged girl's parents before performing an abortion or face criminal penalty.

== Overview ==
A female minor, known by her initials H.L., was living in Utah with her parents when she became pregnant in 1978. A doctor advised H.L. that an abortion would be in her best medical interests. A Utah law enacted in 1974 required abortion providers to "[n]otify, if possible" the parents of any female under the age of majority who is scheduled to undergo an abortion, at least 24 hours before the abortion. Violation was a misdemeanor subject to a fine up to $1000 and/or several months imprisonment. H.L's doctor's believed that "for [her] own reasons", she should proceed with the abortion without notifying her parents. A trial judge held the meeting, with H.L being the only witness present. During the trial, she confirmed the allegations of her complaint with one word answers. When the State tried asking her about why she didn't to tell her parents, H.L's counsel objected, saying it was unrelated to the laws Constitutional issue. H.L's doctor insisted that the only Constitutionally permissible requirements were the desire of the girl and the medical approval of a physician. The judge objected, construing the statute to require parental knowledge of the abortion "if [they are] able to contact them". After this, the judge entered findings of fact. He concluded that the appealant "is an appropriate representative to represent the class she purports to represent.". Then, he yet again construed the statute to require a notice to parents for the knowledge of the abortion "if it is physically possible". He finally concluded that statute § 76-7-304(2) "do[es] not unconstitutionally restrict the right of privacy of a minor to obtain an abortion or to enter into a doctor-patient relationship.". He then dismissed the complaint. When reappealed, the court kept the statute unchanged with a 6-3 vote.H.L. initiated a lawsuit as part of a proposed class action of unmarried unemancipated females, arguing that Utah's parental notification statute was unconstitutional. Scott M. Matheson, then the governor of Utah, was named as the defendant.

The case made its way to the Utah Supreme Court, where the law was upheld as consistent with Roe v. Wade (1973). The judgment noted, among other points, that H.L.'s proposed class action was overly broad; and that the Utah statute mandated parental notification but did not grant parents authority to stop such an abortion.

== See also ==
- List of United States Supreme Court cases, volume 450
