= Board of Governors, FRS v. Investment Co. Institute =

Board of Governors, FRS v. Investment Company Institute
- Supreme Court of the United States

Argued October 15, 1980 Decided February 24, 1981
- Full case name: Board of Governors of Federal Reserve System v. Investment Company Institute
- Citations: 450 U.S. 46 (more) 101 S. Ct. 973; 67 L. Ed. 2d 36

Case history
- Prior: Certiorari to the United States Court of Appeals for the District of Columbia Circuit

Holding
- The amendment to Regulation Y does not exceed the Board's statutory authority.

Court membership
- Chief Justice Warren E. Burger Associate Justices William J. Brennan Jr. · Potter Stewart; Byron White · Thurgood Marshall; Harry Blackmun · Lewis F. Powell Jr. William Rehnquist · John P. Stevens

Case opinion
- Majority: Stevens, joined unanimously
- Stewart, Powell, Rehnquist took no part in the consideration or decision of the case.

Board of Governors, FRS v. Investment Company Institute, 450 U.S. 46 (1981), was a decision by the United States Supreme Court, which held that the Federal Reserve's amendment to Regulation Y, which lowered regulatory burdens on well-managed banks did not exceed the Board's statutory authority.

== See also ==
- List of United States Supreme Court cases, volume 450
- Glass–Steagall Act
- Bloomberg L.P. v. Board of Governors of the Federal Reserve System
