= Texas Department of Community Affairs v. Burdine =

Texas Dept. of Community Affairs v. Burdine
- Supreme Court of the United States

Argued December 9, 1980 Decided March 4, 1981
- Full case name: Texas Dept. of Community Affairs v. Burdine
- Citations: 450 U.S. 248 (more) 101 S. Ct. 1089; 67 L. Ed. 2d 207; 1981 U.S. LEXIS 75; 49 U.S.L.W. 4214; 25 Fair Empl. Prac. Cas. (BNA) 113; 25 Empl. Prac. Dec. (CCH) ¶ 31,544

Case history
- Prior: 608 F.2d 563 (vacated and remanded)

Holding
- In a Title VII discrimination claim, the ultimate burden of persuasion remains with the plaintiff throughout the trial; a shift to a defendant's burden is merely an intermediate evidentiary burden requiring the defendant to sustain only the burden of production, not the burden of persuasion.

Court membership
- Chief Justice Warren E. Burger Associate Justices William J. Brennan Jr. · Potter Stewart; Byron White · Thurgood Marshall; Harry Blackmun · Lewis F. Powell Jr. William Rehnquist · John P. Stevens

Case opinion
- Majority: Powell, joined by unanimous

Laws applied
- Title VII of the Civil Rights Act of 1964

Texas Department of Community Affairs v. Burdine, 450 U.S. 248 (1981), is a United States labor law case of the United States Supreme Court.

== Facts ==
Ms Burdine, a female employee, alleged that the defendant's failure to promote her and subsequent decision to terminate her were premised on illegal gender discrimination.

== Judgment ==
=== Court of Appeals ===
The Court of Appeals held that the defendant carried the burden of proving by a preponderance of the evidence that he had legitimate reasons for the employment decision, and that others promoted and hired were better qualified than the plaintiff.

=== Supreme Court ===
In holding that the circuit court misconstrued the defendant's evidentiary burden, the Supreme Court attempted to set out the proper approach. The Court concluded that the ultimate burden of persuasion remained with the plaintiff throughout the trial. The Court explained that the defendant's burden was merely an intermediate evidentiary burden requiring the defendant to sustain only the burden of production, never the burden of persuasion. The burden of proof, therefore, never actually shifted from the plaintiff to the defendant but remained with the plaintiff. Furthermore, the Court specified that to rebut the plaintiff's prima facie case, the defendant must simply set forth the reasons for the plaintiff's rejection. Specifically, the employer must create a genuine issue as to whether he intended to discriminate.

== Significance ==
In limiting the defendant's burden merely to producing evidence and placing the entire burden of persuasion on the plaintiff, the Court made it more difficult for the plaintiff to succeed with a disparate treatment claim. A defendant could sustain his or her duty to produce evidence simply by articulating a nondiscriminatory justification for the employment decision. Because this burden is so easily met, the plaintiff will almost always be forced to persuade a court that the defendant's reasons are pretexts and not the true reasons for the employment decision. The plaintiff's burden, therefore, is magnified because he will have to proffer convincing evidence analyzing the employer's intent. Consequently, this higher evidentiary burden has created an increased incentive for plaintiffs to allege discrimination under the disparate impact theory where the employer's intent is not at issue.

== See also ==
- List of United States Supreme Court cases, volume 450
