= Wood v. Georgia (1981) =

- Supreme Court of the United States

Argued November 4, 1980 Decided March 4, 1981
- Full case name: Raymond WOOD et al v. State of Georgia
- Citations: 450 U.S. 261 (more) L. Ed. 2d 220, 101 S. Ct. 1097

Holding
- Where counsel retained by defendants' employer potentially had conflict between defendants' interests and employer's, and facts indicating potential conflict were known to trial judge, the trial judge should inquire further. Equal Protection inapplicable in this case.

Court membership
- Chief Justice Warren E. Burger Associate Justices William J. Brennan Jr. · Potter Stewart; Byron White · Thurgood Marshall; Harry Blackmun · Lewis F. Powell Jr. William Rehnquist · John P. Stevens

Case opinions
- Majority: Powell, joined by Burger, Stewart, Blackmun, Rehnquist,
- Concurrence: Stevens
- Concur/dissent: Brennan, joined by Marshall
- Dissent: White

Wood v. Georgia, 450 U.S. 261 (1981), was a United States Supreme Court case in which the court declined to issue a firm holding because the equal-protection claim at issue was not properly raised. Instead, the court observed that the defendants' lawyer had a divided loyalties issue because he was retained by the defendants' employer and facts indicating potential conflict were known to trial judge. The court said the trial judge should have inquired further and remanded to make that inquiry as a potential violation of the Fourteenth Amendment. One thing to take from this decision is that the defendants did not need to prove that they were prejudiced by the divided loyalties issue to have their case remanded.

== Decision ==
In a 6–3 majority delivered by Justice Lewis F. Powell Jr., the court ruled the conflict of interest required the case to be remanded for more fact-finding to prevent the possibility of due process violations. The court said the lawyer who was paid for by their employer could be "influenced in his basic strategic decisions by the interest of the employer who hired him." The court declined to consider the questions of equal protection raised in this case. Thus the case was remanded to resolve those issues.

== Later developments ==
The Supreme Court considered these conflict issues again in Mickens v. Taylor, 535 U.S. 162 (2002).
