= Bloomberg L.P. v. Board of Governors of the Federal Reserve System =

US legal case

- Court: United States District Court for the Southern District of New York
- Full case name: Bloomberg L.P., Plaintiff, v. Board of Governors of the Federal Reserve System, Defendant.
- Decided: August 24, 2009
- Docket nos.: 1:08-cv-09595

Court membership
- Judge sitting: Loretta A. Preska

Bloomberg L.P. v. Board of Governors of the Federal Reserve System, 1:08-cv-09595, was a lawsuit by Bloomberg L.P. against the Board of Governors of the Federal Reserve System for disclosure of information about banks and other financial institutions that had borrowed from the Federal Reserve discount window during the United States housing bubble and 2008 financial crisis.

During the 2008 financial crisis, the U.S. Congress, Federal Reserve, Treasury Department and Federal Deposit Insurance Corporation, developed the Emergency Economic Stabilization Act of 2008 to shore up financial institutions by purchasing mortgage-backed securities, and loaning cash directly to banks and bank holding companies. Many of the distressed banks would not come forward to accept such loans publicly for fear of a bank run and loss of investors. As a result, the Federal Reserve developed a program for those banks and financial institutions to access the discount window which is not normally subject to publication.

As part of investigative reporting conducted by journalists Mark Pittman and Bob Ivry, Bloomberg L.P. was denied a request to the Federal Reserve, under the Freedom of Information Act, for disclosure of borrower banks and their collateral. Subsequently, a lawsuit was filed with United States District Court for the Southern District of New York on November 7, 2008, in order to force disclosure.

On August 24, 2009, Chief U.S. District Judge Loretta Preska ruled that the Federal Reserve had until September 14 to disclose the information. Later, on August 27, the court agreed to the Fed's request to delay implementation of a ruling until the Court of Appeals acts on its appeal. It was given until no later than September 30, 2009 to obtain an appeals authorization. The case was successfully appealed to the United States Court of Appeals for the Second Circuit.

March 19, 2010, a unanimous three judge panel of the appeals court ruled the Federal Reserve Board must release the documents. May 4, 2010, the Federal Reserve Board and The Clearing House Association L.L.C. appealed for a rehearing however, August 20, 2010, the United States Court of Appeals for the Second Circuit denied both requests. August 26, 2010, the Board filed a request to stay the judgement for appeal to the U.S. Supreme Court. On August 26, 2010, the court agreed to delay implementation of the ruling until October 19 so that the Fed may appeal to the Supreme Court.

The case was appealed but ultimately rejected on March 21, 2011. The Federal Reserve was required to release the data within five days to Bloomberg L.P.

== See also ==
- Board of Governors, FRS v. Investment Company Institute
