= Thomas v. Review Board of the Indiana Employment Security Division =

- Supreme Court of the United States

Argued October 7, 1980 Decided April 6, 1981
- Full case name: Thomas v. Review Board of the Indiana Employment Security Division et al.
- Citations: 450 U.S. 707 (more) 101 S. Ct. 1425; 67 L. Ed. 2d 624; 1981 U.S. LEXIS 11
- Argument: Oral argument

Case history
- Prior: Decision of the State Employment Security Review Board reversed, 381 N.E.2d 888 (Ind. Ct. App. 1978); reversed, 271 Ind. 233, 391 N.E.2d 1127 (1979); cert. granted, 444 U.S. 1070 (1980).

Holding
- "The State's denial of unemployment compensation benefits to petitioner violated his First Amendment right to free exercise of religion..."

Court membership
- Chief Justice Warren E. Burger Associate Justices William J. Brennan Jr. · Potter Stewart; Byron White · Thurgood Marshall; Harry Blackmun · Lewis F. Powell Jr. William Rehnquist · John P. Stevens

Case opinions
- Majority: Burger, joined by Brennan, Stewart, White, Marshall, Powell, Stevens; Blackmun (Parts I, II, III)
- Concurrence: Blackmun (concurring in part and concurring in the result)
- Dissent: Rehnquist

Laws applied
- U.S. Const. amend. I

Thomas v. Review Board of the Indiana Employment Security Division, 450 U.S. 707 (1981), was a case in which the Supreme Court of the United States held that Indiana's denial of unemployment compensation benefits to petitioner violated his First Amendment right to free exercise of religion.

== Background ==
Thomas, a Jehovah's Witness, asked his employer to lay him off after the company transferred all of its operations to weapon manufacturing, because his religious faith prohibited him from producing weapons. His employer refused and Thomas quit. He applied for unemployment compensation benefits under the Indiana Employment Security Act, but was denied. The Review Board of the Indiana Employment Security ruled that his voluntary termination due to his religious beliefs was not a "good cause [arising] in connection with [his] work" that would qualify him for benefits under the Indiana Employment Security Act.

The Indiana Court of Appeals reversed the decision and held that the Indiana statute, as applied, improperly burdened Thomas' First Amendment right to the free exercise of his religion.

The Indiana Supreme Court reinstated the Review Board's decision and ruled that his decision to quit was a "personal philosophical choice" that only indirectly burdened his free exercise right.

== Opinion of the Court ==
Chief Justice Warren Burger authored the 8-1 majority decision, which held that Indiana's denial of unemployment benefits to Thomas violated his First Amendment right to the free exercise of religion. The Court based its ruling on the precedents set in Everson v. Board of Education and Sherbert v. Verner, which establish that "[a] person may not be compelled to choose between the exercise of a First Amendment right and participation in an otherwise available public program."

The Indiana Supreme Court's analysis raised both free exercise and Establishment Clause questions. Although the administrative proceedings established that Thomas had quit because of his religious convictions, the state court concluded that this did not constitute good cause under Indiana law. It also reasoned that granting benefits to people who left work for religious reasons would favor them over people who left work for comparable nonreligious reasons. The U.S. Supreme Court considered this reasoning in light of Sherbert, explaining that denying benefits in these circumstances would impose a burden on the exercise of religion that the state could not justify by invoking the Establishment Clause.

The Indiana Supreme Court also questioned the religious basis of Thomas's objection, stating that "it is unclear what his belief was, and what the religious basis of his belief was." The Supreme Court recognized that courts may guard against fraudulent claims of religious belief. In Thomas's case, however, the administrative proceedings had already established that he left his job because of his religious convictions. That finding was supported by the record and was not challenged before the Supreme Court, which therefore had no occasion to reconsider it: "Courts are not arbiters of scriptural interpretation."

Justice Rehnquist dissented. He argued that the Free Exercise Clause did not require a "State to provide direct financial assistance to persons solely on the basis of their religious beliefs."

== Impact ==
Scholars viewed the Thomas decision as significant. It establishes a well-defined test to be applied in free exercise cases, and it expanded the First Amendment protection to beliefs that are neither well-defined nor clearly articulated.

In June 1981, two months after the Thomas decision, the U.S. Department of Labor issued a directive to state employment security agencies on how the Supreme Court's ruling impacted state laws regarding voluntary job resignation for religious reasons.

== See also ==
- List of United States Supreme Court cases, volume 450
