= List of United States Supreme Court cases, volume 450 =

This is a list of all the United States Supreme Court cases from volume 450 of the United States Reports:

Case name	Citation	Date decided
HCSC-Laundry v. United States	450 U.S. 1	1981
Weaver v. Graham	450 U.S. 24	1981
Hudson v. Louisiana	450 U.S. 40	1981
Board of Governors, FRS v. Investment Company Institute	450 U.S. 46	1981
Carson v. American Brands, Inc.	450 U.S. 79	1981
Steadman v. SEC	450 U.S. 91	1981
Democratic Party of United States v. Wisconsin ex rel. La Follette	450 U.S. 107	1981
INS v. Jong Ha Wang	450 U.S. 139	1981
Florida Dept. of Health and Rehabilitative Servs. v. Florida Nursing Home Assn.	450 U.S. 147	1981
Commissioner v. Portland Cement Co. of Utah	450 U.S. 156	1981
Diamond v. Diehr	450 U.S. 175	1981
Schweiker v. Wilson	450 U.S. 221	1981
Texas Dept. of Community Affairs v. Burdine	450 U.S. 248	1981
Wood v. Georgia	450 U.S. 261	1981
Carter v. Kentucky	450 U.S. 288	1981
Chicago & North Western Transp. Co. v. Kalo Brick & Tile Co.	450 U.S. 311	1981
Albernaz v. United States	450 U.S. 333	1981
Delta Air Lines, Inc. v. August	450 U.S. 346	1981
Diamond v. Bradley	450 U.S. 381	1981
Doe v. Delaware	450 U.S. 382	1981
H. L. v. Matheson	450 U.S. 398	1981
Kirchberg v. Feenstra	450 U.S. 455	1981
Michael M. v. Superior Court of Sonoma County	450 U.S. 464	1981
Rosewell v. LaSalle Nat. Bank	450 U.S. 503	1981
Montana v. United States	450 U.S. 544	1981
FCC v. WNCN Listeners Guild	450 U.S. 582	1981
San Diego Gas & Elec. Co. v. San Diego	450 U.S. 621	1981
Kassel v. Consolidated Freightways Corp. of Del.	450 U.S. 662	1981
Thomas v. Review Bd. of Indiana Employment Security Div.	450 U.S. 707	1981
Barrentine v. Arkansas-Best Freight System, Inc.	450 U.S. 728	1981
Universities Research Assn., Inc. v. Coutu	450 U.S. 754	1981
Schweiker v. Hansen	450 U.S. 785	1981
Bureau of Economic Analysis, Dept. of Commerce v. Long	450 U.S. 1301	1981
