= Indian Cemetery =

Indian Cemetery may refer to:

== Cemeteries ==
- Amara (Left Bank) Indian War Cemetery, Amarah, Iraq
- Huron Cemetery, or Huron Indian Cemetery, in Kansas City, Kansas
- Indian Mound Cemetery, Romney, West Virginia
- Jane Augustine Patencio Cemetery, Palm Springs, California
- La Pointe Indian Cemetery, on Madeline Island, Wisconsin
- Odd Fellows' Cemetery Mound, a Native American burial mound in Ohio
- Old Chief Joseph Gravesite, Joseph, Oregon
- Old Indian Cemetery, West Brookfield, Massachusetts
- Sherman Indian High School Cemetery, Riverside, California
- Stockbridge Indian Cemetery, Stockbridge, Wisconsin
- Wampanoag Royal Cemetery, Lakeville, Massachusetts

== Other ==
- Lyng v. Northwest Indian Cemetery Protective Ass'n, a United States Supreme Court case
