= Recognition of Native American sacred sites in the United States =

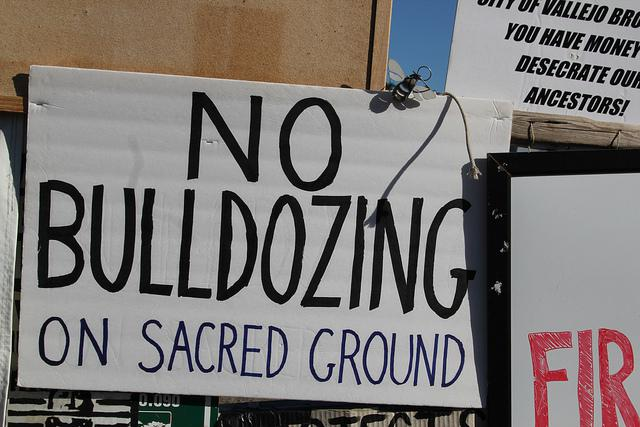
Protest at Glen Cove sacred burial site

The Recognition of Native American sacred sites in the United States could be described as "specific, discrete, narrowly delineated location on Federal land that is identified by an Indian tribe, or Indian individual determined to be an appropriately authoritative representative of an Indian religion, as sacred by virtue of its established religious significance to, or ceremonial use by, an Indian religion". The sacred places are believed to "have their own 'spiritual properties and significance'". Ultimately, Indigenous peoples who practice their religion at a particular site hold a special and sacred attachment to that land.

Among multiple issues regarding the human rights of Indigenous Peoples is the protection of these sacred sites. During colonization, Europeans claimed governance over the lands of numerous native tribes. After decolonization, Indigenous groups still fought federal governments to regain ownership of their ancestral lands, including the sacred sites and places. This conflict between the Indigenous groups has risen in the United States in recent years and the rights to the protection of sacred sites has been discussed through United States constitutional law and legislature.

The Religion Clauses of the First Amendment assert that the United States Congress has to separate church and state. The struggle to gain legal rights over the Glen Cove burial grounds in California is among many disputes between Indigenous groups and the federal government over sacred lands.

== United Nations Declaration on the Rights of Indigenous Peoples ==
The United Nations Declaration on the Rights of Indigenous Peoples was adopted by the United Nations in 2007. The declaration emphasizes the right of Indigenous peoples, some of which include the protection of sacred sites and their religious practices. Articles 11, 12, and 25 of the Declaration specifically addresses these rights.

=== Article 11 ===
Article 11 of the Declaration states:

1. Indigenous peoples have the right to practise and revitalize their cultural traditions and customs. This includes the right to maintain, protect and develop the past, present and future manifestations of their cultures, such as archaeological and historical sites, artefacts, designs, ceremonies, technologies and visual and performing arts and literature
2. States shall provide redress through effective mechanisms, which may include restitution, developed in conjunction with indigenous peoples, with respect to their cultural, intellectual, religious and spiritual property taken without their free, prior and informed consent or in violation of their laws, traditions and customs.

=== Article 12 ===
Article 12 of the Declaration States:

1. Indigenous peoples have the right to manifest, practise, develop and teach their spiritual and religious traditions, customs and ceremonies; the right to maintain, protect, and have access in privacy to their religious and cultural sites; the right to the use and control of their ceremonial objects; and the right to the repatriation of their human remains.
2. States shall seek to enable the access and/or repatriation of ceremonial objects and human remains in their possession through fair, transparent and effective mechanisms developed in conjunction with indigenous peoples concerned.

=== Article 25 ===
Article 25 of the Declaration states:

Indigenous peoples have the right to maintain and strengthen their distinctive spiritual relationship with their traditionally owned or otherwise occupied and used lands, territories, waters and coastal seas and other resources and to uphold their responsibilities to future generations in this regard.

== Applying the United States Legal System ==
=== Religion Clauses ===
Indigenous peoples in the United States argued that they have the right to protect sacred sites on the grounds of religious freedom. The Religion Clauses of the First Amendment have been two main documents discussed in the dispute of sacred sites protection.

==== Free Exercise Clause & Establishment Clause ====
The Free Exercise Clause and the Establishment Clause prevents the United States federal government from establishing a religion by emphasizing the separation of church and state. However, the basis of the Establishment Clauses causes a problem with regards of the protection of religious practices of religious liberties by the federal government.

In Sherbert v. Verner (1963), the Supreme Court held that a plaintiff must first demonstrate that the government had imposed a "burden on the free exercise of [their] religion," after which the government must show that its action is "justified by a compelling state interest." In Wisconsin v. Yoder (1972), the Court applied this standard to strike down a compulsory school attendance law as applied to Amish families, finding that enforcement of the law would "gravely endanger if not destroy the free exercise of their religious beliefs."

The Supreme Court landmark case directly addressing Indigenous sacred sites under the Free Exercise Clause is Lyng v. Northwest Indian Cemetery Protective Ass'n (1988). The case involved a federal plan to build a road and allow timber harvesting on national forest land in northern California that the Yurok, Karok, and Tolowa tribes used for religious ceremonies. A 1979 U.S. Forest Service study described the area as important to Indian religious practice and that "privacy, silence, and an undisturbed natural setting" were necessary for those practices to occur. In a 5–3 decision, the Court ruled in favor of the government. Writing for the majority, Justice O'Connor held that the Free Exercise Clause is only violated when the government "coerce[s] individuals into acting contrary to their religious beliefs" or "penalize[s] religious activity by denying any person an equal share of the rights, benefits, and privileges enjoyed by other citizens." Because the government did not prohibit the tribes from entering the land or impose penalties on their religious practices, the Court found no constitutional violation. The majority acknowledged that the construction could have "devastating effects on traditional Indian religious practices" and could "virtually destroy the . . . Indians' ability to practice their religion," but held that "the Constitution simply does not provide a principle that could justify upholding respondents' legal claims." Justice Brennan, joined by Justices Marshall and Blackmun, dissented, arguing that the Free Exercise Clause "is directed against any form of governmental action that frustrates or inhibits religious practice," and that the majority's decision left Native Americans with nothing more than "the right to believe that their religion will be destroyed."

Lyng is often understood as setting a narrow standard for Free Exercise claims involving Indigenous sacred sites. Under this decision, a burden on religious exercise is generally not established merely because government action damages or diminishes the religious value of a sacred site. Instead, courts ask whether the government has "coerce[d] [one] to act in violation of their beliefs", such as imposing penalties on religious practice. Indigenous claimants have often struggled to satisfy this requirement in federal land-management decisions, and courts therefore often do not reach the question of whether the government can justify its action with a compelling interest.

=== Article VI of United States Constitution ===
While the Religious Clause may puts limits on the actions of the federal government with regards to sacred sites protection, Article Six of United States Constitution require Congress to treat "’Indian affairs as a unique area of federal concern’". Any legal relationship between both parties is treated with special consideration in the basis that Indigenous peoples have become dependent on the United States government after the land was taken from them. As John R. Welch et al. states, "the government 'has charged itself with moral obligations of the highest responsibility and trust'". The federal government has a responsibility to maintain the agreements it made with the Indigenous peoples through the treaties. The federal government should "manage Indian trust lands and their bounties in the best interests of beneficiaries".

=== American Indian Religious Freedom and Restoration Act ===
The American Indian Freedom and Restoration Act, or the American Indian Religious Freedom Act (AIRFA), was passed by congress in 1978. The act was passed to recognize Indigenous people's religious practices by not limiting access to sacred sites. The act also obliges federal agencies to administer laws to "evaluate their policies in consultation" with Indigenous groups to assure that their religious practices are protected. Nonetheless, Arizona Democratic Representative Morris K. Udall, a cosponsor of AIRFA, asserted that the Act does "not create legal rights" and "'depends on Federal administrative good will'" for it to be applied. In Lyng v. Northwest Indian Cemetery Protective Ass'n (1988), the Supreme Court held that AIRFA “does not create any enforceable legal right” that would authorize courts to invalidate federal land-use decisions. Consequently, Indigenous groups are not able to effectively use AIRFA in their fight against public land management agencies.

=== Religious Freedom Restoration Act ===
The Religious Freedom Restoration Act (RFRA) was enacted in 1993 in response to the Supreme Court's decision in Employment Division v. Smith (1990). RFRA provides that the federal government "shall not substantially burden a person's exercise of religion" unless it demonstrates that the burden furthers a compelling governmental interest through the least restrictive means available. Under RFRA, a plaintiff can present a case by showing that the federal government's actions burdens his ability to exercise his religion.

In the context of Native American sacred sites, however, courts have generally continued to apply the coercion standard from Lyng when deciding whether a substantial burden exists. In Navajo Nation v. United States Forest Service (2008), the Navajo Nation, Hopi, and several other tribes challenged the approval of a ski resort to make artificial snow using recycled wastewater on the sacred San Francisco Peaks in Arizona by the United States Forest Service. The tribes argued that the treated wastewater would spiritually desecrate the mountain and make their religious practices there impossible. The Ninth Circuit rejected the claim, holding that the government had not coerced the tribes into violating their beliefs or denied them any rights shared by other citizens, and therefore no substantial burden existed under RFRA.

In Apache Stronghold v. United States (2024), the Apache Stronghold, a nonprofit organization of Apache and other Native peoples, sued under RFRA the federal land transfer of Oak Flat, a religious site for Apache ceremonies in Arizona, to the private copper mining company Resolution Copper. The proposed mining method would eventually cause the land to collapse into a large crater, permanently ending religious practice there. The Ninth Circuit rejected the claim, holding that the government's transfer of its own land did not amount to coercion under the Lyng standard, and that RFRA "subsumed rather than abrogated" the Lyng holding. The decision was sharply divided, with five of the eleven judges dissenting on the question of whether preventing someone from practicing their religion should count as a substantial burden. The Supreme Court declined to hear the case on May 27, 2025, allowing the Ninth Circuit’s decision in favor of the mine to stand.

=== National Environmental Policy Act ===
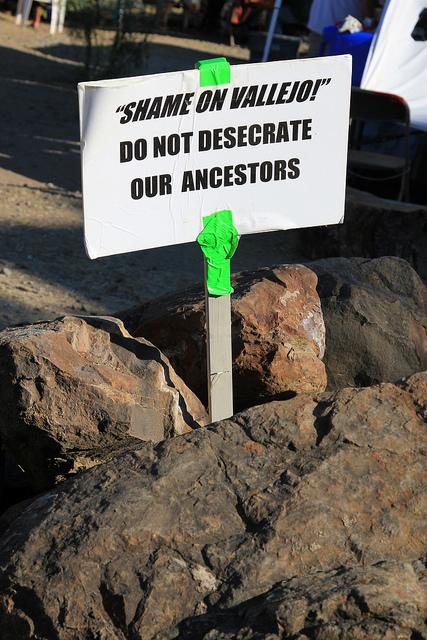

The National Environmental Policy Act (NEPA) is a national policy that promotes better environmental conditions by preventing the government from making damaging the environment. This Act relates to the sacred sites protection because it promotes and encourage a "harmonious" relationship between humans and the environment Furthermore, because this Act is a procedural law, those who bring a suit to the law must "allege a legal flaw in the process the agency followed to comply with NEPA such that the agency's final decision was reached without a complete understanding of the true effects of the action on the quality of the environment.

=== National Historic Preservation Act ===
The National Historic Preservation Act (NHPA) is procedural law that implements "a program for preservation of historic properties across the United States for reasons including the ongoing loss and alteration of properties important to the nation's heritage and to orient the American people to their cultural and historical foundations".

=== Executive Order 13007 ===
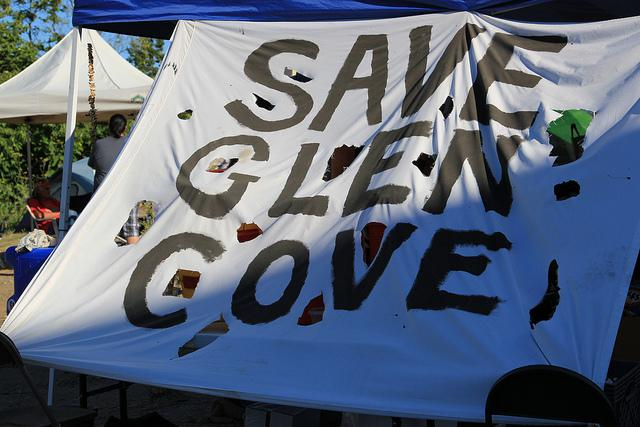

On May 24, 1996, President Bill Clinton issued Executive Order 13007. Under this order, executive branch agencies are required to: "(1) accommodate access to and ceremonial use of Indian sacred sites by religious practitioners and (2) avoid adversely affecting the physical integrity of such sites". This order holds management of Federal lands of taking the appropriate procedures to ensure that Indigenous peoples governments are involved in actions involving sacred sites.

== Glen Cove (Ssogoréate) Sacred Burial Sites ==
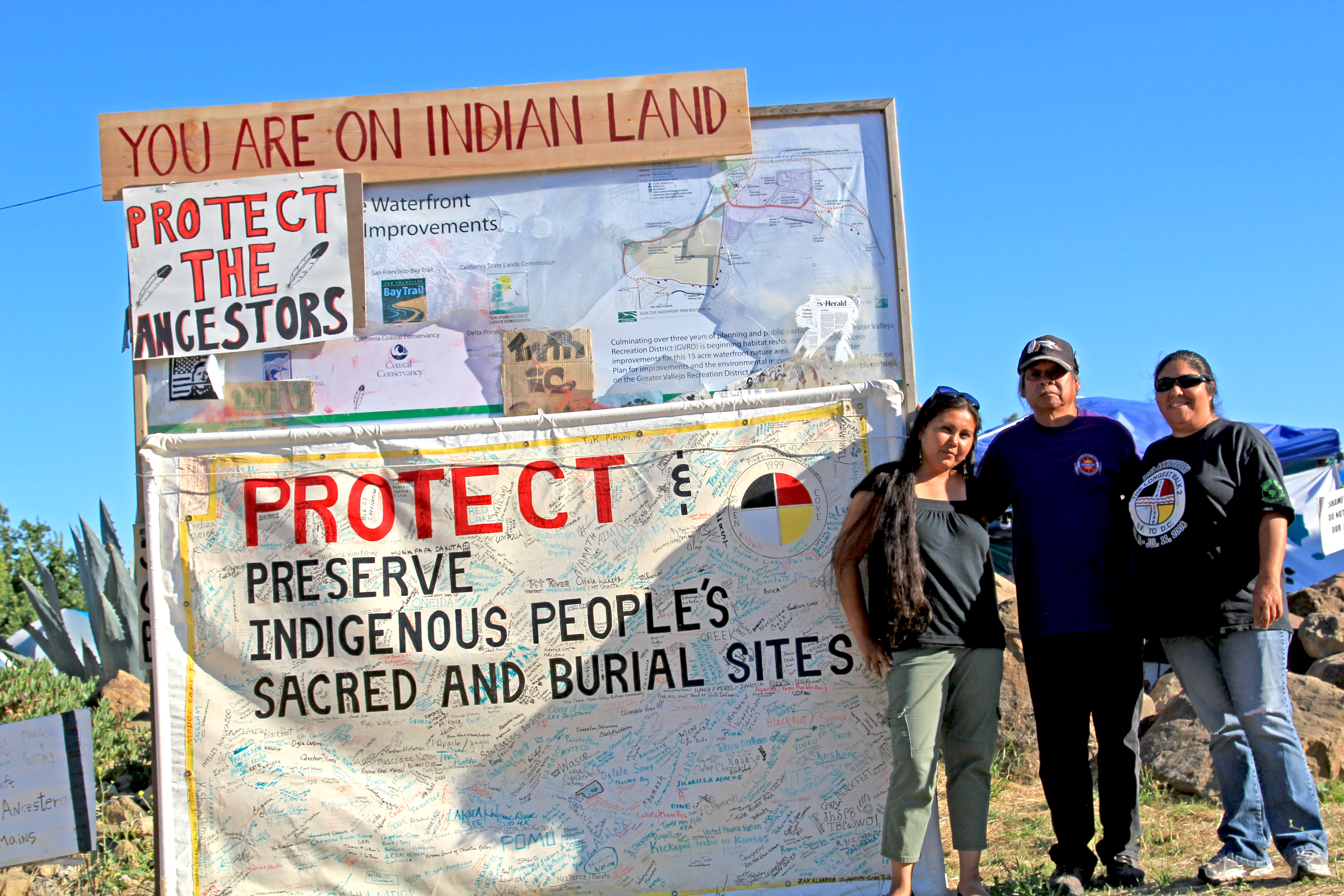
Protesters at Sogorea Te (Glen Cove) on Day 98—Natives gain jurisdiction of sacred sites and ancestral lands

Glen Cove, also known as Sogorea Te or Ssogoréate, is located in Vallejo, California and is a ceremonial and burial ground for native tribes living near the area for over 3,500 years. These tribes include the Ohlone, Patwin, Miwok, Yokuts, and Wappo. The Greater Vallejo Recreation District (GVRD)and the City of Vallejo wanted to turn the burial ground into a public park since 1988. The construction on the site requires removing the burials and sacred objects. The affected Indigenous tribes fought against the developing the land, claiming that doing so is a violation of their human and religious rights. They insist that the site means more to them than the members of the public, saying, "It is one of the few surviving remnants of our history on this land."

In protest of the GVRD development, The Protect Glen Cove Committee and the Board of Directors of Sacred Sites Protection (SSP&RIT) called for Indigenous activists to assemble at Glen Cove. Beginning April 14, 2011, Indigenous tribes and supporters began occupying the area by organizing daily spiritual gatherings and ceremonies.

On July 19, 2011, after 98 days of occupation and spiritual ceremonies, the Committee to Protect Glen Cove announced that the Indigenous tribes have won the jurisdiction over the land. The Yocha Dehe and Cortina tribes established a cultural easement and settlement agreement, which grants the tribes "legal oversight in all activities taking place on the sacred burial grounds of Sogoreate/Glen Cove".

== See also ==
- Arizona Snowbowl, See the sections, "Development controversy" & "2011 protests"
- Devils Tower National Monument
- Sogorea Te Land Trust
