= Basra Memorial =

War memorial in Iraq

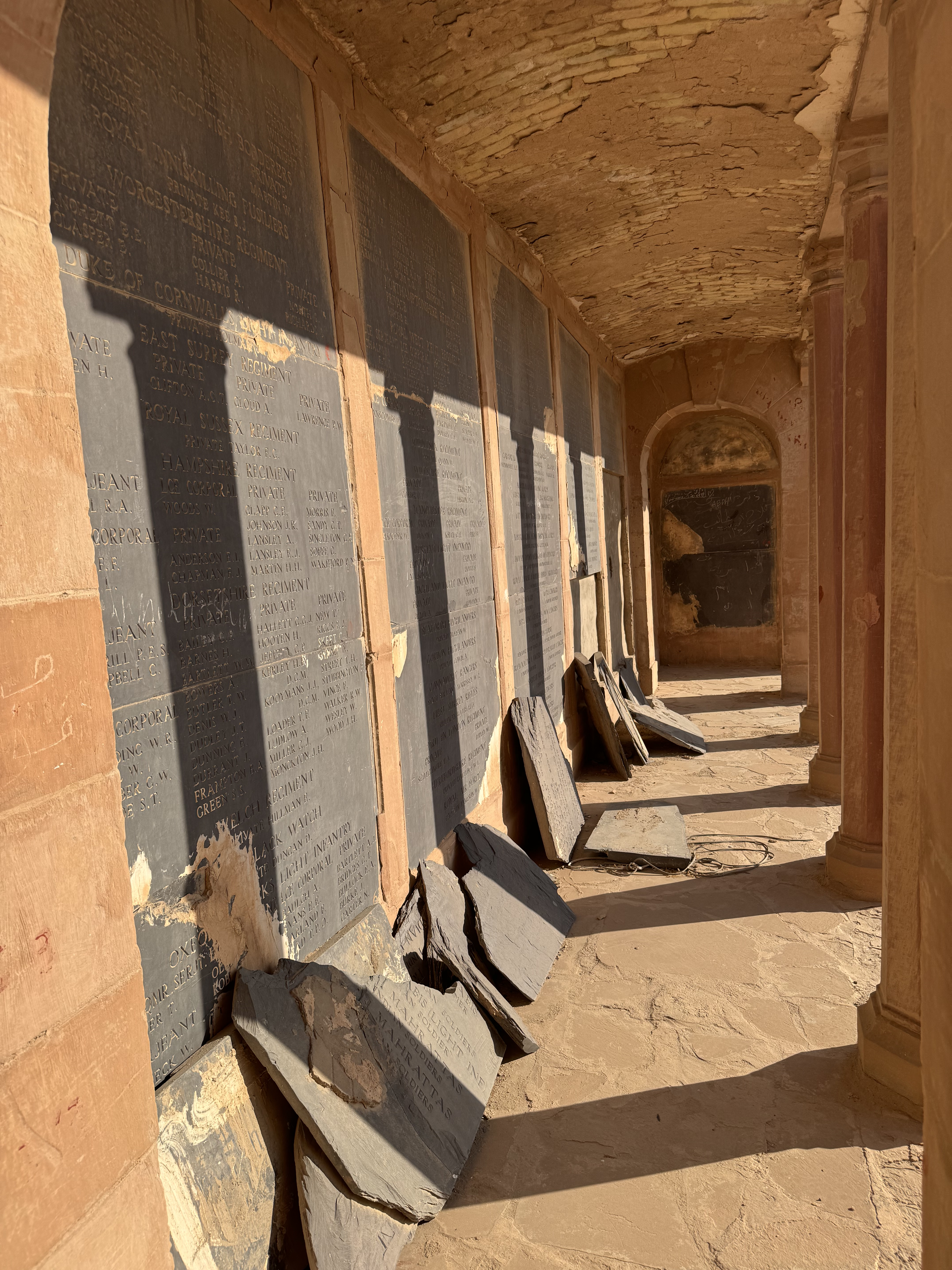
Panels 60–68 are the most damaged having delaminated from the walls.

The Basra Memorial is a Commonwealth War Graves Commission war memorial near Zubayr, Iraq. The memorial commemorates 40,682 Commonwealth forces members who died during the Mesopotamian Campaign, from the Autumn of 1914 to the end of August 1921, and whose graves are not known. The memorial was designed by Edward Prioleau Warren. It was unveiled by Gilbert Clayton on 27 March 1929. Originally located eight kilometers north of Basra, near the Shatt al-Arab River, it was moved southwest in 1997 to a battleground from the much more recent Gulf War. The memorial has not been maintained for over 30 years but remains in reasonably good condition with only 8 of the 68 panels damaged or delaminated from the wall. Of the 40,682 only 7,385 British personnel (including white colonial troops from New Zealand and Australia) and Indian Officers are mentioned by name with 33,256 Indian NCO and other ranks only listed by unit and total casualties.

== Current State ==
The Telegraph reported on 10 November 2013 that the memorial had suffered vandalism, with some of its items missing which include the Cross of Remembrance and the bronze plaques from the Wall of Remembrance, carrying the names of the fallen. Without any ongoing efforts at maintenance by the CWGC the site is in a poor state of repair although approximately 62 of the 68 panels are still present and readable.

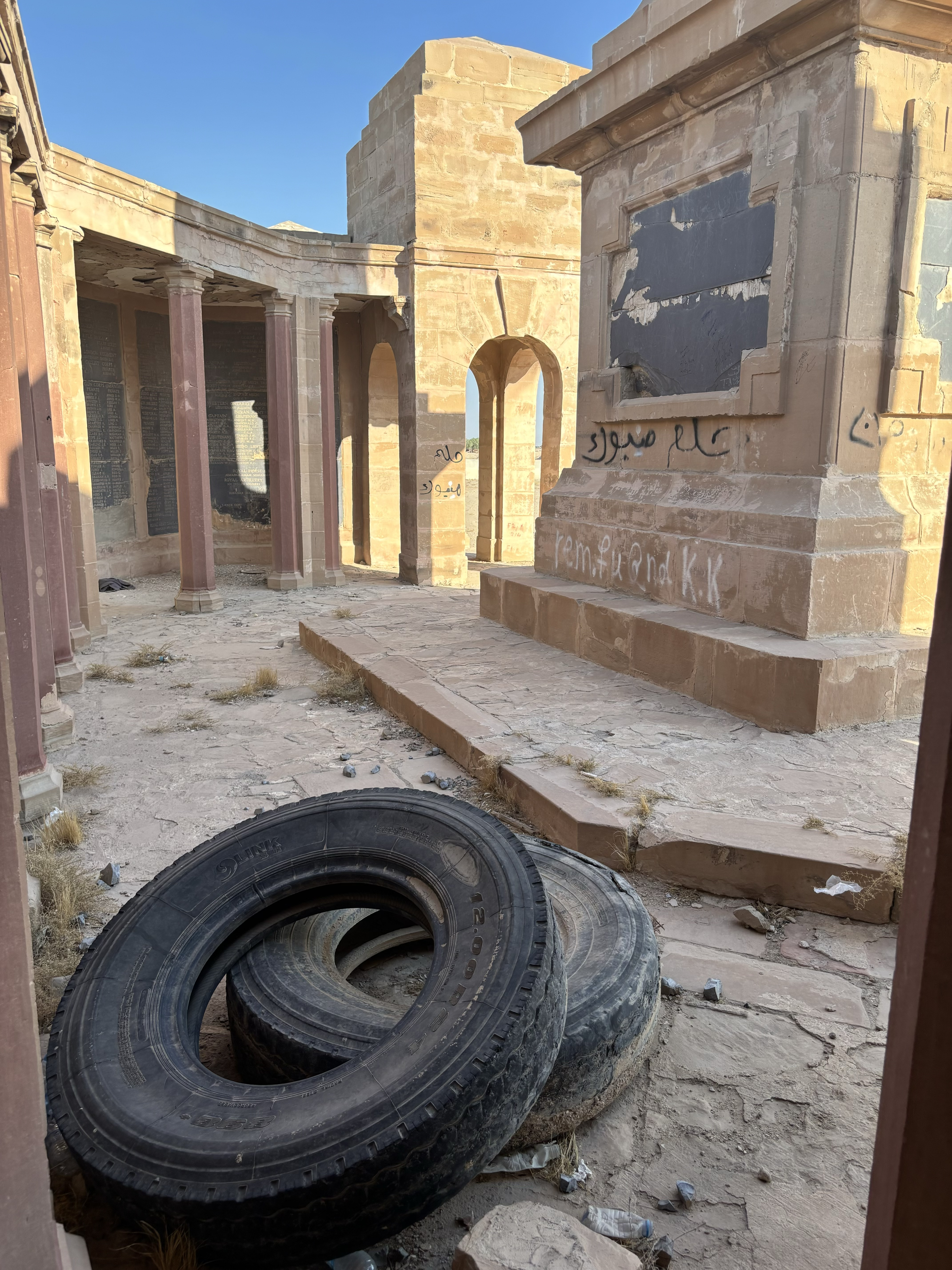
Neglect in the memorial, July 2024

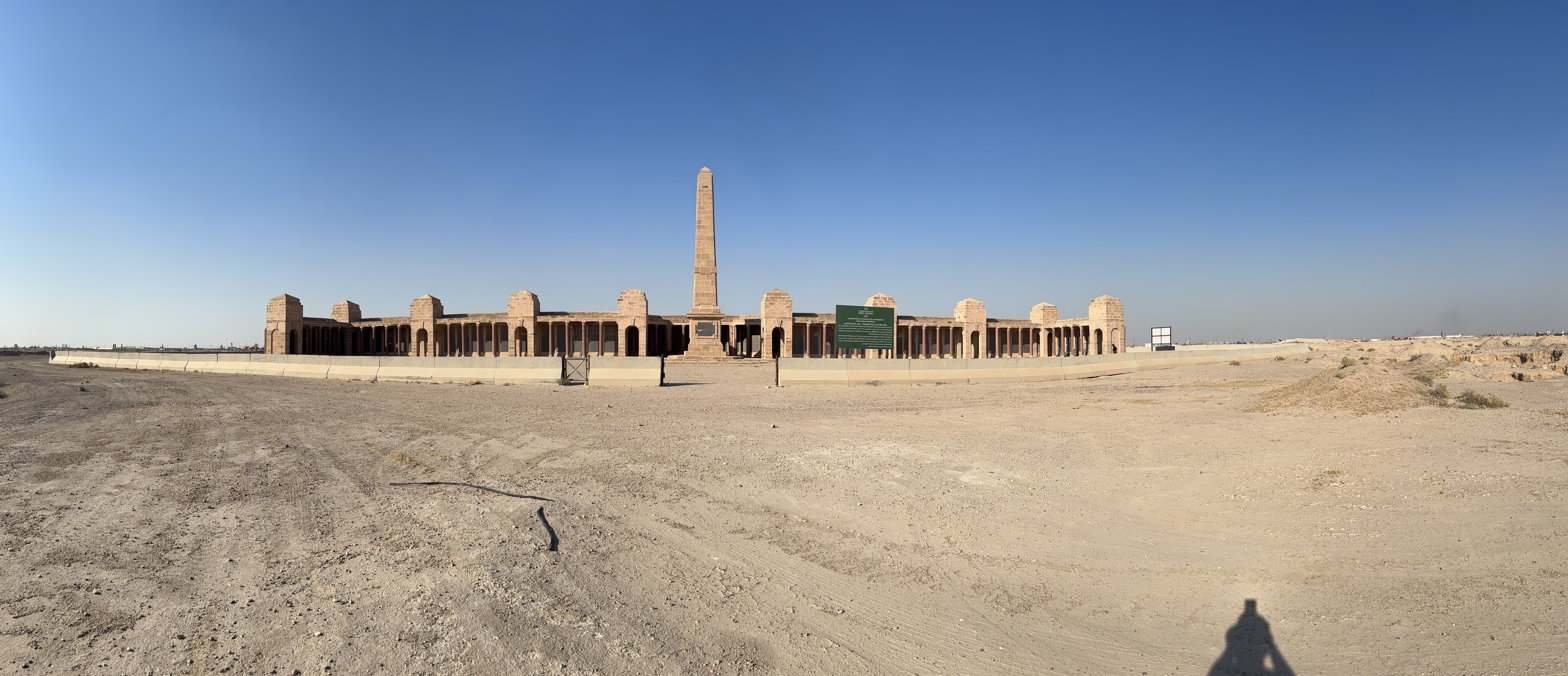
Basra Memorial July 2024

The BBC reported in 2016 that Colin Kerr, then the Commonwealth War Graves Commission (CWGC) publicity director, said that a total of 30,000 Indian soldiers are not named on the Basra memorial, despite fallen British soldiers being named, only Indian officers are accorded with the honor. The deaths of the non-commissioned men are commemorated by regiment but simply as "and 258 other Indian soldiers" or "and 272 other Indian soldiers." Kerr added that the commission knew their identities and had launched a project to find ways to publicize them both in India and in Britain. To date (August 2025) this has not been done and there are no deadlines or ongoing efforts to do so.

The site is situated amongst piles of debris from surrounding open gravel and sand extraction pits. There is a concrete barrier preventing spoil spilling onto the site. The CWGC abandoned the site to the elements in the early 2000's.

All 69 panels were photographed for posterity by a private individual and are available online for public use..

The CWGC has no plans currently to renovate this or any other war grave or memorial site in the country.

== Burials ==
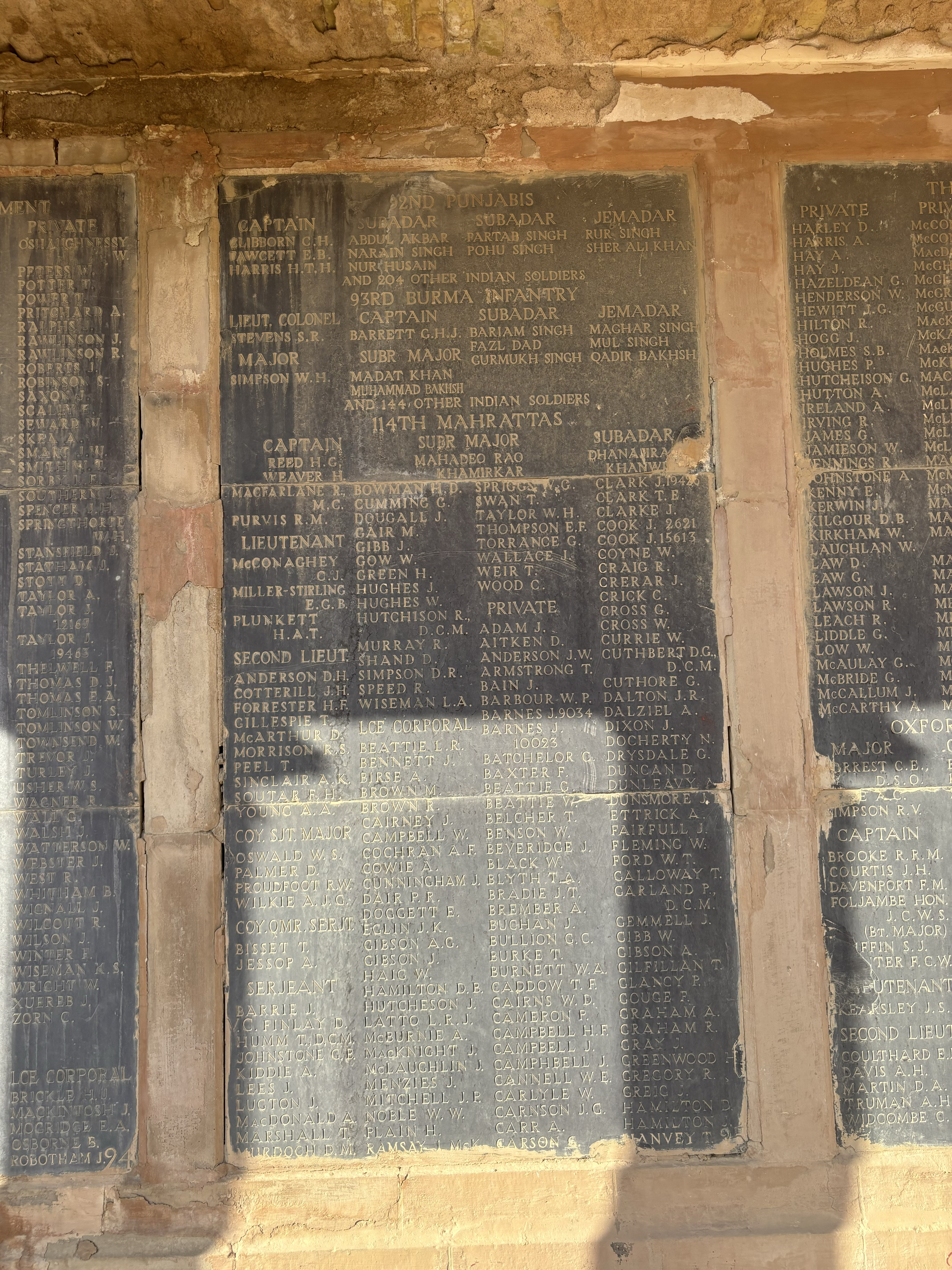
The 25th panel in memory of Sgt. David Finlay VC

There are five Victoria Cross ranking British officers listed on the Basra Memorial:

- VC, DSO & Bar, MC George Stuart Henderson (5 December 1893 – 24 July 1920) was a British Army officer and a Scottish recipient of the Victoria Cross, the highest award for gallantry in the face of the enemy that can be awarded to British and Commonwealth forces. Panel 31
- VC614 David Finlay BORN 25 January 1893 DIED 21 January 1916 AGE 22 VC Won 9 May 1915 AGE 22 Place VC Won Rue du Bois Aubers Ridge France War Campaign First World War 1915 Panel 25
- VC695 James Henry Fynn BORN 24 November 1893 DIED 30 March 1917 AGE 23 VC Won 9 April 1916 AGE 22 Place VC Won Sanna-I-Yat Mesopotamia now Iraq War Campaign First World War 1916 Panel 17
- VC699 Charles Henry Cowley BORN 21 February 1872 DIED 25 April 1916 AGE 44 VC Won 24–25 April 1916 AGE 44 Place VC Won River Tigris Magasis near Kut al-Amara Mesopotamia now Iraq Panel 1
- VC700 Humphrey Osbaldston Brooke Firman BORN 24 November 1886 DIED 25 April 1916 AGE 30 VC Won 24–25 April 1916 AGE 30 Place VC Won River Tigris Magasis near Kut al-Amara Mesopotamia Panel 1

Others include:

- Naik Lal Khan 67th Punjabis died on 28 April 1916 buried or commemorated Panel 47, 66 from Bhagwal.

== See also ==
- Amara War Cemetery
- Basra War Cemetery
- Friends of Basra War Cemetery
- Mesopotamia Campaign
- Memorials to Valour
