= Humphrey Firman =

Humphrey Osbaldston Brooke Firman
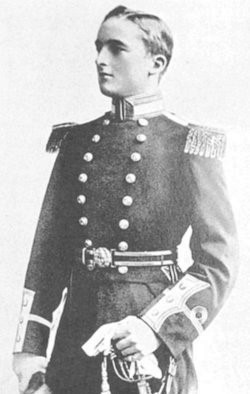
- Firman when a sub-lieutenant
- Born: 24 November 1886; South Kensington, London
- Died: 24 April 1916 (aged 29) †; Kut-el-Amara, Mesopotamia
- Military career
- Allegiance: United Kingdom
- Branch: Royal Navy
- Rank: Lieutenant
- Units: SS Julnar
- Conflicts: World War I: Siege of Kut †
- Awards: Victoria Cross

Humphrey Osbaldston Brooke Firman VC (24 November 1886 – 24 April 1916) was an English recipient of the Victoria Cross, the highest and most prestigious award for gallantry in the face of the enemy that can be awarded to British and Commonwealth forces.

Firman was born at South Kensington in 1886 to Humphrey Brooke Firman, J.P. (of Gateforth, Selby, Yorkshire and New Malden, Surrey) and Florence Adelaide (née Cumming). He joined the Royal Navy as a cadet on 15 May 1901 and, as midshipman and sub-lieutenant, served on HMS Glory on the China Station, in the battleships HMS Albion and HMS Illustrious in the Channel Fleet, and in the Royal Yacht Victoria and Albert. Promoted to Lieutenant in 1908, he saw service in the Persian Gulf and off the Horn of Africa. During the First World War he was killed in action on the night of 24 April 1916 in Mesopotamia in an attempt to resupply the forces trapped in the Siege of Kut, at the age of 29. He was posthumously awarded the Victoria Cross for his deeds, as was a fellow naval officer, Lieutenant Commander Charles Cowley R.N.V.R.

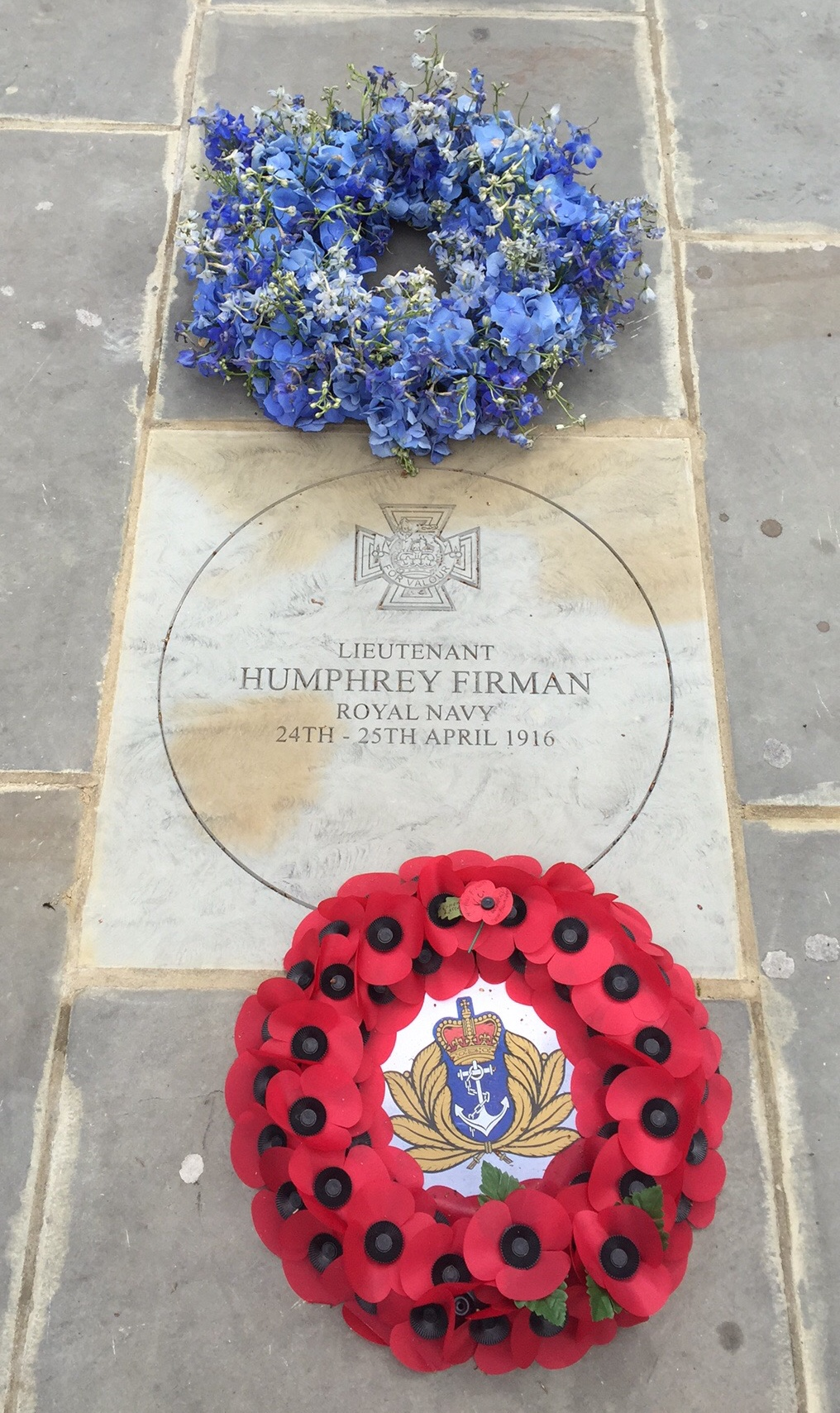
Memorial slab to Humphrey Firman in the pavement outside South Kensington tube station

== Citation ==
The General Officer Commanding, Indian Expeditionary Force "D", reported on this attempt in the following words:- " At 8 p.m. on April 24th, 1916, with a crew from the Royal Navy under Lieut. Firman, R.N., assisted by Lieut. Comdr. Cowley, R.N.V.R., the Julnar , carrying 270 tons of supplies, left Falahiyah in an attempt to reach Kut. Her departure was covered by all artillery and machine gun fire that could be brought to bear, in the hope of distracting the enemy's attention. She was, however, discovered and shelled on her passage up the river. At 1 a.m. on the 25th, Gen. Townshend reported that she had not arrived, and that at midnight a burst of heavy firing had been heard at Magasis, some 9 miles from Kut by river, which had suddenly ceased. There could be but little doubt that the enterprise had failed, and the next day the Air Service reported the " Julnar " in the hands of the Turks at Magasis. The leaders of this brave attempt, Lieut. H.O.B. Firman, R.N., and his assistant, Lieut. Comdr. C.H. Cowley, R.N.V.R. – the latter of whom throughout the campaign in Mesopotamia performed magnificent service in command of the "Mejidieh" – have been reported by the Turks to have been killed; the remainder of the gallant crew, including five wounded, are prisoners of war. Knowing well the chances against them, all the gallant officers and men who manned the 'Julnar' for the occasion were volunteers. I trust that the services in this connection of Lieut. H.O.B. Firman, R.N., and Lieut. Comdr. C.H. Cowley, R.N.V.R., his assistant, both of whom were unfortunately killed, may be recognised by the posthumous grant of some suitable honour." The account of the award is preceded by the following paragraph:- "The King has been graciously pleased to approve of the posthumous grant of the Victoria Cross to the undermentioned officers in recognition of their conspicuous gallantry in an attempt to re-provision the force besieged in Kut-el-Amara.

— The London Gazette, 2 February 1917

== Legacy ==
In New Malden, Surrey, a plaque bearing his name was unveiled on the war memorial in April 2008, while Firman Close is named after him. A stone slab memorial to Firman is set into the pavement on the south side of South Kensington tube station and was unveiled on 25 April 2016. He is commemorated on the Basra Memorial.

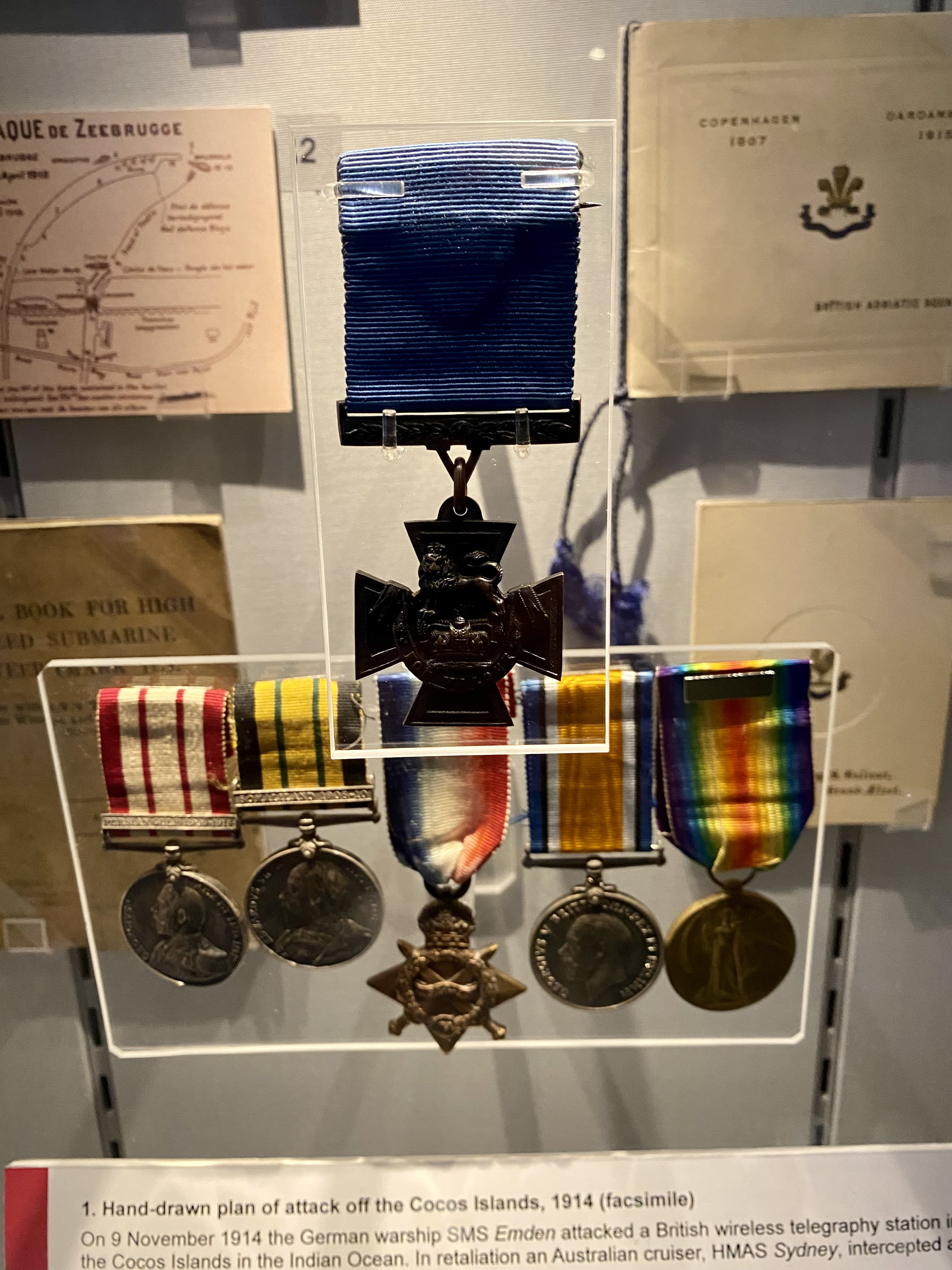
Firman’s medals on display at York Castle Museum

His Victoria Cross is held at the York Castle Museum.
