= Amara War Cemetery =

WWI CWGC cemetery in Iraq

Coordinates: 31.8454°N 47.1606°E

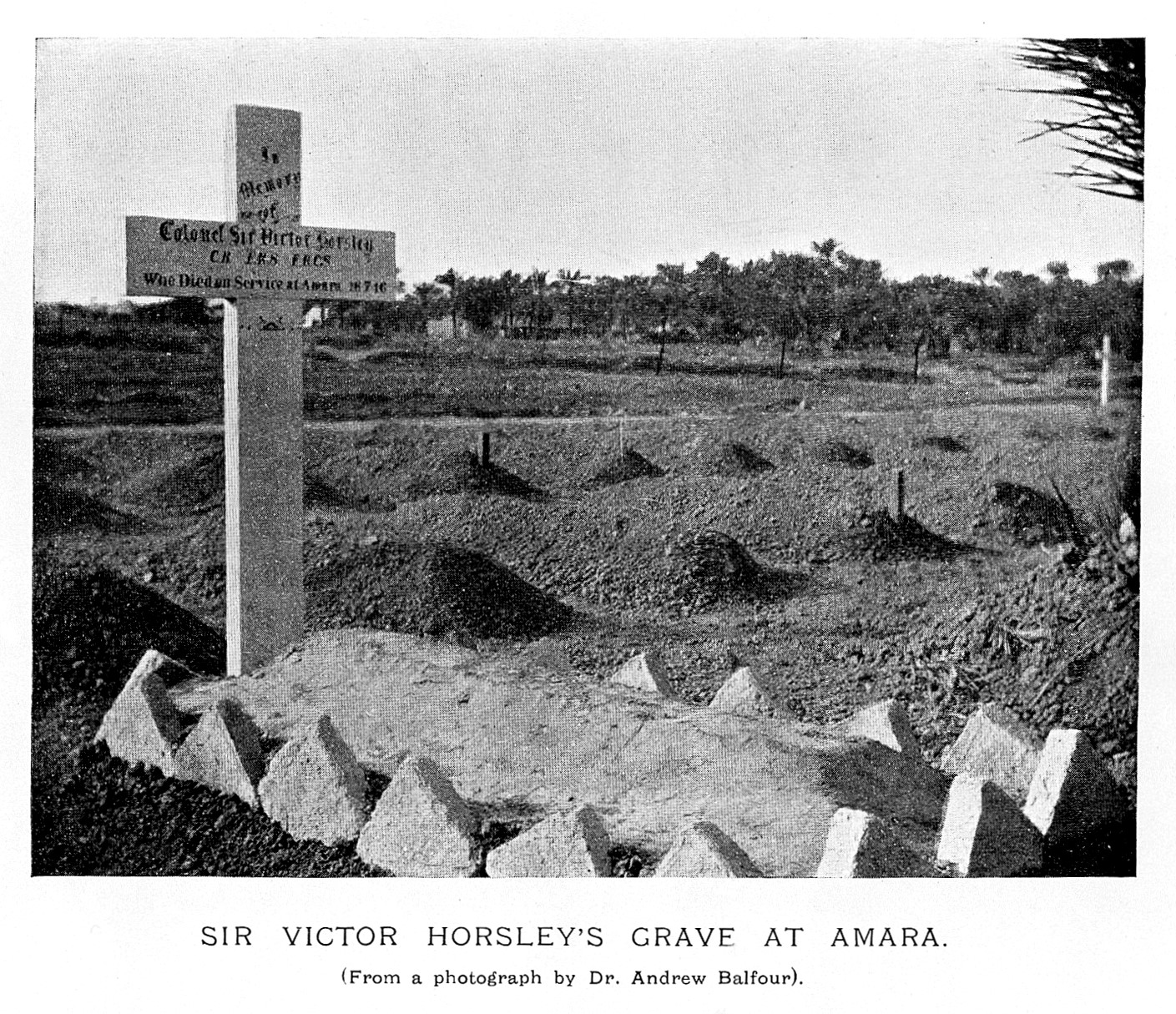
Grave of Sir Victor Horsley at Amara.

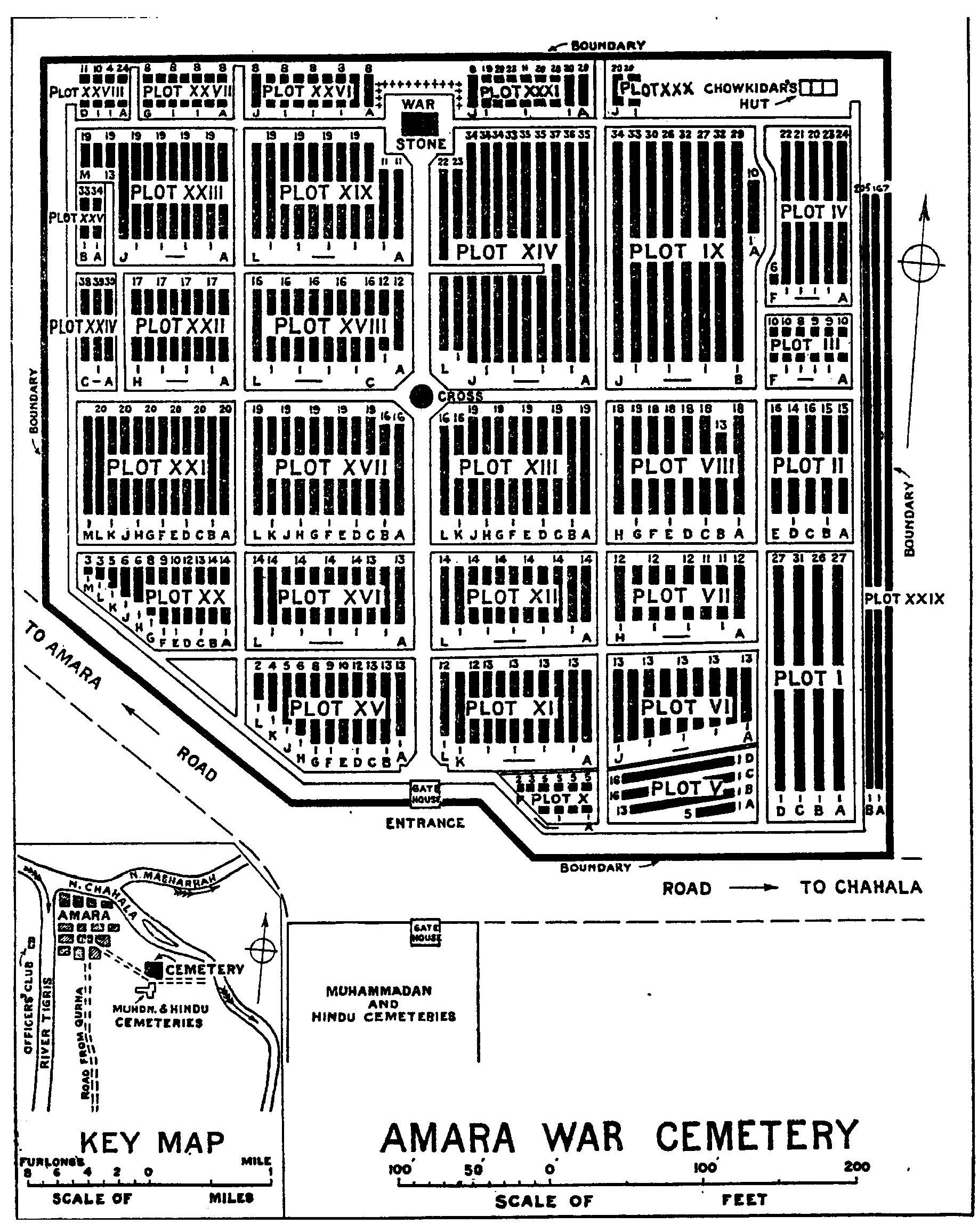
Plan of the cemetery as originally laid out.

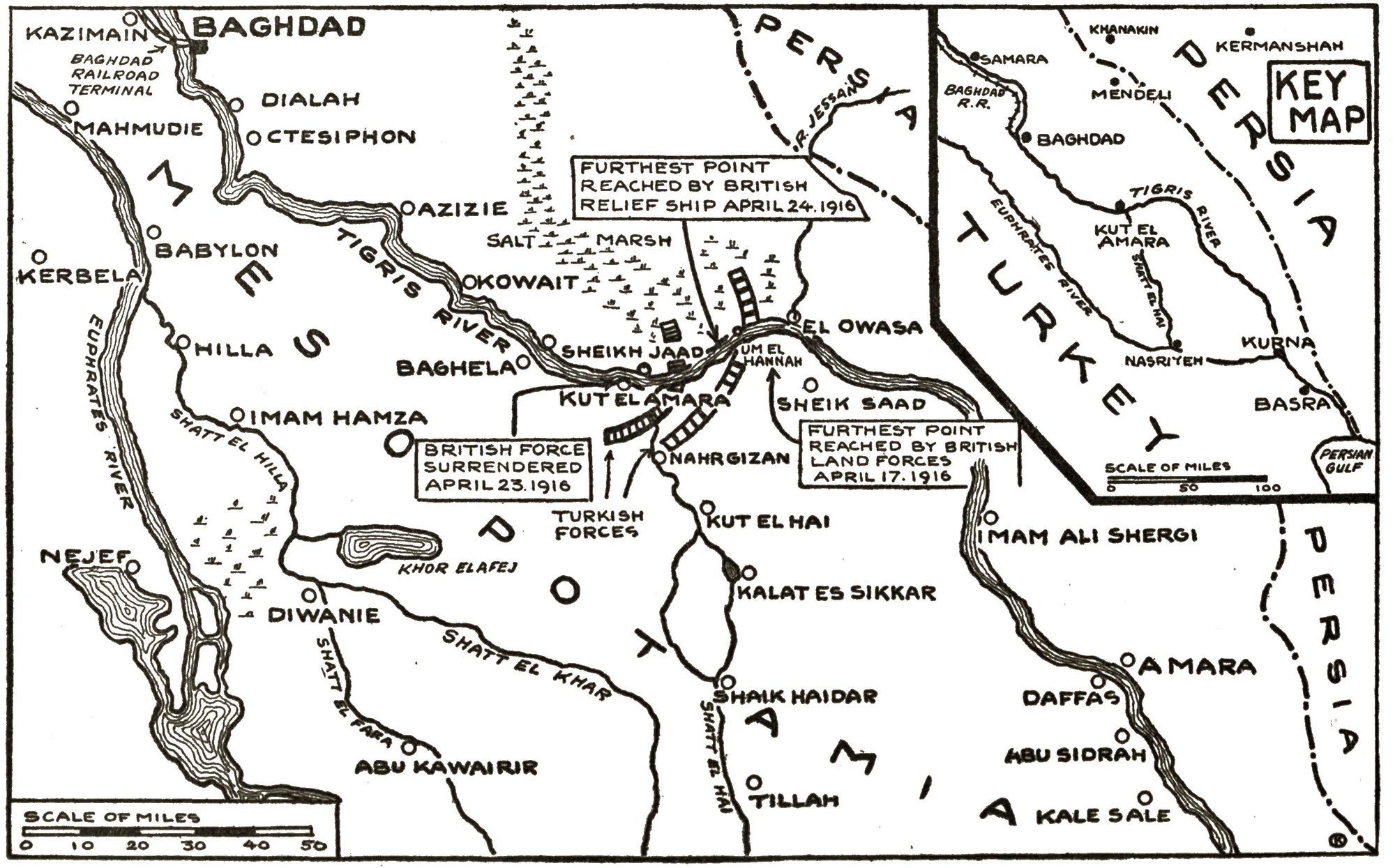
Amara (bottom right) on a map dating from the First World War.

The Amara War Cemetery is a First World War British military cemetery in Amara, now known as Amarah, southern Iraq, that is the responsibility of the Commonwealth War Graves Commission (CWGC). It contains more than 4,600 graves including three recipients of the Victoria Cross but is now in poor condition as the CWGC have not been able to work in Iraq since 1991.

== Location ==
The cemetery is located immediately to the south of one of the branches of the River Tigris where it splits at Amarah in an area that was seized by the Mesopotamian Expeditionary Force during the First World War. Amarah became a major hospital centre with medical detachments on both sides of the river and seven general hospitals. The cemetery is now the responsibility of the Commonwealth War Graves Commission.

== Burials ==
The cemetery contains 4,621 burials from the First World War, of which more than 3,000 were interred after the end of the war. Only 3,696 of the dead have been identified. In 1933, the grave headstones were removed after it was found that they were being damaged by salts in the soil and a memorial wall erected instead with the names of the dead engraved upon plaques.

Graves at Amara include the surgeon Sir Victor Horsley, and Victoria Cross recipients Sidney William Ware, Edgar Christopher Cookson, and Edward Elers Delaval Henderson. Captain Alfred Wallace Harvey of the Royal Army Medical Corps, who was shot by a sentry from his own side, is also buried at Amara.

Immediately to the south of the British cemetery is the Amara (Left Bank) Indian War Cemetery which contains the graves of more than 5,000 Indian soldiers killed during the Mesopotamian campaign.

== Condition ==
In 2003, the BBC reported that the cemetery was in the care of Mr Hasan Ahtif Mousa who said that he took the keeper's job in 1962 and had maintained the cemetery despite threats from Ba'ath Party officials. He said he had not been paid since 1991 but received support from Baroness Nicholson of Winterbourne, founder of the charity AMAR. Recently due to the efforts of the then British Embassy Defense Attache Brigadier Adam McCrae the CWGC now pays Mr Mousa.

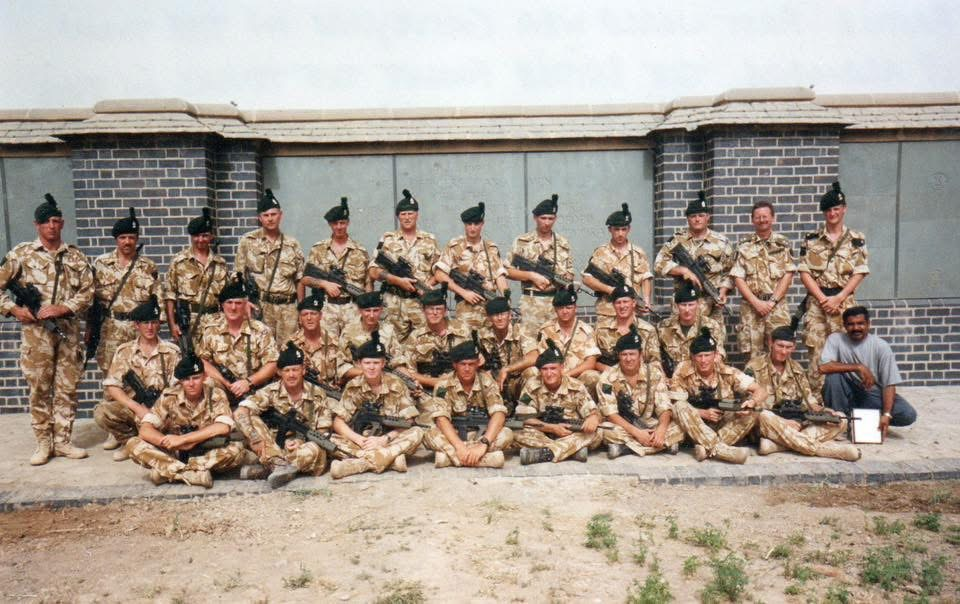
British Army at Amara 2003

In 2014, commenting on the run-down condition of the cemetery, Iraqi sources urged that the cemetery be restored after neglect that they blamed on the local government and the fact that the cemetery was not recognised as part of Iraq's heritage. Commentators argued that it was an important site in the history of the local area and a monument to the resistance of local tribesmen to British occupation and so should be preserved.

The original gatehouse for the British cemetery was demolished on the orders of the CWGC country manager in 1998. The Cross of Sacrifice was destroyed by Militants in 2004, along with the Stone of Remembrance, the gatehouse and memorials at the Indian Army cemetery were destroyed the same time. The remnants of these features remain on the site in the hope of eventual renovation. Only the pedestal of the Cross remains and, amazingly the Bronze sword, which was retained by the caretaker and is the last remaining original one in Iraq.

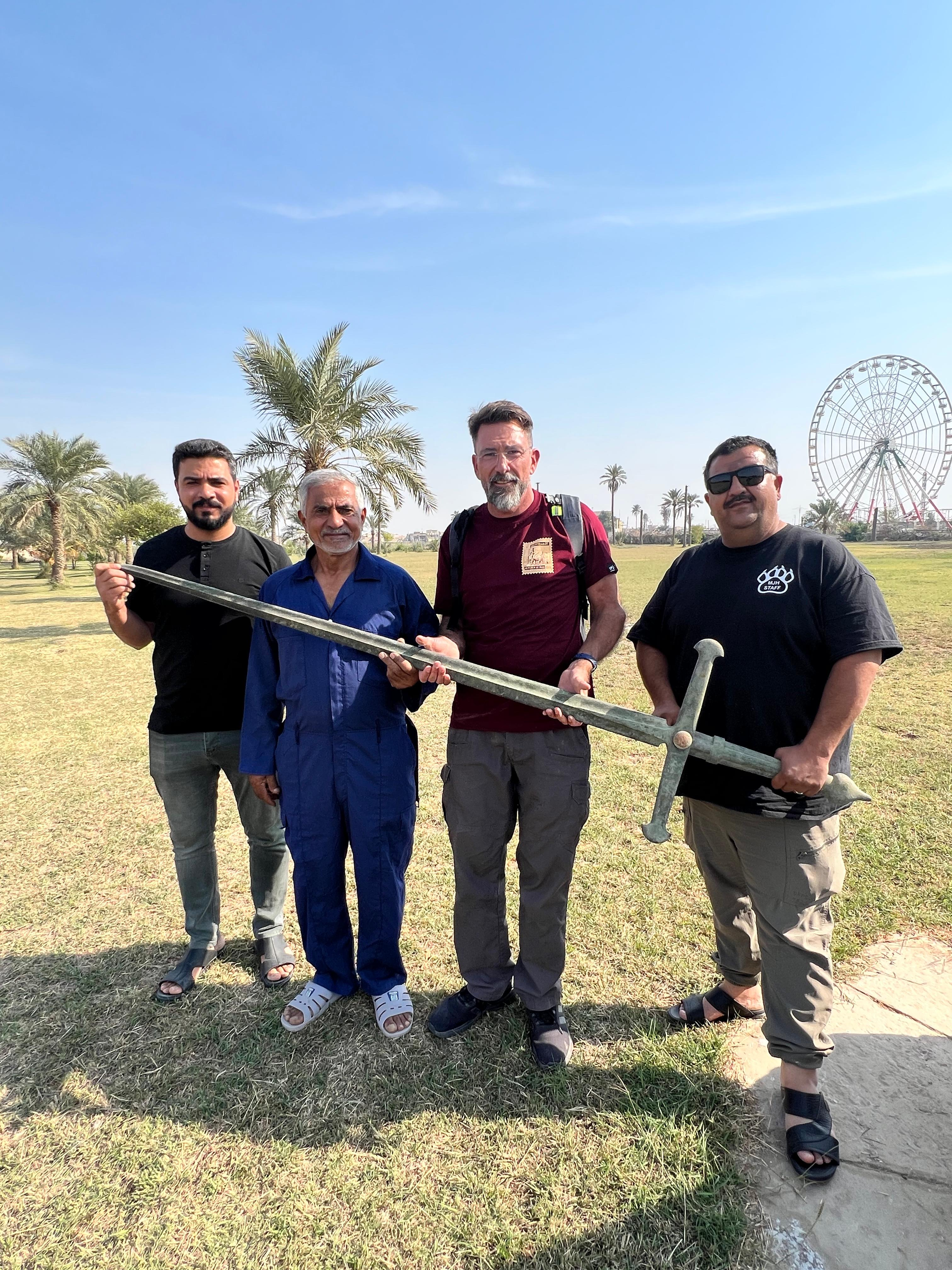
Mr. Mousa (second from left) and his son (left) with the original bronze Sword of Sacrifice which he saved from destruction. Photo 2025

The CWGC formally left Iraq in 1990 and have not as of 2026 returned to manage and renovate these sites despite the stable political and security situation in the country.

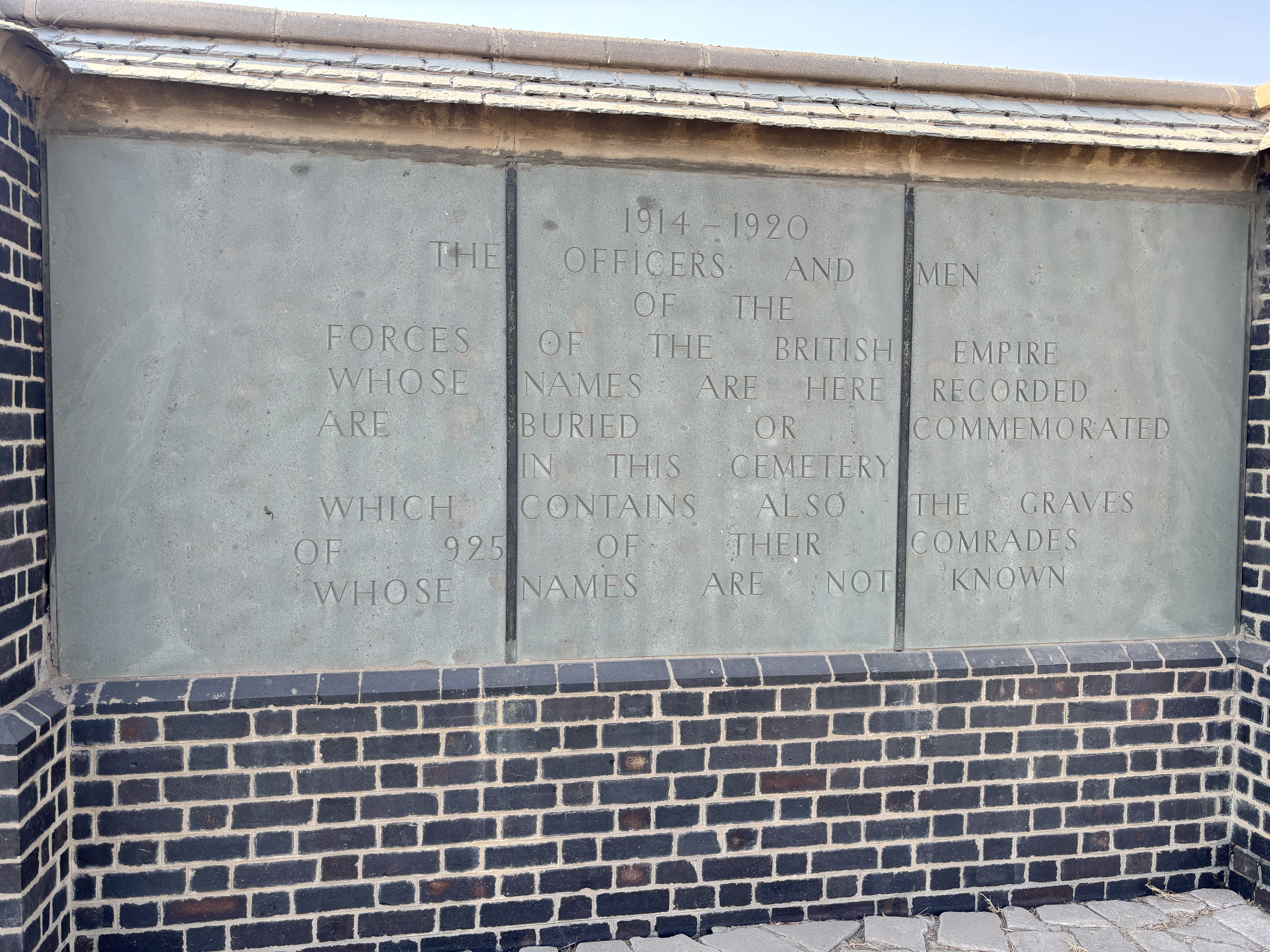
Amara Memorial Wall 2025

Following a renovation of the memorial wall in 2022 by Mr Hasan Ahtif Mousa and his family all the memorial panels are in place and can be seen at Commonwealth War Graves in Iraq, a private initiative to document with video and photography all the CWGC site in Iraq. Amara British War Cemetery is now the best kept of all the WW1 cemeteries or monuments in Iraq.

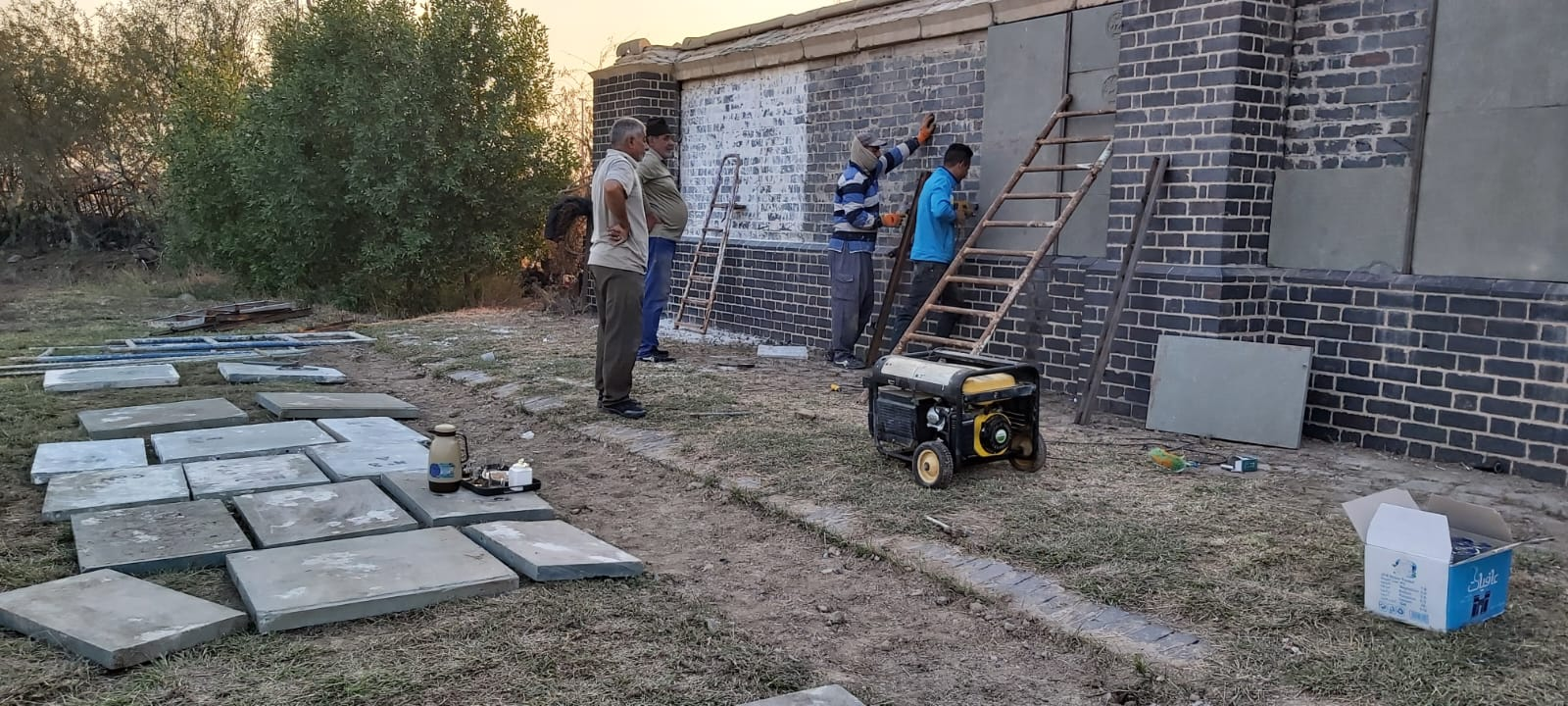
2022 Renovation of Memorial Wall by the Guardian of the site Mr Mousa

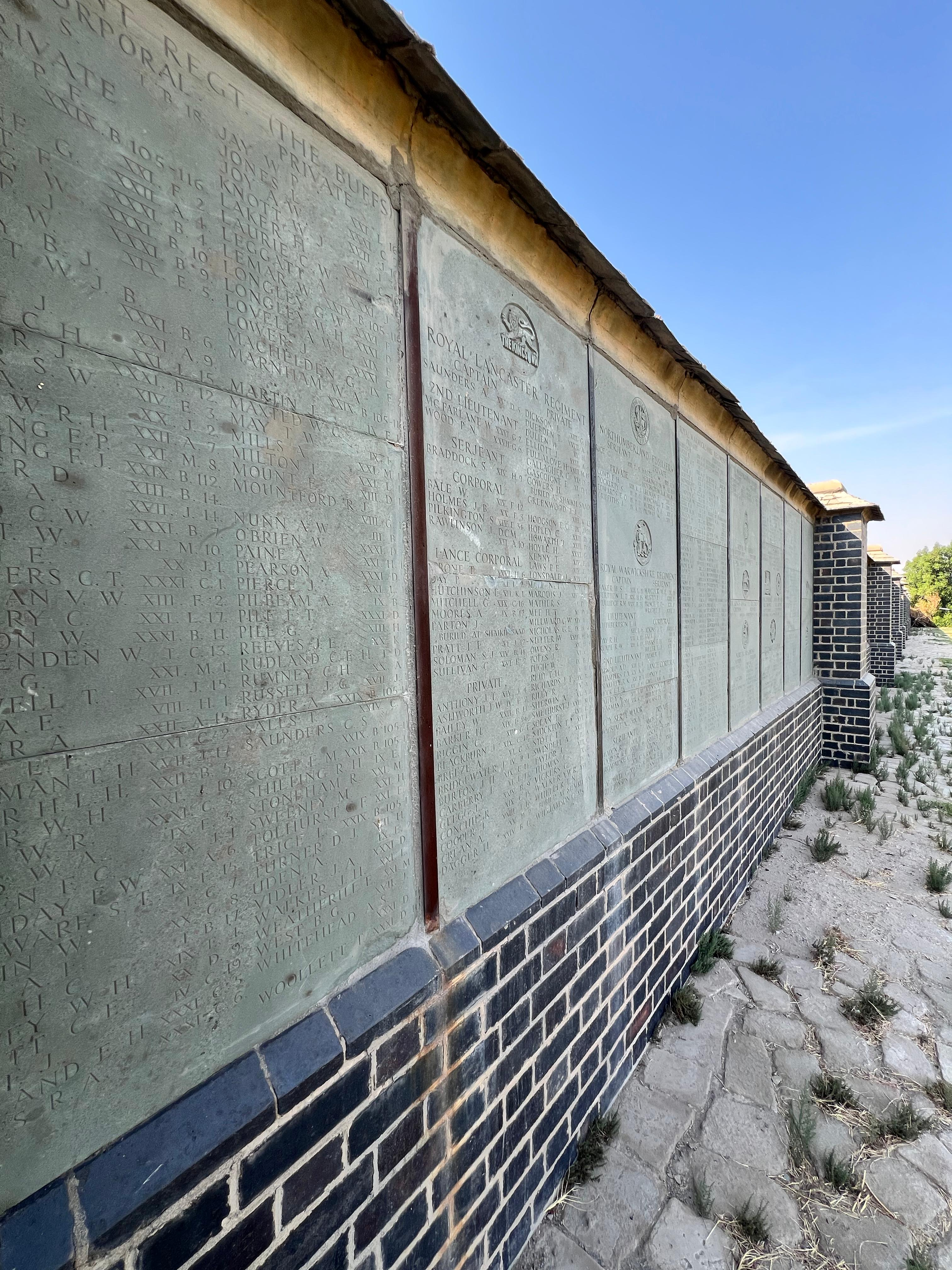
Panels at Amara British Cemetery 2025

The only remaining memorial to a British casualty of Operation Telic left in Iraq is at Amara Cemetery.

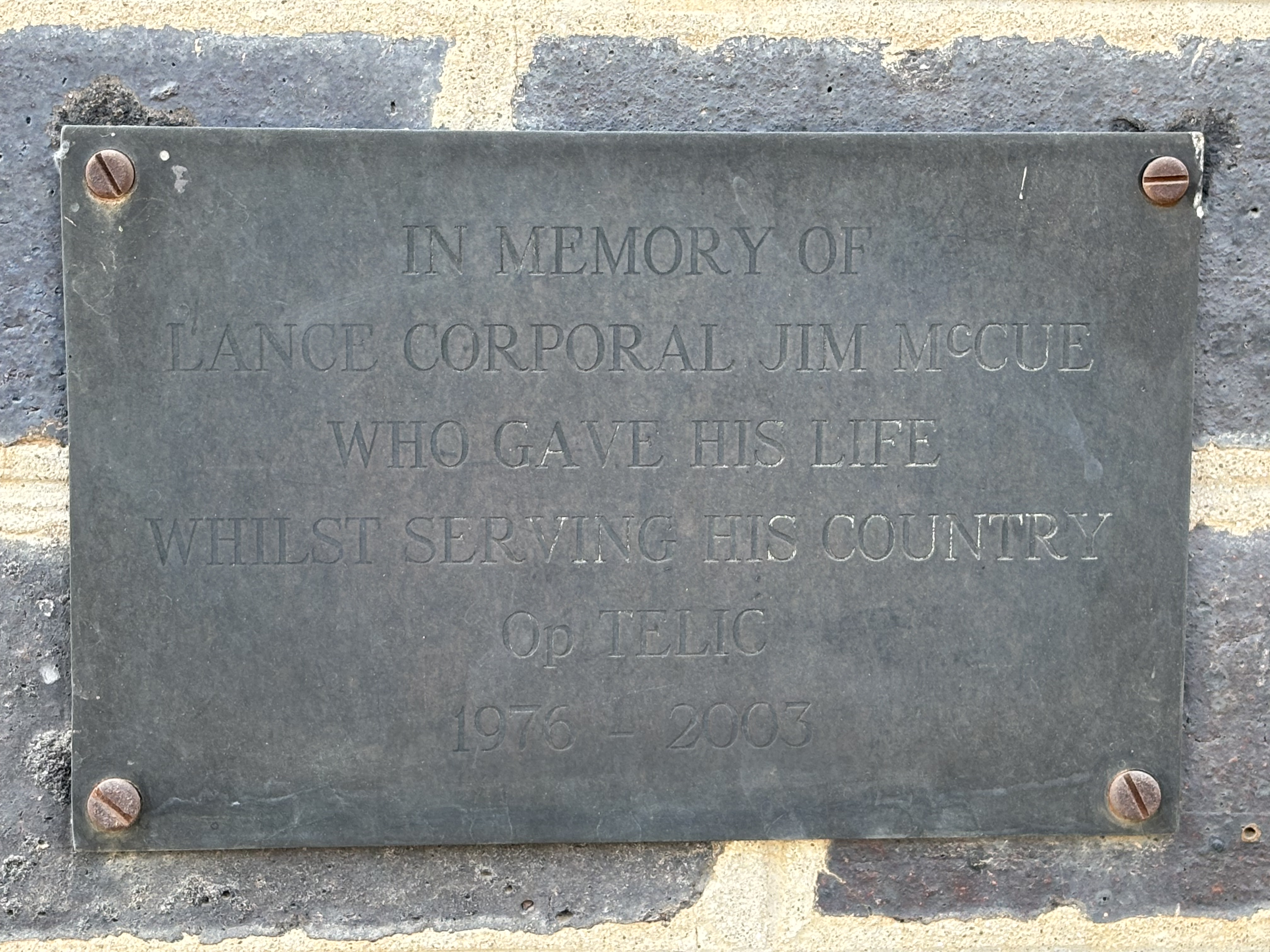
Memorial added to the Amara Wall for Lance Corporal Jim McCue Photo 2025

== See also ==
- Basra Memorial
- Basra War Cemetery
