= SS Julnar =

Julnar was a 900-ton, 210-foot-long (64 m) river steamer built in 1908 by E. Rennie and Co. of Greenwich, London, for the Euphrates and Tigris Steam Navigation Company.

The ship, modified and renamed HMS Julnar, was sunk in 1916 while attempting to steam upriver past Ottoman guns to re-supply British forces under siege in Kut-al-Amara during the Mesopotamian Campaign. During this action, the ship was commanded by Lieutenant Humphrey Firman R.N., assisted by Lieutenant Commander Charles Cowley R.N.V.R., both of whom were posthumously awarded the Victoria Cross.
