= American Indian Religious Freedom Act =

United States Law protecting Native Americans' religions and cultures

- Long title: Joint resolution American Indians Religious Freedom
- Acronyms (colloquial): AIRFA
- Enacted by: the 95th United States Congress

Citations
- Public law: 95-341
- Statutes at Large: 92 Stat. 469

Codification
- Titles amended: 42 U.S.C.: Public Health and Social Welfare
- U.S.C. sections created: 42 U.S.C. ch. 21, subch. I §§ 1996 & 1996a

Legislative history
- Introduced in the Senate as S.J.Res. 102 by James Abourezk (D-SD) on December 15, 1977; Committee consideration by Senate Indian Affairs; Passed the Senate on April 3, 1978; Passed the House on July 18, 1978 (in lieu of H.J.Res. 738, 337–81) with amendment; Senate agreed to House amendment on July 27, 1978 (); Signed into law by President Jimmy Carter on August 11, 1978

The American Indian Religious Freedom Act, Public Law No. 95–341, 92 Stat. 469 (Aug. 11, 1978) (commonly abbreviated to AIRFA), codified at 42 U.S.C. § 1996, is a United States federal law, enacted by joint resolution of the Congress in 1978. Prior to the act, many aspects of Native American religions and cultures had been prohibited by law.

The law was enacted to return basic civil liberties to American Indians, Eskimos, Aleuts, and Native Hawaiians, and to allow them to practice, protect and preserve their inherent right of freedom to believe, express, and exercise their traditional religious rites, spiritual and cultural practices. These rights include, but are not limited to, access to sacred sites, freedom to worship through traditional ceremonial rites, and the possession and use of objects traditionally considered sacred by their respective cultures.

The Act requires policies of all governmental agencies to eliminate interference with the free exercise of Native American religions, based upon the First Amendment to the United States Constitution, and to accommodate access to, and use of, Native American religious sites to the extent that the use is practicable and is consistent with an agency's essential functions. It also acknowledges the prior violation of that right.

== Passage ==
American Indian religious practices have often been prohibited by existing federal laws and government policies. There have been three general areas of conflict.

The passages of the Indian Removal Act (1830) and General Allotment Act (1887) resulted in the forced relocation and displacement of hundreds of tribes from their traditional homelands. Most of the people of the Five Civilized Tribes of the southeastern United States were forced into the Central Plains of the United States, and the forced assimilation of Native American families into agricultural settler societies and, later, urban communities left Native Americans without access to the sacred sites where they and their ancestors had traditionally held their religious ceremonies. Native American spiritual culture is tied to place, making some ceremonies difficult or impossible to practice when removed from their original context. At sites that are seen as particularly holy, only certain people are allowed to enter, and protocols are observed as to what behaviors must be observed, or prohibited, at these locations. These beliefs can conflict with the idea that American public lands now exist for the recreational use of all the American people.

The second conflict was the possession by tribal members of ceremonial items considered sacred and in their cultures and an integral part of their ceremonies that are nonetheless restricted under United States law. Eagle feathers or bones are considered necessary for certain ceremonies, yet the birds are protected as a threatened species. The importance of eagle feathers and bones for use in traditional religious ceremonies has been repeatedly cited in cases involving Indian claims on hunting and fishing rights, with petitions being made for exceptions to occasionally hunt for eagles. The Native American Church uses peyote as a sacrament. However, peyote is a legally restricted substance.

The third general area of conflict was an issue of government interference into the sphere of religion. Despite the American laws governing the separation of church and state, Native Americans were not being treated equally under the law, and their sacred ceremonies were often subject to interference from overzealous government officials or curious onlookers.

The act acknowledged prior federal infringement on the rights of American Indians to freedom of religion, and that their First Amendment right of "free exercise" of religion had been denied.

President Jimmy Carter said, in a statement about the AIRFA:

In the past, Government agencies and departments have on occasion denied Native Americans access to particular sites and interfered with religious practices and customs where such use conflicted with Federal regulations. In many instances, the Federal officials responsible for the enforcement of these regulations were unaware of the nature of traditional native religious practices and, consequently, of the degree to which their agencies interfered with such practices.

This legislation seeks to remedy this situation.

Section 2 of the AIRFA directs federal agencies to consult with American Indian spiritual leaders to determine appropriate procedures to protect the inherent rights of American Indians, as laid out it the act.

== Original text ==
Public Law 95-341
95th Congress

Joint Resolution
American Indian Religious Freedom.

Whereas the freedom of religion for all people is an inherent right, fundamental to the democratic structure of the United States and is guaranteed by the First Amendment of the United States Constitution;

Whereas the United States has traditionally rejected the concept of a government denying individuals the right to practice their religion, and as a result, has benefited from a rich variety of religious heritages in this country;

Whereas the religious practices of the American Indian (as well as Native Alaskan and Hawaiian) are an integral part of their culture, tradition, and heritage, such practices forming the basis of Indian identity and value systems;

Whereas the traditional American Indian religions as an integral part of Indian life, are indispensable and irreplaceable;

Whereas the lack of a clear, comprehensive, and consistent Federal policy has often resulted in the abridgment of religious freedom for traditional American Indians;

Whereas such religious infringements result from the lack of knowledge of the insensitive and inflexible enforcement of Federal policies and regulations premised on a variety of laws;

Whereas such laws were designed for such worthwhile purposes as conservation and preservation of natural species and resources but were never intended to relate to Indian religious practices and, there, were passed without consideration of their effect on traditional American Indian religions;

Whereas such laws and policies often deny American Indians access to sacred sites required in their religions, including cemeteries;

Whereas such laws at times prohibit the use and possession of sacred objects necessary to the exercise of religious rites and ceremonies;

Whereas traditional American Indian ceremonies have been intruded upon, interfered with, and in a few instances banned;

Now, therefore, be it Resolved by the Senate and the House of Representatives of the United States of America in Congress Assembled, That henceforth it shall be the policy of the United States to protect and preserve for American Indians their inherent right of freedom to believe, express, and exercise the traditional religions of the American Indian, Eskimo, Aleut, and Native Hawaiians, including but not limited to access to sites, use and possession of sacred objects, and the freedom to worship through ceremonials and traditional rites.

SEC. 2. The President shall direct that various Federal departments, agencies, and other instrumentalities responsible for the administering relevant laws to evaluate their policies and procedures in consultation with Native traditional religious leaders in order to determine appropriate changes necessary to protect and preserve Native American religious cultural rights and practices. Twelve months after approval of this resolution, the President shall report back to Congress the results of his evaluation, including any changes which were made in administrative policies and procedures, and any recommendations he may have for legislative action.

Approved August 11, 1978.

== Effects ==
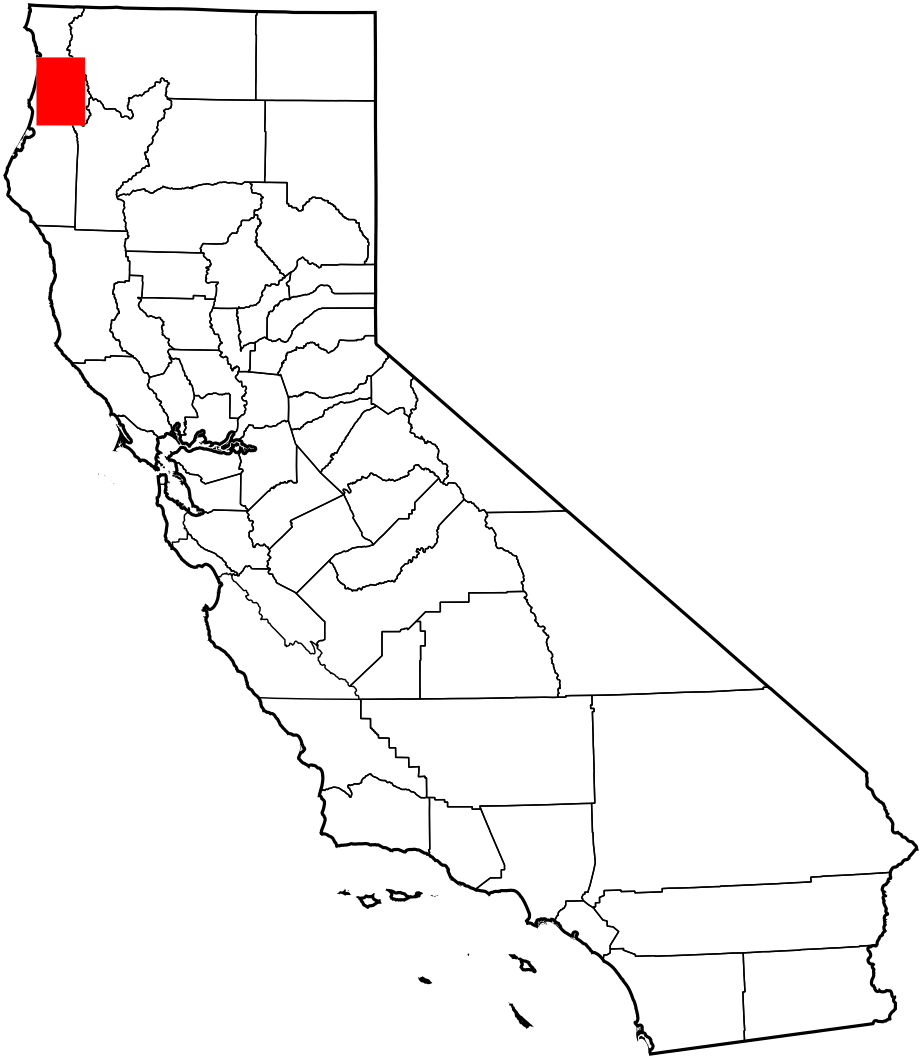
The traditional homeland of the Yurok, Karok, Tolowa, and Hupa tribes exists in an area that includes the Six Rivers National Forest and the Klamath National Forest.

Native American tribes had traditionally been closely associated with their lands, and their religious practices and beliefs were based in specific geographic areas. Lyng v. Northwest Indian Cemetery Protective Association (1988) is a landmark case in the Supreme Court's decisions affecting Native American religion under the AIRFA. The bureaucratic decisions to alter land sites implemented by the Court on this case, constitute invasions of tribal self-understanding. This case helped to prove that the dissipation of tribal identity is the consequence of land desecration. The fact that land desecration is allowed to happen so easily is a result of the absence of enforcement and stability within the terms of the American Indian Religious Freedom Act.

The Forest Service wanted to build a road that went directly through the sacred lands of the Yurok, Tolowa, and Karok tribes. Under Lyng v. Northwest Indian Cemetery Protective Association, in 1988 the tribe filed suit against the government for denying their rights to religious freedom under the first amendment by ruling in favor of the United States Forest Service. Tribal leaders testified that the road would destroy parts of the pristine mountains and high country that the tribes considered sacred and essential to their religious beliefs and practices. They expressed their concerns in court, outlining the burden imposed upon their religious freedom. However, the court determined that, because the tribes had not stated a requisite legal burden on those rights, that they could not receive protection under the AIRFA.

The Theodoratus Report was a comprehensive study prompted by the American Indian Religious Freedom Act during Lyng v. Northwest Indian Cemetery Protective Ass'n (1988) and conducted by the United States Forest Service in order to evaluate policies and procedures to protect Native American religious cultural rights and practices. This study was done in order to provide definitive information on the effects of the Forest Service's actions on Native American religious culture in high country. This study was completed in April 1979 and was titled Cultural Resources of the Chimney Rock Section, Gasquet-Orleans Road, Six Rivers National Forest and was written by Dr. Dorothea J. Theodoratus, Dr. Joseph L. Chartkoff, and Ms. Kerry K. Chartkoff. It was a compilation of ethnographic, archaeological and historical data that identified the culture contained in the area that the Forest Service proposed to be the site of the Chimney Rock Section of the Gasquet-Orleans Road. This culture belonged to the Yurok, Karok, and Tolowa peoples.

In its final recommendations, the report criticizes the Forest Service for ignorance of the physical and historical significance and religious importance of the site proposed for road construction. The report warned the Forest Service against the ruinous impact of road construction, and its logging and mining operations. It said the philosophy that high country is solely a natural resource to be managed and improved was at fault. The report traced the long history of this site as sacred to succeeding cultures of indigenous peoples, whose connection could be documented from prehistory. The report stated that the only appropriate management of such land should be its preservation in a natural state.

The Theodoratus Report, in effect, established a guideline by which the Forest Service would be able to understand the importance of land to Native American culture. Because they had commissioned the report and recognized its significance they conformed with the AIRFA in the Lyng case, but it was the Theodoratus Report, not the AIRFA, that compelled the Forest Service to follow the report's collection of data on the religious significance of the high country. However, nothing within the AIRFA prevented the Forest Service from ignoring the warning of its own commissioned report concerning the destruction of the Yurok, Karok, and Tolowa religious traditions.

This case's decision states that tribes have no First Amendment right of religious freedom that can halt federal land management of public lands that contain sacred tribal spaces. This decision became the standing precedent that threatened the survival of any traditional Native American community whose sacred lands, by the fault of the government's history of Indian affairs, are on public land rather than on reservations. The Supreme Court advocated its decision to refuse the countenance of the religious valuation of land as representing its responsibility towards enforcing the First Amendment rights of the Native American plaintiff.

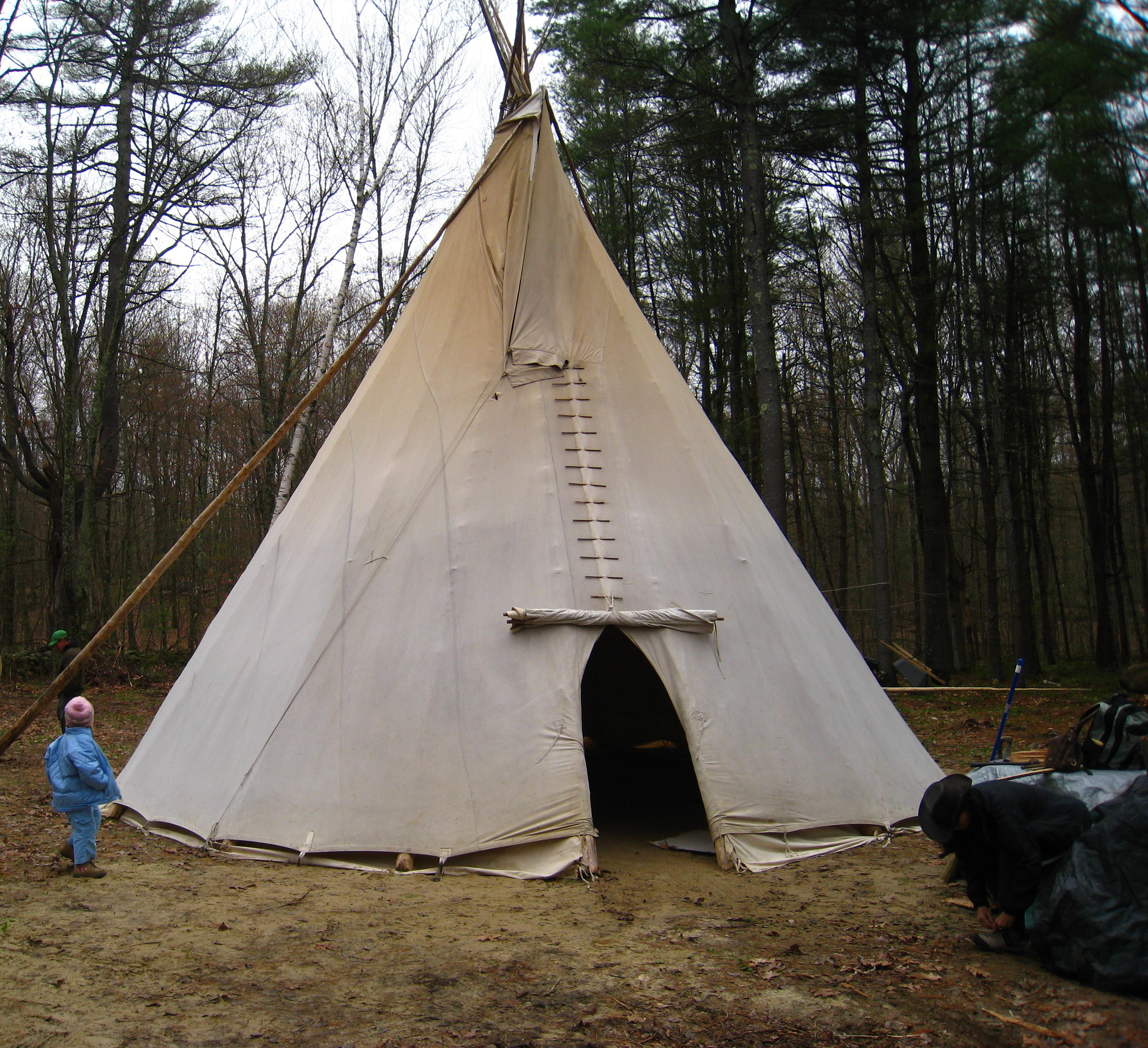
A peyote ceremony tipi used by members of the Native American Church

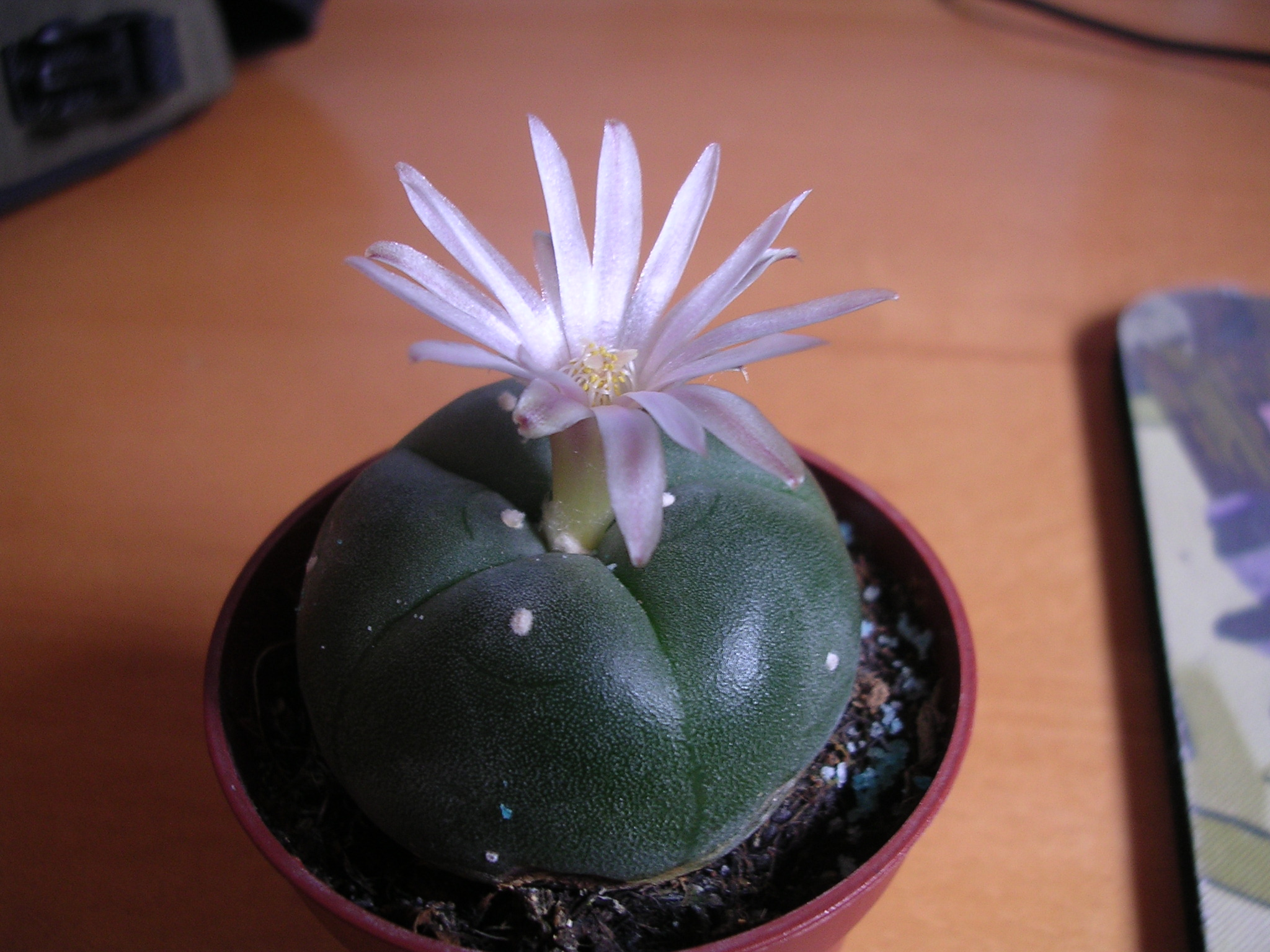
Peyote is illegal in the United States and is classified as a Schedule One Drug.

In Employment Division v. Smith (1990), the Court ruled against the Native American Church and its members' use of Peyote for religious ceremonies. Alfred Smith, a Native American who had been born on the Klamath Reservation in Oregon, was fired from his job at an agency in Roseburg, Oregon, that helped develop services for Native American clientele. His termination was based on his attendance at ceremonies of the Native American Church, which uses peyote as a sacrament. Because it is a restricted substance under drug laws, Smith was fired for his use of it. Another member of the N.A.C. was also fired from the agency for the same reason. When denied unemployment compensation, Smith and his co-worker challenged the grounds of their terminations. Smith took his case to the Oregon courts, which ruled in his favor of protected use of peyote under the free exercise clause of AIRFA.

The U.S. Supreme Court reviewed the case, and overturned the Oregon court ruling. The Supreme Court stated that they could in fact be denied unemployment benefits because by using peyote they were in violation of state criminal law. The Smith decision prompted the development of the Native American Religious Freedom Project which involved and concerned almost every Native American tribe in the country. In 1993, the Religious Freedom Restoration Act was passed. By 1994, the American Indian Religious Freedom Act Amendments were passed as Public Law 103–344. The Amendments provided legislative protection for religious practices of the Native American Church.

== Criticism ==
The major criticism of the American Indian Religious Freedom Act was its inability to enforce its provisions, therefore its inability to provide religious freedom without condition. The act served as more of a joint resolution than an actual law. Its failure to protect certain sacred sites proved detrimental to Native American cultures and religions as a whole.

The Lyng v. Northwest Indian Cemetery Association decision represented a unique convergence of religion, law, and land, and confirmed the American Indian Religious Freedom Act as a hollow excess of words. The Supreme Court itself declared that the legislation had no firm grasp on what it stood for. There was nothing in the Act that mandated changes pursuant to the review process prior to its amendment in 1994. The case illustrates that compliance with the review procedure of the AIRFA does not provide any assurance that judicial protections or substantive agency will be offered to Native American religious belief and practice, even if the serious endangerment to Native American religion from proposed government action is recognized within that review procedure. Some scholars have argued that the Supreme Court's interpretation is tantamount to a failure by the Court to ensure protection of the Constitution's First Amendment free exercise of religion clause for American Indian traditional religion practitioners.

== 1994 Amendments – full text ==
Due to the criticism of the AIRFA and its inability to enforce the provisions it outlined in 1978, on June 10, 1994, the House of Representatives Committee on Natural resources, and later the Subcommittee on Native American Affairs, met to bring about H.R. 4155 in order to provide for the management of federal lands in a way that does not frustrate the traditional religions and religious purposes of Native Americans. It was signed into law by President Bill Clinton.

In 1994, Congress passed H.R. 4230 to amend the American Indian Religious Freedom Act, in order to provide for protected use of peyote as a sacrament in traditional religious ceremonies. This was passed as Public Law No 103–344 on October 6, 1994, with full text as below.

H.R. 4230.

Be it enacted by the Senate and House of Representatives of the United States of America in Congress assembled,

SECTION 1. SHORT TITLE.

This Act may be cited as the "American Indian Religious Freedom Act Amendments of 1994".

SECTION 2. TRADITIONAL INDIAN RELIGIOUS USE OF THE PEYOTE SACRAMENT.

The Act of August 11, 1978 (42 U.S.C. 1996), commonly referred to as the "American Indian Religious Freedom Act", is amended by adding at the end thereof the following new section:

SECTION 3.

(a) The Congress finds and declares that –

(1) for many Indian people, the traditional ceremonial use of the peyote cactus as a religious sacrament has for centuries been integral to a way of life, and significant in perpetuating Indian tribes and cultures;

(2) since 1965, this ceremonial use of peyote by Indians has been protected by Federal regulation;

(3) while at least 28 States have enacted laws which are similar to, or are in conformance with, the Federal regulation which protects the ceremonial use of peyote by Indian religious practitioners, many States have not done so, and this lack of uniformity has created hardship for Indian people who participate in such religious ceremonies;

(4) the Supreme Court of the United States, in the case of Employment Division v. Smith, 494 U.S. 872 (1990), held that the First Amendment does not protect Indian practitioners who use peyote in Indian religious ceremonies, and also raised uncertainty whether this religious practice would be protected under the compelling of the State interest standard and

(5) the lack of adequate and clear legal protection for the religious use of peyote by Indians may serve to stigmatize and marginalize Indian tribes and cultures, and increase the risk that they will be exposed to discriminatory treatment in violation of the religious guarantees of the First Amendment of the Constitution.

(b)(1) Notwithstanding any other provision of the law, the use, possession, or transportation of peyote by an Indian who uses peyote in a traditional manner for bona fide ceremonial purposes in connection with the practice of a traditional Indian religion is lawful, and shall not be prohibited by the United States or by any State. No Indian shall be penalized or discriminated against on the basis of such use, possession or transportation, including, but not limited to, denial of otherwise applicable benefits under public assistance programs.

(2) This section does not prohibit such reasonable regulation and registration of those persons who cultivate, harvest, or distribute peyote as may be consistent with the purposes of this Act.

(3) This section does not prohibit application of the provisions of section 481.111(a) of Vernon's Texas Health and Safety Code Annotated, in effect on the date of enactment of this section, insofar as those provisions pertain to the cultivation, harvest, and distribution of peyote.

(4) Nothing in this section shall prohibit any Federal department or agency, in carrying out its statutory responsibilities and functions, from promulgating regulations establishing reasonable limitations on the use or ingestion of peyote prior to or during the performance of duties by sworn law enforcement officers or personnel directly involved in public transportation or any other safety-sensitive positions where the performance of such duties may be adversely affected by such use or ingestion. Such regulations shall be adopted only after consultation with representatives of traditional Indian religions for which the sacramental use of peyote is integral to their practice. Any regulation promulgated pursuant to this section shall be subject to the balancing test set forth in section 3 of the Religious Freedom Restoration Act (Public Law 103-141; 42 U.S.C. 2000bb-1).

(5) This section shall not be construed as requiring prison authorities to permit, nor shall it be construed to prohibit prison authorities from permitting, access to peyote by Indians while incarcerated within Federal or State prison facilities.

(6) Subject to the provisions of the Religious Freedom Restoration Act (Public Law 103-141; 42 U.S.C. 2000bb-1), this section shall not be construed to prohibit States from enacting or enforcing reasonable traffic safety laws or regulations.

(7) Subject to the provisions of the Religious Freedom Restoration Act (Public Law 103-141; 42 USC 2000bb-1), this section does not prohibit the Secretary of Defense from promulgating regulations establishing reasonable limitations on the use, possession, transportation, or distribution of peyote to promote military readiness, safety, or compliance with international law or laws of other countries. Such regulations shall be adopted only after consultation with representatives of traditional Indian religions for which the sacramental use of peyote is integral to their practice.

(c) For purposes of this section –

(1) the term 'Indian' means a member of an Indian tribe;

(2) the term 'Indian tribe' means any tribe, band, nation, pueblo, or other organized group or community of Indians, including any Alaska Native village (as defined in, or established pursuant to, the Alaska Native Claims Settlement Act (43 U.S.S. 1601 et seq.)), which is recognized as eligible for the special programs and services provided by the United States to Indians because of their status as Indians;

(3) the term 'Indian religion' means any religion –

(A) which is practiced by Indians, and

(B) the origin and interpretation of which is from within a traditional Indian culture or community; and

(4) the term 'State' means any State of the United States, and any political subdivision thereof.

(d) Nothing in this section shall be construed as abrogating, diminishing, or otherwise affecting –

(A) the inherent rights of any Indian tribe;

(B) the rights, express or implicit, of any Indian tribe which exist under treaties, executive orders, and laws of the United States;

(C) the inherent right of the Indians to practice their religions under any Federal or State law..

== See also ==
- Outline of United States federal Indian law and policy
- Recognition of Native American sacred sites in the United States
- Peyote Way Church of God, Inc. v. Thornburgh
