= David Finlay (VC) =

Recipient of the Victoria Cross

- Born: 29 January 1893; Guardbridge, Fife
- Died: 21 January 1916 (aged 22); Iraq
- Burial place: Remembered on the Basra Memorial
- Military career
- Allegiance: United Kingdom
- Branch: British Army
- Service years: 1910 - 1916 †
- Rank: Sergeant
- Units: Black Watch
- Conflicts: World War I
- Awards: Victoria Cross

David Finlay VC (29 January 1893 – 21 January 1916) was a Scottish recipient of the Victoria Cross, the highest and most prestigious award for gallantry in the face of the enemy that can be awarded to British and Commonwealth forces.

== Details ==
Finlay was the son of a shepherd named George Finlay and his wife Susan Small. He was 22 years old, and a lance-corporal in the 2nd Battalion, The Black Watch (Royal Highlanders), British Army during the First World War when the following deed took place for which he was awarded the VC.

On 9 May 1915 near Rue du Bois, France, Lance-Corporal Finlay led a bombing party of 12 men in the attack until 10 of them had fallen. He then ordered the two survivors to crawl back and he himself went to the assistance of a wounded man and carried him over a distance of 100 yards of fire-swept ground into cover, quite regardless of his own safety.

Finlay was later promoted to the rank of sergeant. He was killed in action in Mesopotamia on 21 January 1916 and is remembered on the Basra Memorial.

== Further information ==
Finlay is commemorated on the war memorial in Moonzie Kirkyard in Fife. There is now a memorial stone in the children's play park in the north end of Guardbridge his home village. The village also has a recently added street named after him.

== The medal ==
His Victoria Cross is displayed at the Black Watch Museum, Balhousie Castle, Perth, Scotland.
