= Sidney William Ware =

Recipient of the Victoria Cross

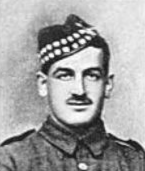
- Born: 11 November 1892; Winterborne Whitechurch, Dorset, England
- Died: 16 April 1916 (aged 23); Mesopotamia
- Burial place: Amara War Cemetery, Iraq
- Military career
- Allegiance: United Kingdom
- Branch: British Army
- Service years: 1911–1916
- Rank: Corporal
- Service number: 920
- Units: Seaforth Highlanders
- Conflicts: World War I
- Awards: Victoria Cross

Corporal Sidney William Ware VC (11 November 1892 – 16 April 1916) was a British recipient of the Victoria Cross, the highest and most prestigious award for gallantry in the face of the enemy that can be awarded to British and Commonwealth forces.

== Details ==
Corporal Sidney William Ware, VC, was born in November 1892 at Whatcombe in the Parish of Winterborne Whitechurch, Dorset. He was educated at the Church of England Boys' School, Whitchurch.

He enlisted into the British Army on 29 November 1911. He served with the 1st Battalion, the Seaforth Highlanders (Ross-shire Buffs, Duke of Albany's) and was with his battalion at Agra in India at the start of the First World War in August 1914. His battalion, which was part of the Dehra Dun Brigade of the 7th (Meerut) Division, immediately went to Europe with the Indian Expeditionary Force A and landed in France in October, where it was in action almost immediately. Corporal Ware was wounded in November and after ten days leave on discharge from hospital, he returned to France. His battalion remained with the same brigade, now re-titled the 19th (Dehra Dun) Brigade, still part of the 7th (Meerut) Division, with it he was sent to Mesopotamia. Here he was again wounded in January 1916, before returning to duty a few months later.

It was then that he won his Victoria Cross on 6 April 1916. During an engagement when the order was given to withdraw to the safety of a communications trench, Corporal Ware, whose cool gallantry had been very marked during the advance, was one of the few men remaining unwounded. He then picked up a wounded man and carried him some 200 yards to cover and then returned for many others, moving to and fro under very heavy fire for more than two hours, until he had brought in all of the wounded and was completely exhausted.

However, although he was not injured on this occasion, he was not to be presented with his Victoria Cross as, a few days later, on 10 April, he was seriously wounded and brought back to the Persian Gulf. He died at the Rawalpindi Hospital on 16 April and was buried in the Amara War Cemetery in Iraq.

He was very fond of football and reading. He was one of eight brothers of a family of 13, four of whom served in the First World War (Harold being the 4th) and one in the second (Douglas). Two were also killed in action, Sergeant Albert C. Ware, of the 1st Battalion, Dorset Regiment, killed on 1 July 1916, and Private Archibald Ware, Wiltshire Regiment, who lost his life on 11 March 1915.

== The medal ==
His Victoria Cross is displayed at The Highlanders Museum (The Queen's Own Highlanders Collection), Fort George, Inverness-shire, Scotland.

== Bibliography ==
- Gliddon, Gerald (2005). The Sideshows. VCs of the First World War. Gloucestershire, England: Sutton Publishing. ISBN 978-0-7509-2084-1.
