= Charles Cowley =

Recipient of the Victoria Cross

- Born: 21 February 1872
- Died: 25 April 1916 (aged 44); Mesopotamia
- Burial place: British cemetery, Bab al Sharji, Baghdad
- Military career
- Allegiance: United Kingdom
- Branch: Royal Naval Volunteer Reserve
- Rank: Lieutenant Commander
- Conflicts: First World War
- Awards: Victoria Cross

Charles Henry Cowley, VC (21 February 1872 – 25 April 1916) was a British merchant seaman and a recipient of the Victoria Cross, the highest award for gallantry in the face of the enemy that can be awarded to British and Commonwealth forces.

== Victoria Cross ==
Cowley was 44 years old, and a lieutenant commander in the Royal Naval Volunteer Reserve during the First World War, when the following deed took place for which he was awarded the Victoria Cross.

On the night of 24/25 April 1916 in Mesopotamia, an attempt was made to reprovision the force besieged at Kut-el-Amara. Lieutenant Commander Cowley, with a lieutenant (Humphrey Osbaldston Brooke Firman) (commanding SS Julnar), a sub-lieutenant and 12 ratings, started off with 210 tons of stores up the River Tigris. Unfortunately Julnar was attacked almost at once by Turkish machine-guns and artillery. At Magasis, steel hawsers stretched across the river halted the expedition, the enemy opened fire at point-blank range and Julnar's bridge was smashed. Julnar's commander was killed, also several of his crew; Lieutenant-Commander Cowley was taken prisoner with the other survivors and almost certainly executed by the Turks.
