= Old Indian Cemetery =

Historic cemetery in Massachusetts, United States

- U.S. National Register of Historic Places
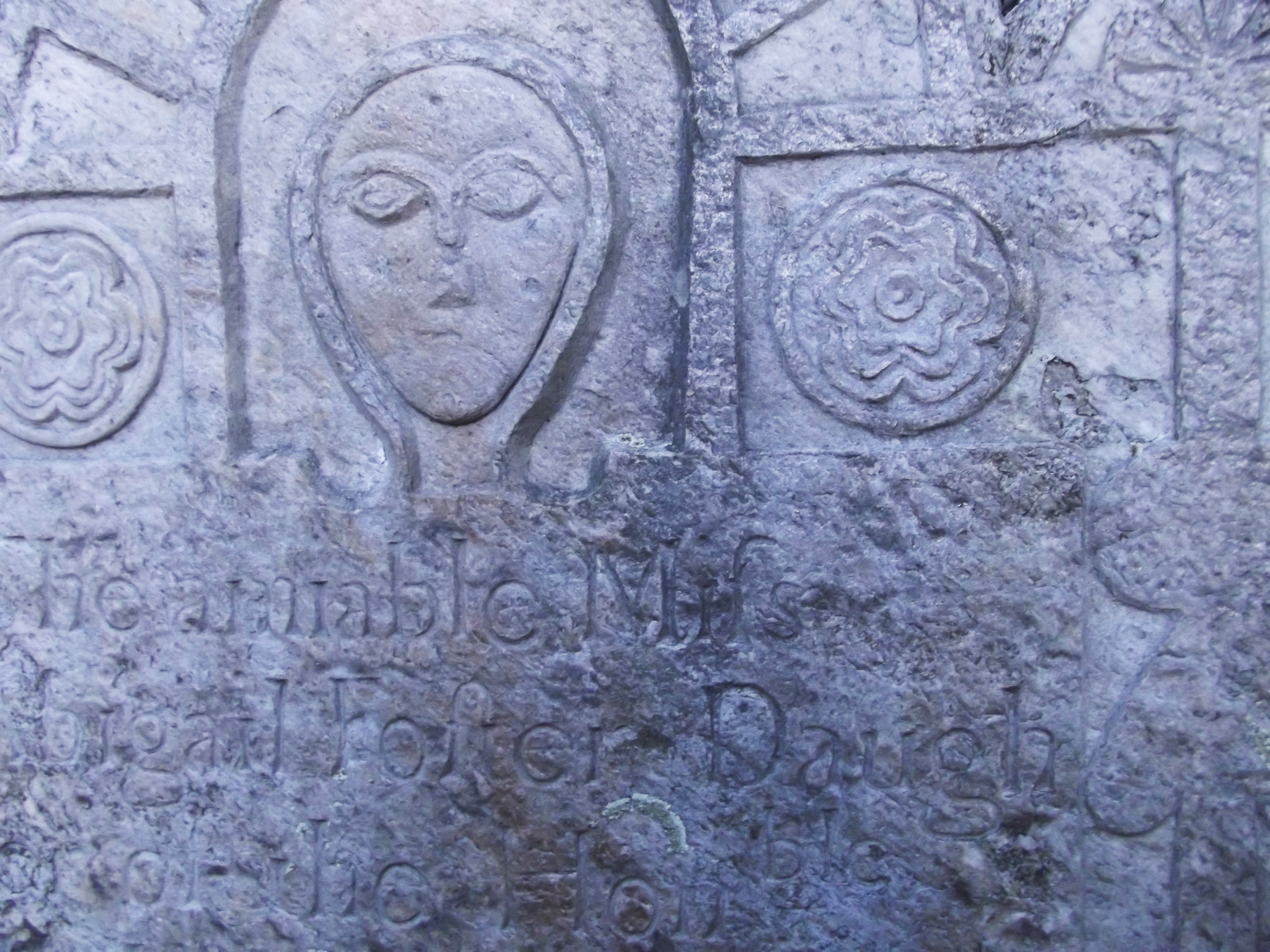

- Location within Massachusetts Location within the United States
- Location: West Brookfield, Massachusetts
- Coordinates: 42°14′13″N 72°8′44″W
- Built: 1710
- NRHP reference No.: 06000400
- Added to NRHP: May 17, 2006

The Old Indian Cemetery or "Old Cemetery" is a historic cemetery at 50 Cottage Street in West Brookfield, Massachusetts.

The cemetery was established in 1710 and was an active burial ground until 1849. The cemetery "is the resting place of 16 French and Indian War soldiers, 11 Revolutionary War soldiers, and 6 men who were killed in 1710 by Indians and became known as the Haymakers. It is also the resting place for Jedediah Foster, his wife and daughter, and Diederick Leertouwer." The site was added to the National Register of Historic Places in 2006.

== See also ==
- National Register of Historic Places listings in Worcester County, Massachusetts
