= Amara (Left Bank) Indian War Cemetery =

WWI CWGC war cemetery in Iraq

Coordinates: 31.8439°N 47.1604°E

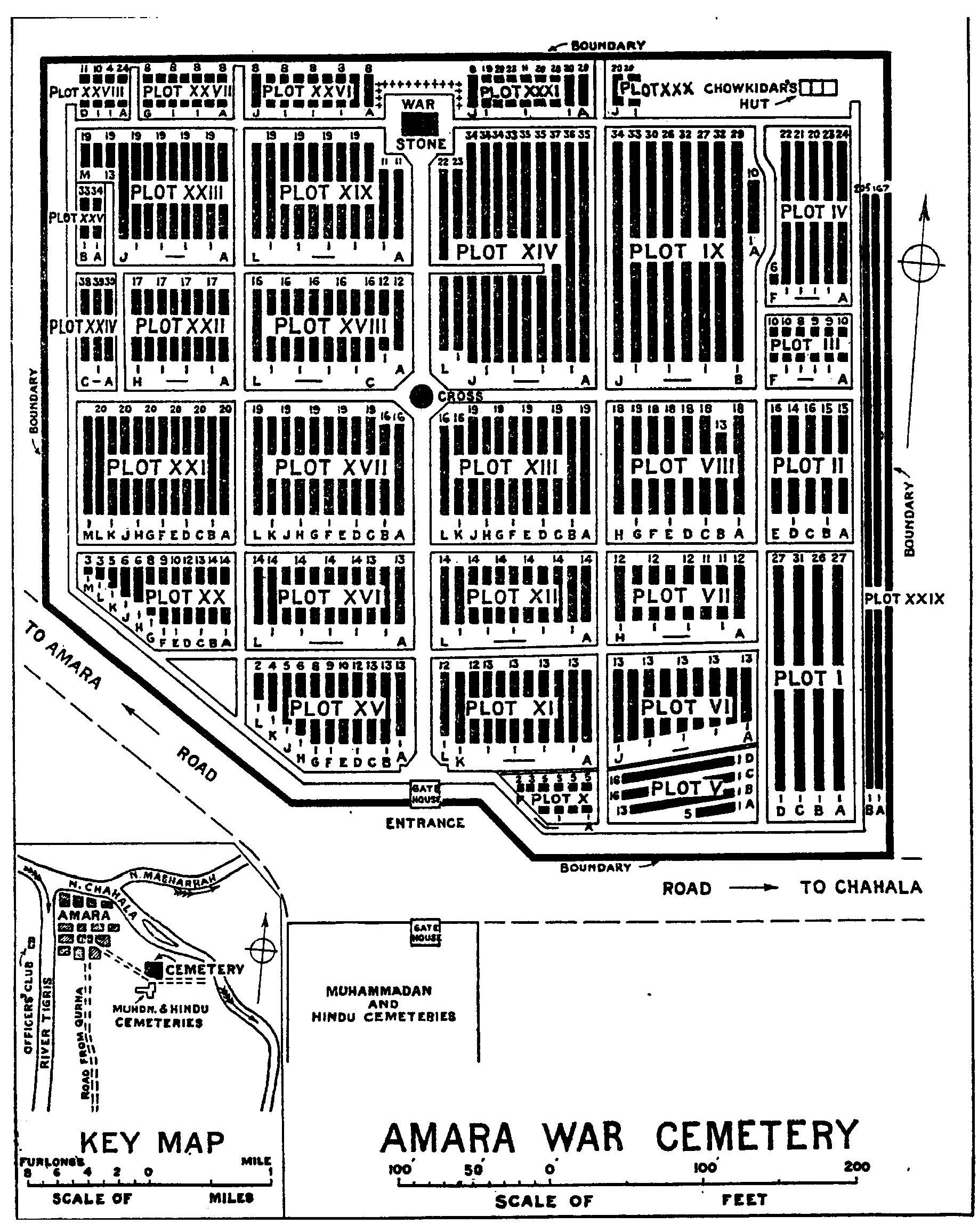
Plan of the British cemetery with the Indian cemetery shown below.

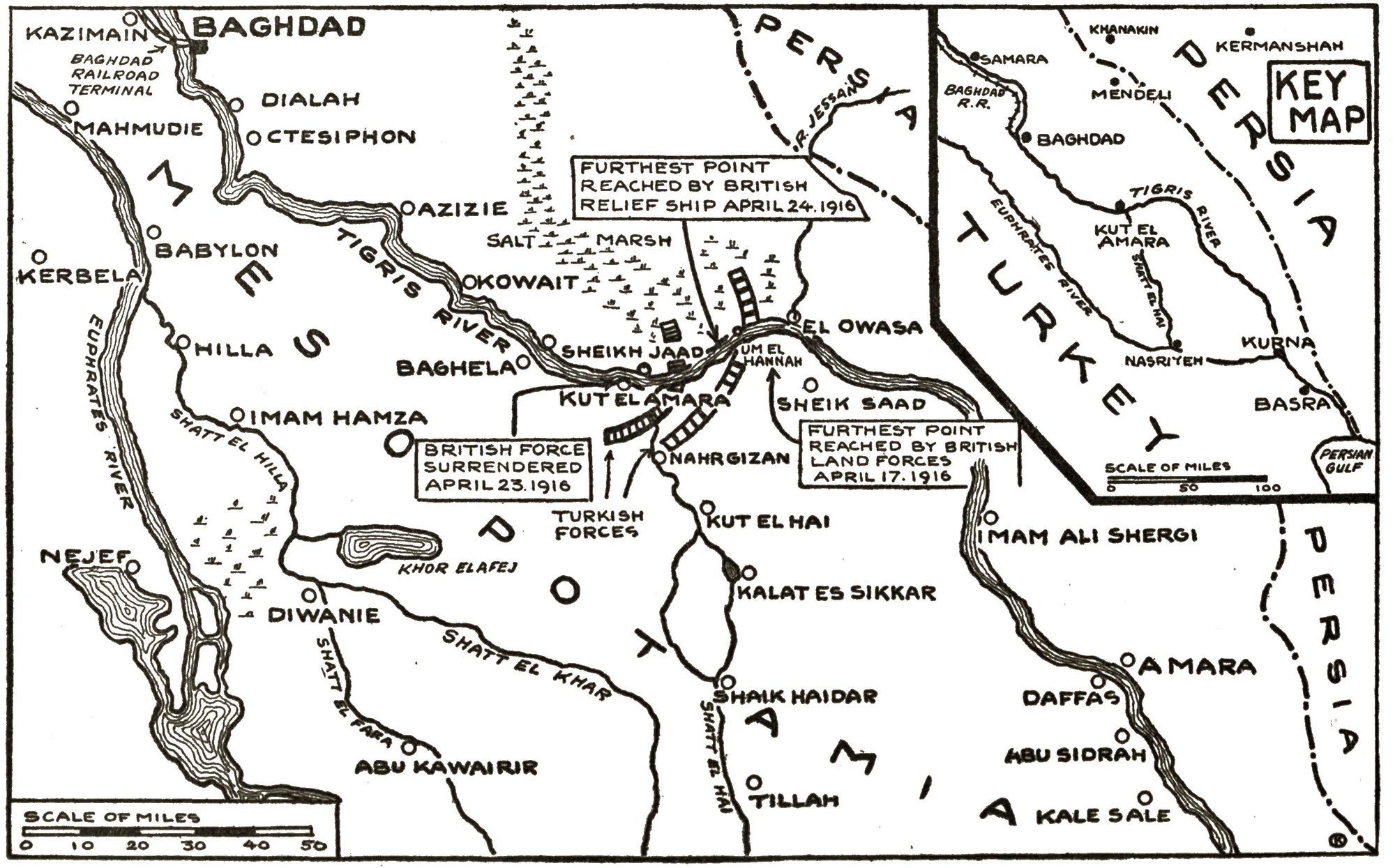
Amara (bottom right) on a map dating from the First World War.

The Amara (Left Bank) Indian War Cemetery is a military cemetery in Amara, now known as Amarah, southern Iraq, which contains the graves of more than 5,000 Indian soldiers who died during the First World War. It is the responsibility of the Commonwealth War Graves Commission (CWGC).

== Location ==
The cemetery is located immediately to the south of one of the branches of the River Tigris where it splits at Amarah in an area that was seized by the Mesopotamian Expeditionary Force during the First World War. Amarah became a major hospital centre with medical detachments on both sides of the river and seven general hospitals. The Indian cemetery is immediately to the south of the British Amara War Cemetery and marked on the map of the British cemetery with the words "Muhammadan and Hindu Cemeteries".

== Interments ==
There are thought to be over 5,000 Indian soldiers interred at Amara, however, only 9 are identified, all of whom were interred after the armistice. According to the CWGC, who are responsible for the cemetery, the records of interments were sent to the Army Adjutant General at Simla Headquarters in 1919 but have since been destroyed.

A memorial was erected that read "In memory of the brave Muhammadans who sacrificed their lives in the Great War for their King and their country".

== Condition ==
In April 2016, Martin Fletcher of The Times in Amarah, reported that the cemetery had been taken over by the Maysan Funfair who had installed merry-go-rounds and a ferris wheel.

== See also ==
- Indian Army during World War I
