= Lyng v. Northwest Indian Cemetery Protective Ass'n =

Lyng v. Northwest Indian Cemetery Protective Association
- Supreme Court of the United States

Argued November 30, 1987 Decided April 19, 1988
- Full case name: Richard E. Lyng, Secretary of Agriculture, et al., Petitioners v. Northwest Indian Cemetery Protective Association, et al.
- Citations: 485 U.S. 439 (more) 108 S. Ct. 1319; 99 L. Ed. 2d 534; 1988 U.S. LEXIS 1871; 56 U.S.L.W. 4292; 18 ELR 21043

Holding
- The American Indian Religious Freedom Act of 1978 (AIRFA) does not create a cause of action under which to sue, nor does it contain any judicially enforceable rights.

Court membership
- Chief Justice William Rehnquist Associate Justices William J. Brennan Jr. · Byron White; Thurgood Marshall · Harry Blackmun; John P. Stevens · Sandra Day O'Connor; Antonin Scalia · Anthony Kennedy

Case opinions
- Majority: O'Connor, joined by Rehnquist, White, Stevens, Scalia
- Dissent: Brennan, joined by Marshall, Blackmun
- Kennedy took no part in the consideration or decision of the case.

Lyng v. Northwest Indian Cemetery Protective Association, 485 U.S. 439 (1988), was a United States Supreme Court landmark case in which the Court ruled on the applicability of the Free Exercise Clause to the practice of religion on Native American sacred lands, specifically in the Chimney Rock area of the Six Rivers National Forest in California. This area, also known as the High Country, was used by the Yurok, Karuk, and Tolowa tribes as a religious site.

The ruling is considered a key example of judicial restraint by the Supreme Court.

== Background ==
In 1982, the United States Forest Service drew up a report known as the Environmental Impact Statement (EIS) that examined the environmental impact of constructing a proposed road through and possibly harvesting timber in the Six Rivers National Forest. Due to the religious importance of the area, the study found that if the U.S. Forest Service's plans went forward, the damage done to the land would be severe and irreparable. Therefore, the report advised against both the road and timber harvesting. Additionally, the EIS suggested possible alternative routes that avoided key religious sites. However, this recommendation and the rest of the report was rejected by the U.S. Forest Service. The report commissioned by the United States Forest Service recognized that the construction of the road would destroy the religion of the American Indian tribes.

American Indian groups (led by the Northwest Indian Cemetery Protective Association) and the State of California sued for an injunction, challenging both the road building and timber harvesting decisions. The court issued a permanent injunction that prohibited the Government from constructing the Chimney Rock section of the road or putting the timber harvesting plan into effect, holding, among other things, that such actions would violate respondent Indians' rights under the Free Exercise Clause of the First Amendment and would violate certain federal statutes.

The Trial Court found for Northwest Indian Cemetery Protective Association and issued an injunction. The USFS appealed. The Appellate Court affirmed and the USFS appealed again bringing the case to the U.S. Supreme Court.

As a case before the U.S. Supreme Court, Lyng v. Northwest Indian Cemetery Protective was argued on November 30, 1987. The petitioner, Richard E. Lyng, the U.S. Secretary of Agriculture at the time, claimed that constructing a road and harvesting timber through lands considered sacred by Native American tribes did not violate the Free Exercise Clause of the First Amendment of the United States Constitution. The respondent in the case was the Northwest Indian Cemetery Protective Association, et al.

With the claim at hand, the U.S. Supreme Court decided to rule on the question of whether the First Amendment's Free Exercise Clause prohibited the government from harvesting or developing the Chimney Rock Area.

== Opinion of the Court ==
After much deliberation, the holding of the court was released on April 19, 1988. In a vote of 5-3 (Anthony M. Kennedy did not participate), the court ruled that "construction of the proposed road does not violate the First Amendment regardless of its effect on the religious practices of the respondents because it compels no behavior contrary to their belief". In doing so, the Court reversed and allowed the road to be built.

In support of the decision, Justice Sandra Day O’Connor cited Bowen v. Roy (1986), a previous U.S. Supreme Court case that involved a family who did not wish to give their child a social security number for religious reasons. Also argued with regard to the Free Exercise Clause, this holding of the court in this case was that the government could not change its system and make an exception for an individual because of religiously based reasons. Judging by the parallels in this case with that of Lyng, Justice O’ Connor found that although damage would certainly be done to the Six Rivers/Chimney Rock area, the road construction and timber harvesting would not force individuals to violate their beliefs or be denied of the equal rights shared by other citizens of the United States. In deciding the case, the Supreme Court had to determine whether a government action would cause a "substantial burden" on religion. Since the United States Forest Service's report had recognized that the religion of tribes would effectively be irreparably harmed, the tribes had a strong argument that they met this element of the law. However, the Supreme Court set out new requirements for proving substantial burden. The Court stated that a substantial burden only exist where the government imposes a sanction (fine or imprisonment) or denies a benefit to individuals that they would otherwise be entitled to receive. Since this case involved neither, the decision found that no substantial burden existed.

Justice William J. Brennan Jr. disagreed with the majority opinion and, with a citation of the case Sherbert v. Verner (1963), declared that the holding of Lyng stripped Native Americans of their Constitutional protection against threats to their religious practices.

== Subsequent developments ==
After the case was decided, Congress intervened and designated the area a "wilderness" under the Wilderness Act, and the road was not built. The Act protected the High Country, by adding it to the Siskiyou Wilderness Area.

Suzan Shown Harjo, a Cheyenne-Muskogee writer and activist who influenced the drafting of the American Indian Religious Freedom Act (AIRFA) of 1978, called Lyng v. Northwest Indian Cemetery Protective Association a "stunning defeat" for the Native American cause. In a twenty-five-year retrospective of AIRFA, published in 2004, she described how the Lyng decision galvanized Native American activists to press for other claims, for example in fishing rights, and how it helped to inspire efforts towards the "repatriation" of Native American cultural materials while contributing to the establishment of the Smithsonian's National Museum of the American Indian.

== See also ==
- List of U.S. Supreme Court Cases involving Indian tribes
- American Indian Religious Freedom Act

=== Related cases ===
- Wisconsin v. Yoder, 406 U.S. 205 (1972)
- Thomas v. Review Board of the Indiana Employment Security Division, 450 U.S. 707 (1981)
