= Little Sisters of the Poor Saints Peter and Paul Home v. Pennsylvania =

- Supreme Court of the United States

Argued May 6, 2020 Decided July 8, 2020
- Full case name: Little Sisters of the Poor Saints Peter and Paul Home v. Pennsylvania, et al. Donald J. Trump, President of the United States, et al. v. Pennsylvania, et al.
- Docket nos.: 19-431; 19-454
- Citations: 591 U.S. 657 (more) 140 S. Ct. 2367

Case history
- Prior: Preliminary injunctions granted, Pennsylvania v. Trump, 281 F. Supp. 3d 553 (E.D. Pa. 2017), 351 F. Supp. 3d 791 (E.D. Pa. 2019); Affirmed sub nom. Pennsylvania v. President United States, 930 F.3d 543 (3d Cir. 2019); Cert. granted, Little Sisters of the Poor Saints Peter & Paul Home v. Pa., 140 S. Ct. 918 (2020)

Holding
- The Departments had the authority under the ACA to promulgate the religious and moral exemptions. The rules promulgating the exemptions are free from procedural defects.

Court membership
- Chief Justice John Roberts Associate Justices Clarence Thomas · Ruth Bader Ginsburg; Stephen Breyer · Samuel Alito; Sonia Sotomayor · Elena Kagan; Neil Gorsuch · Brett Kavanaugh

Case opinions
- Majority: Thomas, joined by Roberts, Alito, Gorsuch, Kavanaugh
- Concurrence: Alito, joined by Gorsuch
- Concurrence: Kagan (in judgment), joined by Breyer
- Dissent: Ginsburg, joined by Sotomayor

Laws applied
- Affordable Care Act, Religious Freedom Restoration Act

Little Sisters of the Poor Saints Peter and Paul Home v. Pennsylvania, 591 U.S. 657 (2020), was a United States Supreme Court case involving ongoing conflicts between the Affordable Care Act (ACA) and the Religious Freedom Restoration Act (RFRA) over the ACA's contraceptive mandate. The ACA exempts nonprofit religious organizations from complying with the mandate, to which for-profit religious organizations objected.

The case is a result of prior court actions in Burwell v. Hobby Lobby Stores, Inc., in 2014, and Zubik v. Burwell, in 2016, which left the United States Department of Health and Human Services (HHS) to promulgate new regulations on the mandate. President Donald Trump issued an Executive Order to the HHS to bypass the traditional regulatory process, leading HHS to devise new rules in late 2017 to give for-profit groups exemptions for religious or moral objections to the mandate. Several states sued the federal government, and multiple Circuit Courts placed injunctions on the new rules as arbitrary and capricious and required by neither the ACA or the RFRA, violating the Administrative Procedure Act (APA). This case was a consolidation of two appeals from the injunction placed by the United States Court of Appeals for the Third Circuit. The Supreme Court ruled on July 8, 2020, in a 7–2 decision that the new rules were valid, as the associated departments had the authority to promulgate the exemptions, and that the process to put the rules in place did not violate the APA.

== Background ==
=== Burwell v. Hobby Lobby Stores, Inc. ===
The Patient Protection and Affordable Care Act (ACA) passed in 2010 under President Barack Obama. The ACA did not displace the system then in effect whereby most of the U.S. population receives health insurance under plans that their employers arrange through the private market. Instead it sought to expand the number who are insured and improve and subsidize insurance coverage. Regulations within the ACA and its Women's Health Amendment imposed a range of requirements on group health plans, which included that they cover "essential health benefits", including "preventative and wellness services" from health care providers without imposing cost sharing on patients. The Obama administration, through the United States Department of Health and Human Services (HHS) as directed through the Health Resources and Services Administration (HRSA), decided that to meet "compelling health and gender equity goals", the ACA's "preventative and wellness services" included contraceptives. This contraceptive mandate required employers with more than 50 employees to offer health plans that included some coverage of contraceptives. Churches were exempted from the mandate, but other nonprofit religious groups were initially required to comply. Numerous religious groups, both for- and nonprofit and particularly those of the Catholic faith, were critical of the mandate, arguing that the use of contraceptives is morally wrong and a sin. To accommodate these complaints, the Obama administration refined an exception for nonprofit religious groups to allow them to submit Employee Benefits Security Administration (EBSA) Form 700 to the HHS to request an exception, starting on January 1, 2014. With an approved exception, the HHS was then to work with the groups' insurance carriers to cover the cost of contraceptives.

Even with the changes, there was still opposition to the mandate from for-profit religious groups, leading to the Supreme Court case Burwell v. Hobby Lobby Stores, Inc. to review the ruling from the United States Court of Appeals for the Tenth Circuit. The Christian-based retail franchise Hobby Lobby argued that the mandate violated its free exercise of religion rights established by the First Amendment of the United States Constitution and affirmed in the Religious Freedom Restoration Act (RFRA). The Supreme Court affirmed this in its 5–4 ruling, holding that the administration's mandate created a substantial burden on for-profit religious organizations, and that because the administration was able to set a special exemption for nonprofit religious groups, there was a similar way to reduce that burden on for-profits. The Supreme Court's decision created a temporary exemption that followed the same process via Form 700 used by nonprofit religious groups.

=== Zubik v. Burwell ===
The decision in Hobby Lobby remained controversial since it left the contraceptive mandate in place. Nonprofit religious organizations claimed that even with the exception, they would be complicit in offering contraceptives to employees. Several lawsuits were filed in the Circuit Courts. A circuit split was created, and the Supreme Court consolidated seven cases into Zubik v. Burwell in challenge to the United States Court of Appeals for the Third Circuit's ruling, which upheld the nonprofit exception route.

Before Zubik was heard in oral arguments, Justice Antonin Scalia died, and as he had joined the majority in Hobby Lobby, the possibility of a tie vote arose. The court did not come to a final opinion on Zubik but instead vacated all decisions on the cases and remanded them to their respective courts for further review. In a per curiam order in May 2016, the Supreme Court requested the parties and courts to work with the HHS to come up with regulations that respected the parties' concerns. The Supreme Court emphasized in its instructions that the petitioning parties, the religious organizations, had stated in their court documents that "their religious exercise is not infringed where they 'need to do nothing more than contract for a plan that does not include coverage for some or all forms of contraception'" and urged the parties to find a solution amenable to that position.

=== Post-Zubik events ===
Parties expected to move forward through a standard approach to introducing new executive regulations, in which HHS published a request for information in July 2016, after which it would have drafted new regulations, posted them within the Federal Register for public comment before making a final rulemaking decision. But with Donald Trump becoming president at the start of 2017, many of the executive branch agencies' agendas quickly altered. In May 2017, Trump enacted Executive Order 13798, "Promoting Free Speech and Religious Liberty", which directed HHS to consider alternate routes to address conscience-based objection and led HHS to issue new interim rules that allowed employers with religious or moral objections to be exempted from ACA's contraceptive mandate.

Multiple states challenged the new rules. Among the first was Pennsylvania; later, New Jersey challenged the Government in the United States District Court for the Eastern District of Pennsylvania, asserting that the process violated the Administrative Procedure Act (APA), Title VII of the Civil Rights Act of 1964, and the Equal Protection Clause of the Fourteenth Amendment and the Establishment Clause of the First Amendment of the Constitution. The Little Sisters of the Poor Saints Peter and Paul Home, one of the religious organizations that had been part of the earlier litigation, sought to intervene since it would be affected by a ruling favoring the state, which the District Court denied but was reversed by the United States Court of Appeals for the Third Circuit. The District Court subsequently granted a temporary injunction on the new HHS rulings, which the Third Circuit upheld, finding that the rules violated the APA and were unnecessary under both the ACA and the RFRA, making them arbitrary and capricious. It ordered a nationwide injunction on their use.

By the time the Supreme Court agreed to hear the Pennsylvania case, the rules had also been enjoined by the Ninth Circuit.

==== "Moral Cooperation with Evil" and Form 700 ====
Despite the federal government's and the Supreme Court's efforts to resolve the issue, several Catholic groups, including the Little Sisters, denied that any accommodation had been made at all.

Writing for Religion News Service, Thomas Reese reported that the Obama administration had hoped to resolve the issue through a workaround whereby religious nonprofits that objected to the mandate would send in a signed form saying that they objected to covering contraception in their insurance plans. Rejecting this, the Little Sisters held that "even signing the government-mandated form would be 'cooperating with evil.'" They called it a "permission slip" that could allow someone else to provide contraceptives. Reese was even consulted by the Obama administration and suggested that no form be required, but was told "that the complexity of the industry made my suggestion unworkable."

Citing the same moral theory, the Sisters' co-litigants Priests for Life held that filing out the government paperwork (Form 700) would not only register their objections and exempt them from participation in the plan but would also trigger a series of events that in the end would result in the delivery of contraception to persons in their employ who sought it. Their brief to the Court stated that this would cause "mortal sin and scandal" and that "This is true whether the immoral services are paid for directly, indirectly, or even not at all by Priests for Life. …the burden imposed upon Petitioners' religious exercise by the challenged mandate is precisely the same whether the government is forcing Petitioners to authorize and facilitate 'access to and utilization of' contraceptive services for Priests for Life's plan participants and beneficiaries via submitting a 'certification' or notice or via payment to Priests for Life's insurance carrier."

Covering the controversy for Roll Call, Melinda Henneberger wrote, "Religious nonprofits can be exempted if they sign a form notifying the government, which then sets up the coverage through the group's existing plan at no additional cost to the organization." She put the matter to the Witherspoon Institute’s Matthew J. Frank, who responded that for the Catholic groups in the case, "signing the form is the violation of the faith. At a minimum it is material cooperation with evil, because the signature on the form or letter is the 'but for' cause of the evil being done—that is, but for the Little Sisters signing the form the government demands, the transaction of their insurers providing the contraception the government demands would not occur."

In an Amicus brief to the court, 50 Catholic theologians and ethicists wrote in support of the Sisters' position. They wrote that abortion, sterilization, and contraception "are grave wrongs under the Catholic faith." The authors explained that in Catholic tradition a "material cooperation" with wrongdoing is when "the believer could reasonably foresee that his or her action will facilitate or assist the performance of the objectionable action by the third party, but does not share in the principal agent's intention to commit the action." The brief also put forward the position that if the Sisters complied with the mandate, it could qualify "as formal cooperation in wrongdoing…when the believer, in cooperating, shares in the intention that the forbidden action be committed by the other party." According to the brief, "Many theologians in the Catholic tradition have concluded that an agent who obeys a command to perform an action in furtherance of an immoral objective comes to share in the immoral intention of the commander, even if the objective is contrary to the agent’s personal preferences, and even if the action is performed under duress. On this view, such an agent engages in formal cooperation with wrongdoing, which is never permissible." Reflecting on Catholic tradition, the authors also wrote, "compliance with the Mandate in any form would cause 'scandal,' or encouraging others to engage in wrongdoing. ..create the appearance of complicity...[and] undermine their public witness against the use of abortifacients and contraceptives." They conclude that in line with Catholic tradition the Sisters "very reasonably conclude that compliance with the Mandate—whether by executing Form 700, by submitting the HHS Notice, or by maintaining a health plan or insurance relationship through which the objectionable coverage is provided—would involve either formal cooperation in wrongdoing, or impermissible material cooperation in serious wrongdoing, and would therefore be gravely wrongful." As use of Form 700 "is designed to facilitate providing contraceptive coverage" by giving the government information it can use "to assign to [a] third party the obligation for providing contraceptive coverage", they cannot comply, as this is "objectively immoral" and any actions that aid in bringing about that end share in its immorality.

Some Catholics, such as co-litigant Bishop David Zubik, objected to the mandate because it forced Catholic groups "to maintain an objectionable contractual relationship" with an insurer or TPA who provides or procures contraception, and demanded that any Catholic group not be "forced to maintain a contractual relationship with any company obligated, authorized, or incentivized to provide abortifacient and contraceptive coverage" because this "compels it to act in contravention to its beliefs."

==== RFRA ====
The Catholic groups opposing the mandate held that it violated the Religious Freedom Restoration Act (RFRA), which "Prohibits any agency, department, or official of the United States or any State (the government) from substantially burdening a person's exercise of religion even if the burden results from a rule of general applicability, except that the government may burden a person's exercise of religion only if it demonstrates that application of the burden to the person: (1) furthers a compelling governmental interest; and (2) is the least restrictive means of furthering that compelling governmental interest."

Those opposing the mandate held that what constituted a "substantial burden" under RFRA should be determined by the religious party involved, not the government. In its Amicus brief in support of the Sisters, First Liberty Institute (FLI) wrote, "government substantially burdens religious beliefs when it exerts substantial pressure on a religious adherent to modify his behavior and, thus, to violate his sincere beliefs". In its own brief supporting the Little Sisters, Liberty Counsel wrote that when the government holds that due to the accommodation process there is no substantial burden, the government is "asserting that they, not the religious adherents, are the arbiters of what is a substantial burden, and concomitantly, what is a valid religious belief. …[this] assertion of authority over the question of what is a substantial burden contradicts founding principles, the First Amendment, RFRA and this Court's precedents." It held that for the Court to agree with HHS would violate "the longstanding right of religious adherents to define the nature and extent of their religious beliefs, including whether a government regulation substantially burdens them."

The Third Circuit court had agreed with the government's position that thanks to the accommodation any sense of responsibility by the religious objectors should be settled: "The religious objectors who oppose the Accommodation mechanism disapprove of 'what follows from' filing the self-certification form[,] …[but] 'the actual provision of contraception coverage is by a third party,' so any possible burden from the notification procedure is not substantial. …No matter how sincerely held their beliefs may be, we cannot accept at face value that subscribing to the plan imposes a 'substantial burden.'" FLI and other supporters of the Sisters held that this violated Burwell v. Hobby Lobby. In that case, the government had argued that even if the company's owners held that the destruction of an embryo was morally wrong, the concern was "too attenuated" because "providing the coverage would not itself result in the destruction of an embryo; that would occur only if an employee chose to take advantage of the coverage and to use one of the four methods [of contraception that may operate after the fertilization of an egg] at issue." The Supreme Court held that the government had dodged "the question that RFRA presents (whether the HHS mandate imposes a substantial burden on the ability of the objecting parties to conduct business in accordance with their religious beliefs)" and had arrogated "the authority to provide a binding national answer to this religious and philosophical question...namely, the circumstances under which it is wrong for a person to perform an act that is innocent in itself but that has the effect of enabling or facilitating the commission of an immoral act by another." In Hobby Lobby, the Court rebuffed the government, declaring, "it is not for us to say that their religious beliefs are mistaken or insubstantial." The Court held that there was a substantial burden, saying, "Because the contraceptive mandate forces them to pay an enormous sum of money—as much as $475 million per year in the case of Hobby Lobby—if they insist on providing insurance coverage in accordance with their religious beliefs, the mandate clearly imposes a substantial burden on those beliefs." Liberty Counsel wrote, "the government cannot arrogate to itself the determination of the relative weight of the burden …What was true for the for-profit faith based organizations in Hobby Lobby is true for the non-profit faith-based organizations here. …As this Court did in Hobby Lobby, it should refuse to take that step and reject Respondents’ attempt to once again second guess the veracity of Petitioners' beliefs. FLI argued that as "the Accommodation also require the religious employers who object to it to violate their beliefs or incur a penalty for noncompliance", the Sisters would refuse to comply with the accommodation and face the same heavy monetary penalties for resisting regulations that violate their religious convictions as the owners of Hobby Lobby faced.

FLI also dismissed the Third Circuit's claim that the effect on non-religious parties for enforcing RFRA had to be weighed in any decision invoking it. The Court had worried that finding for the religious objectors "would impose an undue burden on nonbeneficiaries—the female employees who will lose coverage for contraceptive care." FLI held that such thinking "advanced the dangerous and legally incorrect idea that third party 'harm' supersedes RFRA's protections for religious objectors—virtually nullifying RFRA. …RFRA would have no meaning if it only applied where no other interest competed with the religious objector's interest." Again it cited Burwell V. Hobby Lobby, according to which "[I]t could not reasonably be maintained that any burden on religious exercise…is permissible under RFRA so long as the relevant legal obligation requires the religious adherent to confer a benefit on third parties." FLI wrote, "the notion that third party harm vetoes any interest in religious toleration is a prevalent deception RFRA opponents advance, but RFRA is by nature a burden-shifting standard. …in structuring and passing RFRA, Congress accepted the consequence that religious tolerance may sometimes affect third parties. …the lower court flipped RFRA on its head by mandating that the government find a means of applying RFRA that is least restrictive on third parties, not least restrictive on religious objectors."

Liberty Counsel also denied that there was any "compelling governmental interest" in the mandate that a person trying to apply RFRA would have to note. It cast the mandate's effects as "a newly minted 'right' of free employer-provided contraceptives, which in reality is nothing more than a convenience. …not necessary for public order or the common good".

FLI argued that the government had failed to use "the least restrictive means" as demanded by RFRA as it had already "exempted many entities from providing contraception without any Accommodation process" including houses of worship, religious orders, and self-run insurance plans that were owned and operated by religious groups (referred to as "Church Plans"). Therefore, when it came to religious nonprofits, the government had no justification to force them "to comply with either the Contraceptives Mandate or the Accommodation against their sincere religious beliefs." FLI held that the mandate "manifests an aggressive effort to compel the religious objector to assimilate with popular secular beliefs", and the lower jurisdictions' ruling in its favor "converts the federal courts into instruments of religious oppression, ready to intervene when the executive branch is no longer willing to oppress religious dissenters itself."

==== Political considerations ====
Writing for Religion News Service, Reese questioned whether both sides had goodwill throughout the process: "each side was suspicious of the other and any kind of deal became impossible." He held that the HHS lawyers while expert in health care law, were oblivious to case law around religious freedom. This had caused the original regulations to be open to withering criticism from religious nonprofits and Republicans, who vehemently opposed the ACA as a whole. Reese pointed out that shortly before the controversy began the HHS had denied the U.S. Conference of Catholic Bishops a government grant to assist people being trafficked on account of their refusal to refer clients for birth control or abortion services. Resulting in critics of the administration decrying events as "a planned assault on religion...[and] an organized conspiracy against religious believers." Reese noted that the Little Sisters were "advised by extremely conservative moralist and lawyers. In addition, some bishops and Republican Catholics saw a fight over religious freedom with the Obama administration as politically advantageous." He pointed out that Roman Catholic Cardinal Timothy M. Dolan of New York met with President Obama in hopes of resolving the issue, and afterward had said he was hopeful matters could be resolved but "was forced [to] back off by other bishops." Reese reported that there were also those around Obama who held that the conflict with the bishops would rally their own base as well, including supporters of Planned Parenthood (which opposed all exemptions).

== Supreme Court ==
Both the government and Little Sisters petitioned the Supreme Court on the Third Circuit decision. The Supreme Court agreed in January 2020 to hear the cases, consolidating both the Little Sisters and government petition.

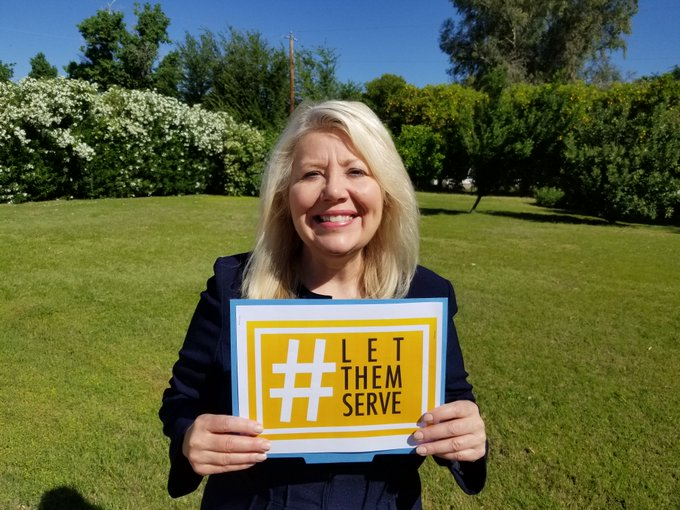
Congressmember Debbie Lesko showing her support for the Little Sisters of the Poor Saints Peter in 2020.

Oral arguments were heard on May 6, 2020, part of the set of cases heard via teleconference due to the COVID-19 pandemic. Court arguments were made trying to balance religious freedom versus women's health. Justice Ruth Bader Ginsburg, who had just undergone an emergency surgical procedure, called in from her hospital room while recovering to remind the court that "In this area of religious freedom the major trend is not to give everything to one side and nothing to the other side. We have had a history of accommodation, of tolerance."

The Supreme Court issued its ruling on July 8, 2020. The decision found that the rules put forth by the HHS and other departments were valid as they had the authority under the ACA to issue them, and that there were no procedural issues under the APA with how they were put into place. The ruling reversed the Third Circuit and remanded the case for review. The 7–2 majority opinion was written by Justice Clarence Thomas which was joined by Chief Justice John Roberts and Justices Samuel Alito, Neil Gorsuch and Brett Kavanaugh. Thomas wrote that "We hold that the [administration] had the authority to provide exemptions from the regulatory contraceptive requirements for employers with religious and conscientious objections."

Justice Elena Kagan wrote a concurrence in judgement, joined by Justice Stephen Breyer. Kagan agreed with the majority in that the HHS and other departments did have authority to issue new rules, but was not sure if the proposed rules met the APA challenge and agreed with remanding the case to the lower courts for further review on this matter.

Justice Ruth Bader Ginsburg wrote the dissent, joined by Justice Sonia Sotomayor. Ginsburg wrote critically "Today, for the first time, the Court casts totally aside countervailing rights and interests in its zeal to secure religious rights to the nth degree." The dissent would be the last authored by Justice Ginsburg prior to her death in September 2020.

== Aftermath ==
A lawsuit challenging whether Trump's rule met the APA was initiated in Pennsylvania. In August 2025, Judge Wendy Beetlestone ruled that the blanket exemption of Trump's rule was too broad given the small number of employers who may need it, writing that the exemption rule "casts doubt on whether ... there is a rational connection between the problem the Agencies identified and the solution they had chosen".
