= EBSA Form 700 =

United States Department of Labor form

EBSA Form 700, version as of January 1, 2014

EBSA Form 700, revised version as of August 2014

EBSA Form 700 is a form that the United States Government had required certain non-profit organizations to complete and submit, beginning January 1, 2014, in order to claim an exemption from the contraceptive mandate under the Affordable Care Act. After the U.S. Supreme court issued temporary injunctions, preventing any penalty against some non-profit institutions who objected to filing the form, the U.S. Department of Labor issued a new version of the form making it clear that organizations can, instead object by a letter.

== Affordable Care Act ==
In 2010, Congress passed the Affordable Care Act (ACA), which relies on the Health Resources and Services Administration (HRSA), part of the Department of Health and Human Services (HHS), to specify what kinds of preventive care for women should be covered in certain employer-based health plans. HHS exempted churches (including houses of worship, such as synagogues and mosques) and their integrated auxiliaries, associations of churches, and any religious order that engages exclusively in religious activity. Other non-profit organizations that object to any required contraception coverage were to file an EBSA Form 700 with their insurance company notifying them of the non-profit's objection. The insurance company would then provide the contraceptive coverage directly to employees without any involvement of the employer, including any distribution of literature or extra payments by the employer.

== Litigation ==
The Little Sisters of the Poor, a Roman Catholic religious order, runs over 25 homes for low-income elderly in the United States and therefore is not automatically exempt from the contraceptive mandate. It objected to filing Form 700 because it believed that doing would make the order complicit in providing contraception, a sin under Roman Catholic doctrine. On December 31, 2013, the day before the filing requirement was to come into effect, Supreme Court Justice Sonia Sotomayor granted a temporary injunction to the Little Sisters of the Poor, allowing them to simply inform the Secretary of Health and Human Services of their objections, pending resolution of the case. Other religious institutions filed similar objections.

On June 30, 2014, the Supreme Court ruled 5 to 4 in Burwell v. Hobby Lobby that under the Religious Freedom Restoration Act (RFRA), closely held for-profit corporations are exempt from the contraceptive mandate, if they object on religious grounds, because the accommodation offered to objecting non-profits would be a less restrictive way to achieve the ACA's interest.

On July 3, 2014, the Supreme Court granted a temporary exemption to the approach it suggested as a less restrictive alternative in Hobby Lobby, where the plaintiffs would send an EBSA Form 700 to its insurance issuer, which would pay for the contraception. In an unsigned emergency injunction for Wheaton College in Illinois, the court said that instead of notifying its insurance issuer, Wheaton can notify the government. Once notified, the government should notify the issuer. Wheaton believed that by transferring the obligation to cover contraceptives to its insurance issuer, it was triggering that obligation. The emergency injunction does not constitute a ruling on the merits of Wheaton's religious objection. The court said "Nothing in this interim order affects the ability of the applicant’s employees and students to obtain, without cost, the full range of FDA approved contraceptives." In a 15-page dissent joined by the other two women on the court, Justice Sotomayor criticized the majority's reasoning and distinguished it from the situation with the Little Sisters of the Poor.

== Revised form ==
A revised version of EBSA Form 700, was issued effective August 2014, that says "[a]s an alternative to using this form, an eligible organization may provide notice to the Secretary of Health and Human Services that the eligible organization has a religious objection to providing coverage for all or a subset of contraceptive services...". The form includes a link to a suggested model notification letter. The model notification letter can be found at .

== See also ==
- Zubik v. Burwell
