= Saint-Pern =

Saint-Pern Saent-Pèrn (Gallo) Sant-Pern (Breton)
- Commune
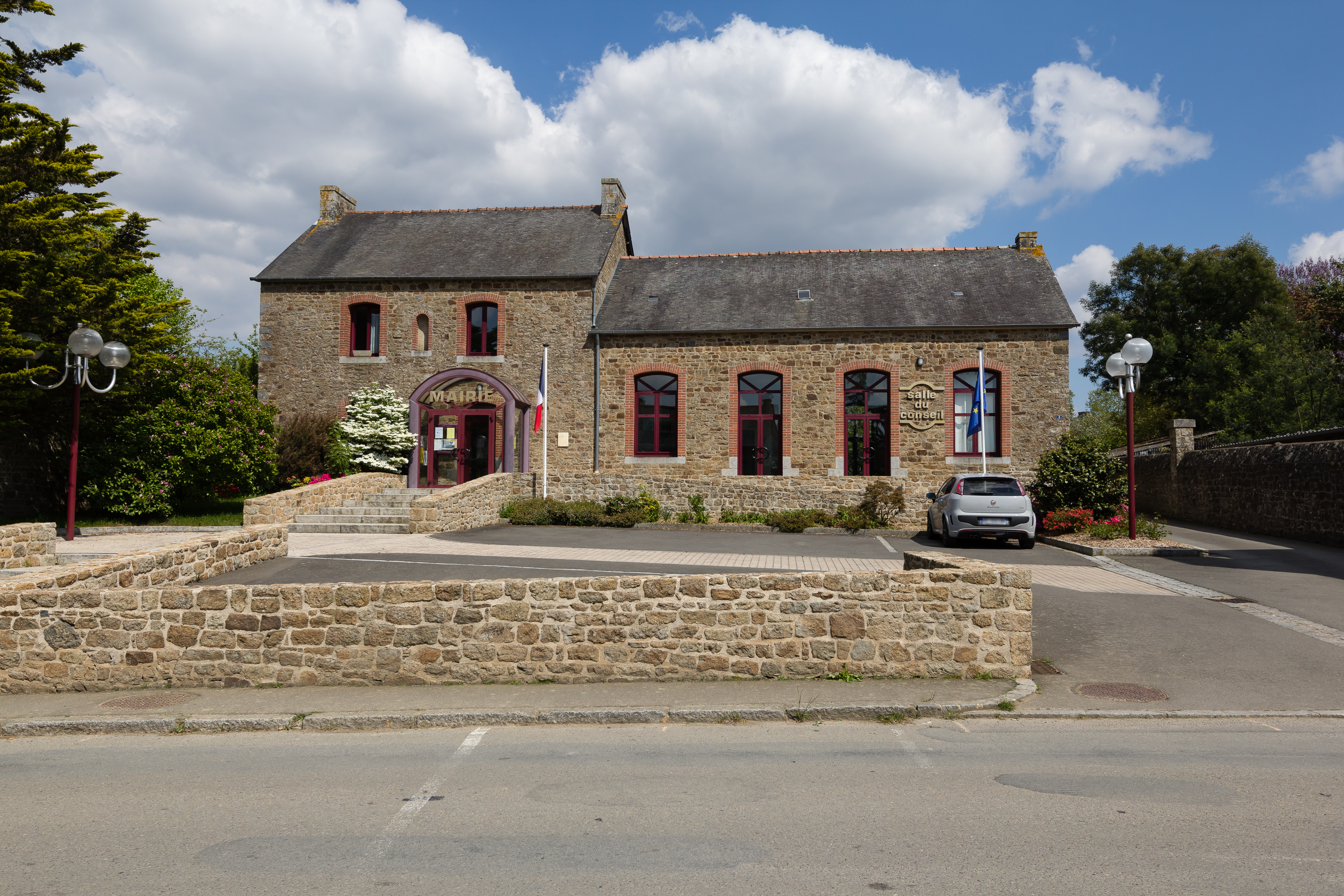
- The town hall of Saint-Pern

- Coat of arms
- Location of Saint-Pern
- Location within France Location within Brittany
- Coordinates: 48°17′19″N 1°59′07″W
- Country: France
- Region: Brittany
- Department: Ille-et-Vilaine
- Arrondissement: Rennes
- Canton: Montauban-de-Bretagne
- Intercommunality: Saint-Méen Montauban

Government
  - Mayor (2020–2026): Marie-Hélène Frenoy
- Area^{1}: 12.13 km^{2} (4.68 sq mi)
- Highest elevation: 181 m (594 ft)
- Lowest elevation: 56 m (184 ft)
- Population (2023): 966
  - Density: 79.6/km^{2} (206/sq mi)
- Time zone: UTC+01:00 (CET)
  - Summer (DST): UTC+02:00 (CEST)
- INSEE/Postal code: 35307 /35190
- ^{1} French Land Register data, which excludes lakes, ponds, glaciers > 1 km^{2} (0.386 sq mi or 247 acres) and river estuaries.

Saint-Pern (French pronunciation: [sɛ̃ pɛʁn]; Breton: Sant-Pern; Gallo: Saent-Pèrn) is a commune in the Ille-et-Vilaine department in Brittany in northwestern France.

Saint-Pern is the burial place of Saint Jeanne Jugan, where the motherhouse of the Little Sisters of the Poor at La Tour St. Joseph is located.

== Population ==
Inhabitants of Saint-Pern are called saint-pernais in French.

Historical population
| Year | Pop. | ±% p.a. |
|---|---|---|
| 1968 | 865 | — |
| 1975 | 852 | −0.22% |
| 1982 | 773 | −1.38% |
| 1990 | 710 | −1.06% |
| 1999 | 781 | +1.06% |
| 2007 | 904 | +1.84% |
| 2012 | 994 | +1.92% |
| 2017 | 1,033 | +0.77% |
| 2023 | 966 | −1.11% |
Source: INSEE

== See also ==
- Communes of the Ille-et-Vilaine department
