= United States v. Lee (1982) =

- Supreme Court of the United States

Argued November 2, 1981 Decided February 23, 1982
- Full case name: United States v. Lee
- Citations: 455 U.S. 252 (more) 102 S. Ct. 1051; 71 L. Ed. 2d 127
- Argument: Oral argument

Case history
- Prior: 497 F. Supp. 180 (W.D. Pa. 1980)

Holding
- The tax imposed on employers to support the Social Security System does not violate the Free Exercise Clause due to its need to be uniformly applicable and its accomplishment of an overriding governmental interest.

Court membership
- Chief Justice Warren E. Burger Associate Justices William J. Brennan Jr. · Byron White; Thurgood Marshall · Harry Blackmun; Lewis F. Powell Jr. · William Rehnquist; John P. Stevens · Sandra Day O'Connor

Case opinions
- Majority: Burger, joined by Brennan, White, Marshall, Blackmun, Powell, Rehnquist, O'Connor
- Concurrence: Stevens

United States v. Lee, 455 U.S. 252 (1982), was a United States Supreme Court case establishing precedent regarding the limits of the Free Exercise Clause regarding free exercise of religious conscience by employers.

== Background ==
The appellant, Amish carpenter shop owner Edwin Lee, sued the Federal Government of the United States following an assessment for unpaid Social Security taxes worth $27,000 over a seven year period, claiming that the imposition of such taxes violated his freedom of conscience. In 1965, United States Congress had previously legislated that members of certain religious groups, including as the Old Order Amish, were exempt from Social Security taxes if they were self-employed. The District Court had found in favor of the appellant.

== Ruling ==
Chief Justice Warren Burger delivered the opinion of the Court, with Justices Brennan, White, Marshall, Blackmun, Powell, Rehnquist, and O'Connor, joining, and Justice Stevens separately concurring.

The Court's opinion held that the tax imposed on employers to support the social security system must be uniformly applicable to all, except if the United States Congress explicitly provides otherwise. The Court's majority opinion explained its reasoning:

The conclusion that there is a conflict between the Amish faith and the obligations imposed by the social security system is only the beginning, however, and not the end of the inquiry. Not all burdens on religion are unconstitutional. See, e. g., Prince v. Massachusetts, 321 U.S. 158 (1944); Reynolds v. United States, 98 U.S. 145 (1879). The state may justify a limitation on religious liberty by showing that it is essential to accomplish an overriding governmental interest ... Congress and the courts have been sensitive to the needs flowing from the Free Exercise Clause, but every person cannot be shielded from all the burdens incident to exercising every aspect of the right to practice religious beliefs. When followers of a particular sect enter into commercial activity as a matter of choice, the limits they accept on their own conduct as a matter of conscience and faith are not to be superimposed on the statutory schemes which are binding on others in that activity. Granting an exemption from social security taxes to an employer operates to impose the employer's religious faith on the employees.

== Use as precedent ==
Lee was cited during oral arguments in Burwell v. Hobby Lobby (2014), a case about how the contraception requirement in the Patient Protection and Affordable Care Act affected closely held for-profit corporations.

== See also ==
- Religious Freedom Restoration Act
