= Zubik v. Burwell =

- Supreme Court of the United States

Original jurisdiction Argued March 23, 2016 Decided May 16, 2016
- Full case name: David A. Zubik et al. v. Sylvia Burwell, Secretary of Health and Human Services, et al.
- Docket no.: 14-1418
- Citations: 578 U.S. 403 (more) 136 S. Ct. 1557; 194 L. Ed. 2d 696
- Opinion announcement: Opinion announcement

Outcome
- Remanded the cases to lower courts for reconsideration in light of the positions asserted by the parties in their supplemental briefs.

Court membership
- Chief Justice John Roberts Associate Justices Anthony Kennedy · Clarence Thomas; Ruth Bader Ginsburg · Stephen Breyer; Samuel Alito · Sonia Sotomayor; Elena Kagan

Case opinions
- Per curiam
- Concurrence: Sotomayor, joined by Ginsburg

Laws applied
- Affordable Care Act, Religious Freedom Restoration Act

Zubik v. Burwell, 578 U.S. 403 (2016), was a case before the United States Supreme Court on whether religious institutions other than churches should be exempt from the contraceptive mandate, a regulation adopted by the United States Department of Health and Human Services (HHS) under the Affordable Care Act (ACA) that requires non-church employers to cover certain contraceptives for their female employees. Churches are already exempt under those regulations. On May 16, 2016, the Supreme Court vacated the Court of Appeals ruling in Zubik v. Burwell and the six cases it had consolidated under that title and returned them to their respective courts of appeals for reconsideration.

== Background ==
=== Federal law ===
EBSA Form 700, version as of January 1, 2014

==== Religious Freedom Restoration Act ====
The United States Supreme Court ruled in Employment Division v. Smith (1990) that a person may not defy "neutral laws of general applicability" (Note: The meaning of "neutral law of general applicability" was elaborated by the court in 1993. (See Church of the Lukumi Babalu Aye, Inc. v. Hialeah, 508 U.S. 520 (1993), at 531-547.)) even as an expression of religious belief. "To permit this", wrote Justice Scalia, citing the 1878 Reynolds v. United States decision, "would make the professed doctrines of religious belief superior to the law of the land, and in effect to permit every citizen to become a law unto himself." He wrote that generally applicable laws do not have to meet the standard of strict scrutiny, because such a requirement would create "a private right to ignore generally applicable laws". Strict scrutiny would require a law to be the least restrictive means of furthering a compelling government interest.

In 1993, the U.S. Congress responded by passing the Religious Freedom Restoration Act (RFRA), requiring strict scrutiny when a neutral law of general applicability "substantially burden[s] a person's (Note: The Dictionary Act defines the word 'person' in any act of Congress to include corporations.) exercise of religion". The RFRA was amended in 2000 by the Religious Land Use and Institutionalized Persons Act (RLUIPA) to redefine the exercise of religion as any exercise of religion, "whether or not compelled by, or central to, a system of religious belief", which is to be "construed in favor of a broad protection of religious exercise, to the maximum extent permitted by the terms of this chapter and the Constitution". The Supreme Court upheld the constitutionality of the RFRA as applied to federal statutes in Gonzales v. O Centro Espirita in 2006.

==== Affordable Care Act ====
Most Americans are covered by employer-sponsored health insurance. In 2010, Congress passed the Affordable Care Act (ACA), which relies on the Health Resources and Services Administration (HRSA), part of the Department of Health and Human Services (HHS), to specify what kinds of preventive care for women should be covered in certain employer-based health plans. The HRSA decided that all twenty contraceptives approved by the U.S. Food and Drug Administration (FDA) should be covered. Employers that refuse are fined $100 per individual per day, or they can replace their health coverage with higher wages and a calibrated tax.

HHS exempted churches (including houses of worship, such as synagogues and mosques) and their integrated auxiliaries, associations of churches, and any religious order that engages exclusively in religious activity. These are the same groups exempt from filing IRS Form 990. Employers providing grandfathered plans (plans that have not had specific changes before March 23, 2010), and employers with fewer than 50 employees were also exempt. Other non-profit organizations that object to any required contraception coverage could file an EBSA form 700 with their insurance company notifying them of the non-profit's objection. The insurance company would then provide the contraceptive coverage directly to employees without any involvement of the employer, including any distribution of literature or extra payments by the employer.

=== Initial litigation ===
The Little Sisters of the Poor, a Catholic religious order, runs over 25 homes for low-income elderly in the United States and therefore is not automatically exempt from the contraceptive mandate. It objected to filing Form 700 because it believed that doing so would make the order complicit in providing contraception, a sin under Catholic doctrine. On December 31, 2013, the day before the filing requirement was to come into effect, Supreme Court Justice Sonia Sotomayor granted a temporary injunction to the Little Sisters of the Poor, allowing them to simply inform the Secretary of Health and Human Services of their objections, pending resolution of the case. Other religious institutions filed similar objections.

On February 15, 2012, Priests for Life v. HHS was filed in the U.S. District Court for the Eastern District of New York challenging the constitutionality of the contraceptive mandate on behalf of Priests for Life, a national, Catholic, pro-life organization based in New York City. The case was dismissed by U.S. District Court Judge Frederic Block for lack of ripeness because the new compromise regulations were not yet finalized.

On June 30, 2014, the Supreme Court ruled 5 to 4 in Burwell v. Hobby Lobby Stores, Inc. that under the Religious Freedom Restoration Act (RFRA), closely held for-profit corporations are exempt from the contraceptive mandate, if they object on religious grounds, because the accommodation offered to objecting non-profits would be a less restrictive way to achieve the ACA's interest.

On July 3, 2014, the Supreme Court granted a temporary exemption to the approach it suggested as a less restrictive alternative in Hobby Lobby, where the plaintiffs would send an EBSA Form 700 to its insurance issuer, which would pay for the contraception. In an unsigned emergency injunction for Wheaton College in Illinois, the court said that instead of notifying its insurance issuer, Wheaton can notify the government. Once notified, the government should notify the issuer. Wheaton believed that by transferring the obligation to cover contraceptives to its insurance issuer, it was triggering that obligation. The emergency injunction does not constitute a ruling on the merits of Wheaton's religious objection. The court said "Nothing in this interim order affects the ability of the applicant's employees and students to obtain, without cost, the full range of FDA approved contraceptives." In a 15-page dissent, joined by the other two female jurists on the court, Justice Sotomayor criticized the majority's reasoning and distinguished it from the situation with the Little Sisters of the Poor. A revised version of EBSA Form 700, effective August 2014, says "[a]s an alternative to using this form, an eligible organization may provide notice to the Secretary of Health and Human Services that the eligible organization has a religious objection to providing coverage for all or a subset of contraceptive services..."

Eight appeals courts upheld the ACA mandate for non-church religious institutions. Only the Eighth Circuit Court of Appeals ruled the other way, upholding the challenge by religious non-profit institutions in September 2015 in two cases, Sharpe Holdings v. HHS and Dordt College v. Burwell.

== Litigation in the U.S. Supreme Court ==
On November 6, 2015, the U.S. Supreme Court consolidated seven cases, all challenges to the contraceptive mandate. The case is titled Zubik v. Burwell and the cases consolidated under that title and the Court of Appeals that issued the decision being appealed were:

- Zubik v. Burwell (Third Circuit Court of Appeals)
- Geneva College v. Burwell (Third Circuit Court of Appeals)
- East Texas Baptist University v. Burwell (Fifth Circuit Court of Appeals)
- Little Sisters of the Poor Home for the Aged v. Burwell (Tenth Circuit Court of Appeals)
- Southern Nazarene University v. Burwell (Tenth Circuit Court of Appeals)
- Priests for Life v. Burwell (District of Columbia Circuit)
- Roman Catholic Archbishop of Washington v. Burwell (District of Columbia Circuit)

=== Oral arguments ===
Oral arguments were heard on March 23, 2016. Issues discussed included how and where to draw the line between exempt churches and other religious non-profits and whether the government was "hijacking" the insurance plans created by the non-profits to achieve the government's goals. Because of Justice Antonin Scalia's death in February, only eight justices heard the arguments, raising the possibility of an equally divided court, which would leave the appeals court rulings in force in their respective jurisdictions.

=== Supplemental briefing ===
On March 29 the Court directed the parties "to file supplemental briefs that address whether and how contraceptive coverage may be obtained by petitioners' employees through petitioners's insurance companies, but in a way that does not require any involvement of petitioners beyond their own decision to provide health insurance without contraceptive coverage to their employees." The Court suggested a possible scheme where petitioners would obtain insurance without contraceptive coverage and "petitioners' insurance company, aware that petitioners are not providing certain contraceptive coverage on religious grounds, would separately notify petitioners' employees that the insurance company will provide cost-free contraceptive coverage, and that such coverage is not paid for by petitioners and is not provided through petitioners's health plan." Also, of particular interest to the court was the question raised in an amicus brief of conscientious objection suggesting that courts may not usurp the right of religious adherents to determine their own views regarding moral complicity.

=== Ruling ===
On May 16, 2016, the Court issued a per curiam decision that vacated the decisions of the Circuit Courts of Appeals and remanded the cases to those courts for reconsideration in light of the "positions asserted by the parties in their supplemental briefs". Because the Petitioners agreed that "their religious exercise is not infringed where they 'need to do nothing more than contract for a plan that does not include coverage for some or all forms of contraception'", the Court held that the parties should be given an opportunity to clarify and refine how this approach would work in practice and to "resolve any outstanding issues". In a departure from the usual treatment of per curiam rulings, Chief Justice Roberts read the ruling aloud in court. The Supreme Court expressed "no view on the merits of the cases." In a concurring opinion, Justice Sotomayor, joined by Justice Ginsburg, noted that in earlier cases "some lower courts have ignored those instructions" and cautioned lower courts not to read any signals in the Supreme Court's actions in this case. She cited as an example the Eighth Circuit opinion in Sharpe Holdings, the only Court of Appeals decision that had upheld the position taken by the Zubik plaintiffs.

== Further litigation ==
On May 23 the Supreme Court returned two additional cases back to their respective Courts of Appeals for reconsideration in light of the filings in Zubik: Catholic Healthcare System v. Burwell (Second Circuit Court of Appeals) and Michigan Catholic Conference v. Burwell (Sixth Circuit Court of Appeals).

On July 21 the Obama administration asked the Courts of Appeals considering the Zubik cases to allow 65 days for the government to seek advice from third parties on all aspects of the legal dispute, from technical and practical implementation issues to religious and legal insight. It published a general appeal for comment and advice from "all interested stakeholders" in the Federal Register the next day.

When Donald Trump took over as President in 2017, one of the first Executive Orders he enacted was to order the HHS to issue a ruling to allow for conscientious objections to the mandate, which was published in late 2017 and allowed for for-profit religious organizations to claim exemption from the mandate on religious or moral grounds. This led to numerous states pursuing further legal action on the new rules that culminated in another Supreme Court case, Little Sisters of the Poor Saints Peter and Paul Home v. Pennsylvania, which was heard in May 2020. The Supreme Court upheld the rules on a 7–2 decision issued in July 2020.

== See also ==
- Supreme Court cases cited in oral arguments on the limits of religious liberty exemptions to general laws:
  - Lyng v. Northwest Indian Cemetery Protective Ass'n
  - Bowen v. Roy
  - Wisconsin v. Yoder
- David Zubik
- Sylvia Mathews Burwell
- Constitutional challenges to the Patient Protection and Affordable Care Act
