= Conestoga Wood Specialties =

Manufacturer of wood products in the US

- Type: Private
- Industry: Furniture
- Founded: East Earl, Pennsylvania (1964)
- Founder: Norman and Samuel Hahn
- Headquarters: East Earl, Pennsylvania, United States
- Key people: Anthony Hahn, CEO
- Website: www.conestogawood.com

Conestoga Wood Specialties is a manufacturer of wood doors and components for kitchen, bath and furniture, based in East Earl, Pennsylvania. They have four factories, located in North Carolina and Pennsylvania, employing about 1,200 people.

The company was founded in 1964 by brothers Norman and Samuel Hahn and several others, working from a garage in East Earl, Pennsylvania. The company is still owned by Norman Hahn and other members of the Hahn family, who are of Pennsylvania Dutch heritage and belong to the Mennonite community. Anthony Hahn (son of Norman Hahn) is currently the CEO. One of their plants is across the road from that original garage, at 245 Reading Road. They later added plants in Beavertown, Pennsylvania; Darlington, Maryland (closed in late 2007); Mountain View, Arkansas (closed); Jacksonville, Arkansas (closed); Kenly, North Carolina; Kent, Washington (closed) and Tooele, Utah (closed).

Although the company deals both with manufacturers ordering thousands of pieces at a time, and custom shops needing one-off orders, they deal only with the trade, declining retail orders.

They are one of the largest employers of all manufacturing companies in Lancaster County, Pennsylvania.

== Opposition to the Affordable Care Act ==
The Affordable Care Act, enacted on March 23, 2010, includes a provision that mandates health insurance cover “additional preventive care and screenings” for women. The Health Resources and Services Administration (HRSA) issued a set of guidelines in the mandate, which concludes access to contraception is medically necessary to “ensure women’s health and well-being.”

Norman Hahn, owner of Conestoga Wood Specialties Corp., objected to the new provisions set forth, and claimed it would be "sinful and immoral" to pay for or support certain forms of contraception, such as Plan B, as required by compliance with the Affordable Care Act. Although Conestoga Wood Specialities Corp. complied with the mandate to avoid fines of up to $95,000 per day, it filed suit for an exemption.

In July 2013, the Third Circuit Court of Appeals upheld a lower court ruling that the Conestoga Wood Specialities Corp. did not qualify for an exemption from providing coverage based on religious beliefs. In September 2013, Conestoga Wood Specialties successfully appealed the ruling to the U.S. Supreme Court, which consolidated the case with Burwell v. Hobby Lobby. Two dozen amicus briefs were filed in support of the government, and five dozen in support of the companies. A friend-of-the-court brief filed in Conestoga Wood Specialties Corp. v. Burwell argued that corporations do not have religions, and for-profit corporations cannot claim exemptions from the law based on the religions of their stockholders.

On June 30, 2014, Associate Justice Samuel Alito delivered the judgment of the court. The Supreme Court ruled in favor of Hobby Lobby and Conestoga, finding that closely held for-profit corporations have free exercise of religion under the Religious Freedom Restoration Act. The court responded by saying, "Congress, in enacting RFRA, took the position that 'the compelling interest test as set forth in prior Federal court rulings is a workable test for striking sensible balances between religious liberty and competing prior governmental interests'.
