= Burwell v. Hobby Lobby Stores, Inc. =

Burwell v. Hobby Lobby
- Supreme Court of the United States

Argued March 25, 2014 Decided June 30, 2014
- Full case name: Sylvia Burwell, Secretary of Health and Human Services, et al., Petitioners v. Hobby Lobby Stores, Inc., Mardel, Inc., David Green, Barbara Green, Steve Green, Mart Green, and Darsee Lett; Conestoga Wood Specialties Corporation, et al., Petitioners v. Sylvia Burwell, Secretary of Health and Human Services, et al.
- Docket nos.: 13-354; 13-356
- Citations: 573 U.S. 682 (more) 134 S. Ct. 2751; 189 L. Ed. 2d 675; 2014 U.S. LEXIS 4505; 123 Fair Empl. Prac. Cas. (BNA) 621
- Argument: Oral argument

Case history
- Prior: denying preliminary injunction, 870 F. Supp. 2d 1278 (W.D. Okla. 2012), denying injunction pending appeal, 133 S. Ct. 641 (Sotomayor, Circuit Justice), reversing and remanding, 723 F.3d 1114 (10th Cir. 2013).
- Subsequent: issuing injunction, No. CIV-12-1000-HE (W.D. Okla. Nov. 19, 2014).

Questions presented
- Does the Religious Freedom Restoration Act of 1993 allow a for-profit company to deny its employees health coverage of contraception to which the employees would otherwise be entitled based on the religious objections of the company's owners?

Holding
- As applied to privately held for-profit corporations, a contraceptive mandate under the Department of Health and Human Services regulations violate the Religious Freedom Restoration Act of 1993 because they are substantial burdens under that law. Assuming that guaranteeing cost-free access to the four challenged contraceptive methods is a compelling governmental interest, the government must show that such a mandate is the least restrictive means of furthering that interest.

Court membership
- Chief Justice John Roberts Associate Justices Antonin Scalia · Anthony Kennedy; Clarence Thomas · Ruth Bader Ginsburg; Stephen Breyer · Samuel Alito; Sonia Sotomayor · Elena Kagan

Case opinions
- Majority: Alito, joined by Roberts, Scalia, Kennedy, Thomas
- Concurrence: Kennedy
- Dissent: Ginsburg, joined by Sotomayor; Breyer, Kagan (all but Part III–C–1)
- Dissent: Breyer and Kagan

Laws applied
- Affordable Care Act, Religious Freedom Restoration Act, U.S. Const. amend. I

Burwell v. Hobby Lobby Stores, Inc., 573 U.S. 682 (2014), is a landmark decision in United States corporate law by the United States Supreme Court allowing privately held for-profit corporations to be exempt from a regulation that its owners religiously object to, if there is a less restrictive means of furthering the law's interest, pursuant to the Religious Freedom Restoration Act of 1993. It is the first time that the Court has recognized a for-profit corporation's claim of religious belief, but it is limited to privately held corporations. (Note: "Privately held" corporations are defined by the Internal Revenue Service as those which a) have more than 50% of the value of their outstanding stock owned (directly or indirectly) by 5 or fewer individuals at any time during the last half of the tax year; and b) are not personal service corporations. By this definition, approximately 90% of U.S. corporations are "privately held", and approximately 52% of the U.S. workforce is employed by privately held corporations. See Blake 2014, The Washington Post.) The decision does not address whether such corporations are protected by the Free Exercise Clause of the First Amendment of the Constitution.

For such companies, the Court's majority directly struck down the contraceptive mandate, a regulation adopted by the United States Department of Health and Human Services (HHS) under the Affordable Care Act (ACA) requiring employers to cover certain contraceptives for their female employees, by a 5–4 vote. The Court said that the mandate was not the least restrictive way to ensure access to contraceptive care, noting that a less restrictive alternative was being provided for religious non-profits, until the Court issued an injunction 3 days later, effectively ending said alternative, replacing it with a government-sponsored alternative for any female employees of privately held corporations that do not wish to provide birth control. The ruling is considered to be part of the political controversy regarding the Affordable Care Act in the United States.

== Background ==
=== Federal law ===
==== Religious Freedom Restoration Act ====
The United States Supreme Court ruled in Employment Division v. Smith (1990) that a person may not defy neutral laws of general applicability (Note: The meaning of neutral law of general applicability was elaborated by the court in 1993.) even as an expression of religious belief. "To permit this," wrote Justice Scalia, citing the 1878 Reynolds v. United States decision, "would make the professed doctrines of religious belief superior to the law of the land, and in effect to permit every citizen to become a law unto himself. " He wrote that generally applicable laws do not have to meet the standard of strict scrutiny, because such a requirement would create "a private right to ignore generally applicable laws". Strict scrutiny would require a law to be the least restrictive means of furthering a compelling government interest.

In 1993, the US Congress responded by passing the Religious Freedom Restoration Act (RFRA), requiring strict scrutiny when a neutral law of general applicability "substantially burden[s] a person's (Note: The Dictionary Act defines the word 'person' in any act of Congress to include corporations.) exercise of religion". The RFRA was amended in 2000 by the Religious Land Use and Institutionalized Persons Act (RLUIPA) to redefine exercise of religion as any exercise of religion, "whether or not compelled by, or central to, a system of religious belief", which is to be "construed in favor of a broad protection of religious exercise, to the maximum extent permitted by the terms of this chapter and the Constitution". The Supreme Court upheld the constitutionality of the RFRA as applied to federal statutes in Gonzales v. O Centro Espirita in 2006.

==== Affordable Care Act ====
Of those Americans who have health insurance, most are covered by employer-sponsored health insurance. In 2010, Congress passed the Affordable Care Act (ACA), which relies on the Health Resources and Services Administration (HRSA), part of the Department of Health and Human Services (HHS), to specify what kinds of preventive care for women should be covered in certain employer-based health plans. HHS exempted religious employers (churches and their integrated auxiliaries, associations of churches, and any religious order), non-profit organizations that object to any required contraception, employers providing grandfathered plans (that have not had specific changes before March 23, 2010), and employers with fewer than 50 employees. The HRSA decided that all twenty contraceptives approved by the U.S. Food and Drug Administration (FDA) should be covered. Companies that refuse are fined $100 per individual per day, or they can replace their health coverage with higher wages and a calibrated tax.

=== Hobby Lobby Stores and Conestoga Wood Specialties ===
Hobby Lobby is an arts and crafts company founded by billionaire David Green and owned by the Evangelical Christian Green family with about 21,000 employees. It provided health insurance covering the contraceptives Plan-B and Ella until it dropped its coverage in 2012, the year it filed its lawsuit. The Hobby Lobby case also involved Mardel Christian and Educational Supply, which is owned by Mart Green, one of David's sons.

Hobby Lobby's case was consolidated with another case by Conestoga Wood Specialties, a furniture company owned by the Mennonite Hahn family that has about 1,000 employees, represented by the Alliance Defending Freedom.

==== Specific contraceptives contested by plaintiffs ====
The plaintiffs believed that life began at conception, and objected to their businesses providing health insurance coverage to their female employees of four FDA-approved contraceptives that the plaintiffs believed prevented implantation of a fertilized egg. The plaintiffs believed the following forms of birth control constituted an abortion:

- Emergency contraceptive pills
  - levonorgestrel (sold under the brand name Plan B among others)
  - ulipristal acetate (sold under the brand name Ella among others)
- Intrauterine devices (IUDs)
  - copper IUDs (sold under the brand name ParaGard among others)
  - Hormonal IUDs (sold under the brand names Mirena and Skyla among others)

=== Lower court history ===
In September 2012, Hobby Lobby filed a lawsuit in the United States District Court for the Western District of Oklahoma against enforcement of the contraception rule based on the RFRA and the Free Exercise Clause of the First Amendment. On November 19, 2012, U.S. District Judge Joe L. Heaton denied Hobby Lobby's request for a preliminary injunction. On December 26, 2012, Justice Sonia Sotomayor issued an in-chambers opinion denying an injunction pending appeal. In March 2013, the United States Court of Appeals for the Tenth Circuit granted a hearing of the case. In June, the appeals court ruled that Hobby Lobby Stores, Inc. is a person who has religious freedom. Circuit Judge Timothy Tymkovich wrote for the five-judge en banc majority, over a three-judge dissent. Neil Gorsuch voted with the majority and also wrote an opinion on the case. The court ordered the government to stop enforcement of the contraception rule on Hobby Lobby and sent the case back to the district court, which granted preliminary injunction in July. In September, the government appealed to the U.S. Supreme Court.

Two other federal appeals courts ruled against the contraception coverage rule, while another two upheld it.

The case was previously titled Sebelius v. Hobby Lobby. Sylvia Burwell was automatically substituted as petitioner when she was approved by the United States Senate as the Secretary of Health and Human Services after being nominated by President Barack Obama to replace Kathleen Sebelius following Sebelius' resignation on April 10, 2014.

== U.S. Supreme Court consideration ==
=== Acceptance and briefs ===
On November 26, the Supreme Court accepted and consolidated the case with Conestoga Wood Specialties v. Sebelius. Two dozen amicus briefs support the government, and five dozen support the companies. American Freedom Law Center's brief argues that birth control harms women because men will only want them "for the satisfaction of [their] own desires." Another brief argues that the contraception rule leads to "the maximization of sexual activity". Two of the briefs oppose each other on the constitutionality of the RFRA. Two briefs that do not formally take sides oppose each other on whether the right to religion applies to corporations. One of those briefs argues that if shareholders are separated by the corporate veil from corporate liabilities, then their religious values are also separate from the corporation. It mentions the ruling in Domino's Pizza, Inc. v. McDonald made against the African American owner of JWM Investments whose contracts were breached due to racial discrimination. The brief argues that if JWM Investments could not suffer discrimination through its owner, then Hobby Lobby could not suffer religious burden through its owner. Two briefs were filed by LGBT groups concerned that future anti-discrimination laws would be pre-emptively harmed if employers could claim to be religiously exempt.

=== Argument and deliberation ===
Oral arguments were held on March 25, 2014, for 30 minutes more than the usual one hour. The three women in the court focused their questioning on Hobby Lobby's lawyer, Paul Clement, while the men focused on the administration's lawyer, Solicitor General Donald B. Verrilli Jr. Justice Sotomayor quoted the ruling from United States v. Lee (1982) saying that an employer can't deprive employees of a statutory right because of religious beliefs. Clement replied that Lee does not apply because it was a challenge against a tax rather than against a significant burden. Sotomayor said that instead of paying the burden of the penalty, Hobby Lobby could replace its health care with the equivalent expense of higher wages and a calibrated tax, which the government would use to pay for the employees' health care. Near the end of Clement's argument, Justice Kennedy expressed concern for the rights of the employees who may not agree with the religious beliefs of their employers. When Verrilli argued that the ruling in Cutter v. Wilkinson requires the court to weigh the impact on third parties in every RFRA case, Justice Scalia said that the RFRA does not require the court to balance the interest of the religious objector to the interest of other individuals. Verilli returned to Lee, saying that granting an exemption to an employer should not impose the employer's religious faith on the employees.

== Opinion of the Court ==
=== Majority opinion ===
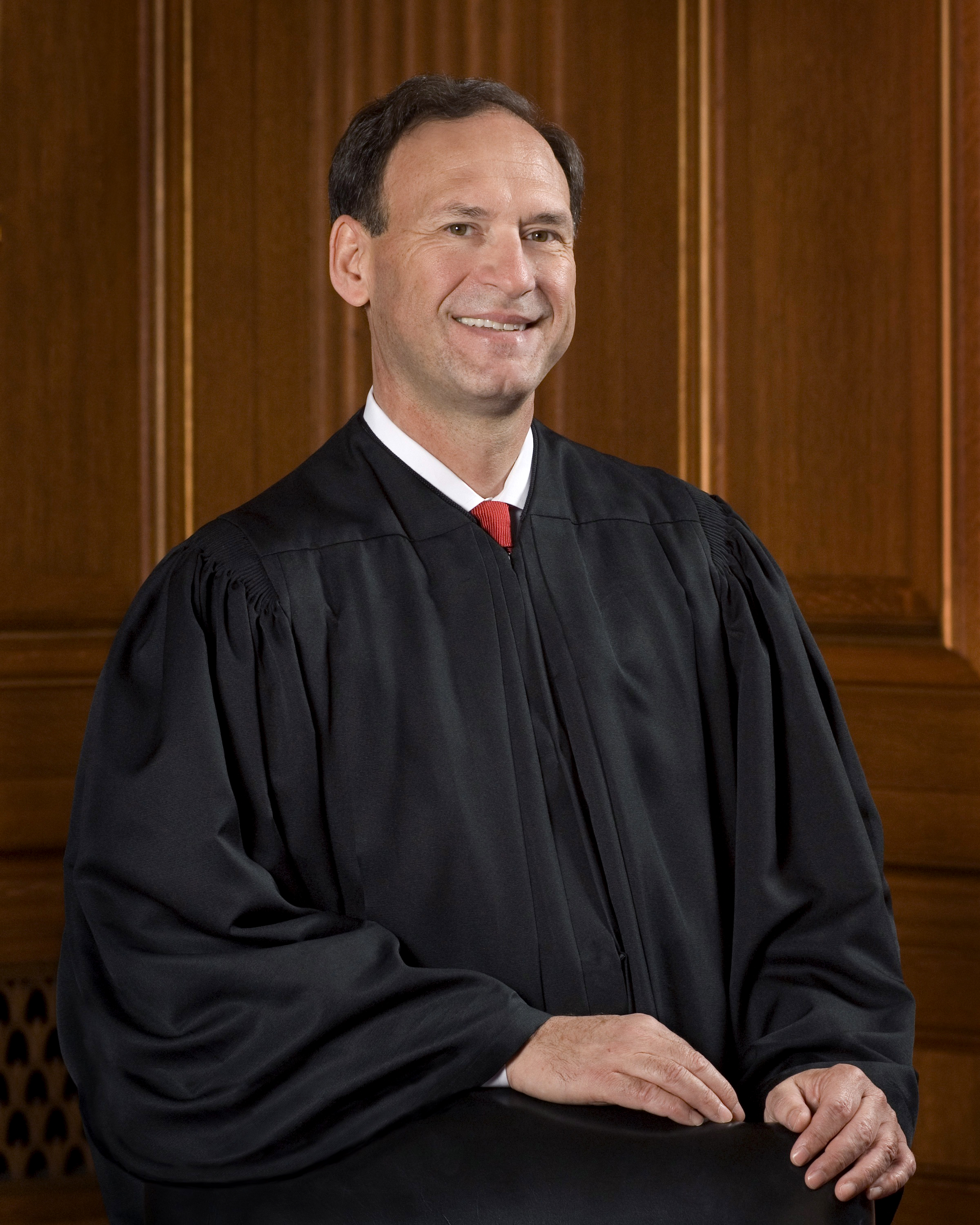
Justice Samuel Alito was the author of the Court's majority opinion.

On June 30, 2014, Associate Justice Samuel Alito delivered the judgment of the court. Four justices (Roberts, Scalia, Kennedy, and Thomas) joined him to strike down the HHS mandate, as applied to closely held corporations with religious objections, and to prevent the plaintiffs from being compelled to provide contraception under their healthcare plans. The ruling was based on statutory grounds, citing the RFRA, because the mandate was not the "least restrictive" method of implementing the government's interest. The ruling did not address Hobby Lobby's claims under the Free Exercise Clause of the First Amendment.

The Court argued that the purpose of extending rights to corporations is to protect the rights of shareholders, officers, and employees. It said that "allowing Hobby Lobby, Conestoga, and Mardel to assert RFRA claims protects the religious liberty of the Greens and the Hahns." The court found that for-profit corporations could be considered persons under the RFRA. It noted that the HHS treats nonprofit corporations as persons within the meaning of RFRA. The court stated, "no conceivable definition of the term includes natural persons and nonprofit corporations, but not for-profit corporations." Responding to lower court judges' suggestion that the purpose of for-profit corporations "is simply to make money," the Court said, "For-profit corporations, with ownership approval, support a wide variety of charitable causes, and it is not at all uncommon for such corporations to further humanitarian and other altruistic objectives." The Court rejected the contention that "the Nation lacks a tradition of exempting for-profit corporations from generally applicable laws," pointing to a federal statute from 1993 that exempted any covered health care entity from engaging in "certain activities related to abortion".

The Court held that the HHS contraception mandate substantially burdens the exercise of religion, rejecting an argument that the $2,000-per-employee penalty for dropping insurance coverage is less than the average cost of health insurance. Responding to HHS's argument that the provision of coverage does not itself result in destruction of embryos, the Court asserted that the argument dodges the substantial burden question that the Court is supposed to address. The Court added, citing Jesuit moral manuals, that the argument is also the religious question of the morality of enabling the immoral acts of others, to which HHS had provided "a binding national answer". The Court argued that federal courts should not answer religious questions because they would in effect be deciding whether certain beliefs are flawed. The Court argued that "companies would face a competitive disadvantage in retaining and attracting skilled workers," that increased wages for employees to buy individual coverage would be more costly than group health insurance, that any raise in wages would have to take income taxes into account, and that employers cannot deduct the penalty.

The Court found it unnecessary to adjudicate on whether the HHS contraceptive mandate furthers a compelling government interest and held that HHS has not shown that the mandate is "the least restrictive means of furthering that compelling interest". The Court argued that the most straightforward alternative would be "for the Government to assume the cost ..." and that HHS has not shown that it is not "a viable alternative". The Court said that the RFRA can "require creation of entirely new programs". The Court also pointed out that HHS already exempts any nonprofit organization from paying for any required contraception by allowing it to certify its religious objection to its insurance issuer, which must "[p]rovide separate payments for any contraceptive services required to be covered". However, the Court said the approach might not necessarily be the least restrictive alternative for all religious claims.

The Court concluded by addressing "the possibility that discrimination in hiring, for example on the basis of race, might be cloaked as religious practice to escape legal sanction". The Court said that their decision "provides no such shield", and that "prohibitions on racial discrimination are precisely tailored to achieve that critical goal." The Court also said that the requirement to pay taxes despite any religious objection is different from the contraceptive mandate because "there simply is no less restrictive alternative to the categorical requirement to pay taxes." The Court acknowledged the dissent's "worries about forcing the federal courts to apply RFRA to a host of claims made by litigants seeking a religious exemption from generally applicable laws ...", noting that this point was "made forcefully by the Court in Smith." The Court responded by saying, "Congress, in enacting RFRA, took the position that 'the compelling interest test as set forth in prior Federal court rulings is a workable test for striking sensible balances between religious liberty and competing prior governmental interests' ... The wisdom of Congress's judgment on this matter is not our concern. Our responsibility is to enforce RFRA as written, and under the standard that RFRA prescribes, the HHS contraceptive mandate is unlawful."

=== Concurring opinion ===
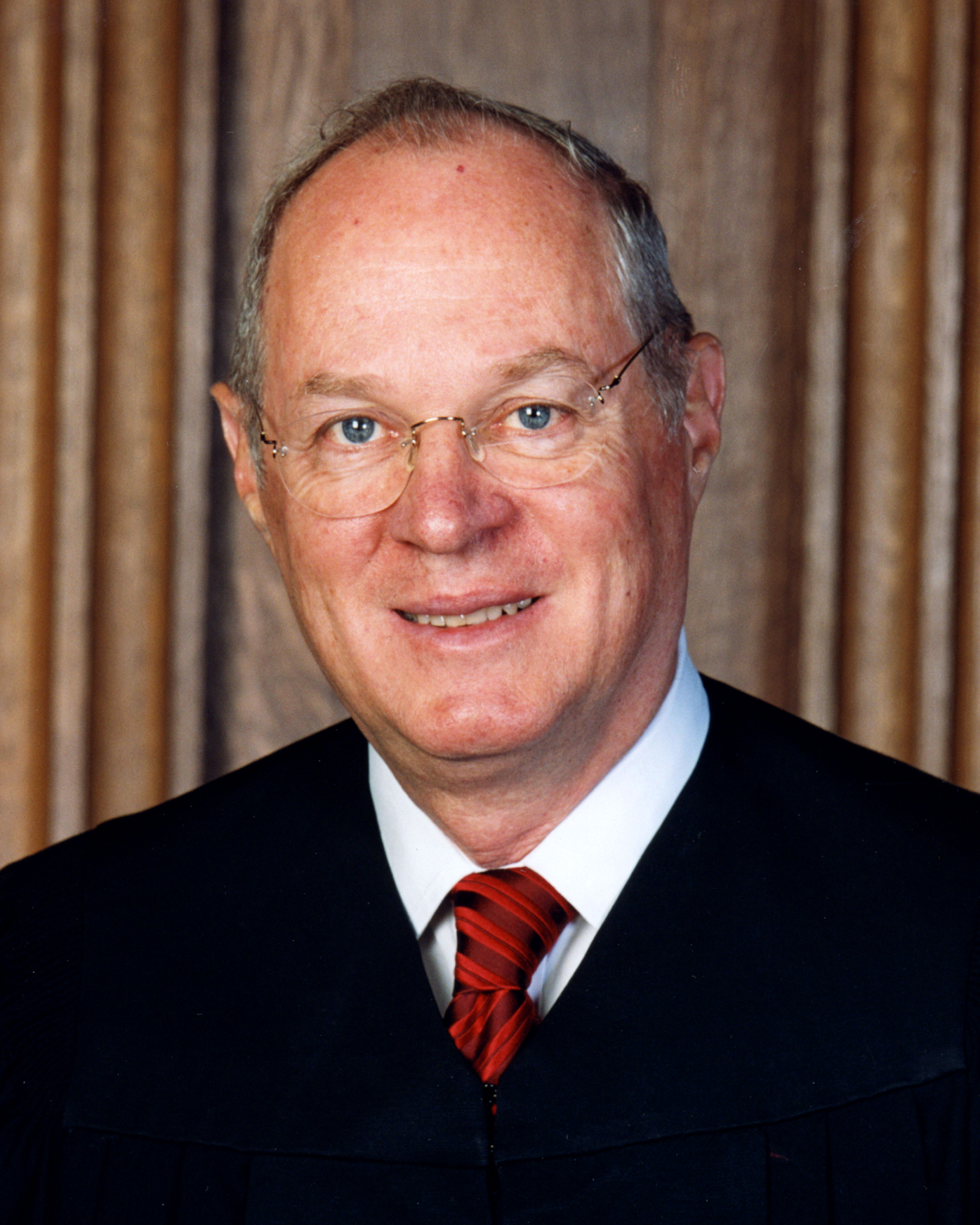
Justice Kennedy, joined in the majority opinion but also wrote a concurring opinion addressing the dissent.

Justice Anthony Kennedy wrote a concurring opinion, responding to the "respectful and powerful dissent", by emphasizing the limited nature of the ruling and saying that the government "makes the case that the mandate serves the Government's compelling interest in providing insurance coverage that is necessary to protect the health of female employees", but that the RFRA's least-restrictive way requirement is not met because "there is an existing, recognized, workable, and already-implemented framework to provide coverage," the one that HHS has devised for non-profit corporations with religious objections. "RFRA requires the Government to use this less restrictive means. As the Court explains, this existing model, designed precisely for this problem, might well suffice to distinguish the instant cases from many others in which it is more difficult and expensive to accommodate a governmental program to countless religious claims based on an alleged statutory right of free exercise." (Kennedy, J., concurring, pp. 3, 4)

=== Dissenting opinions ===
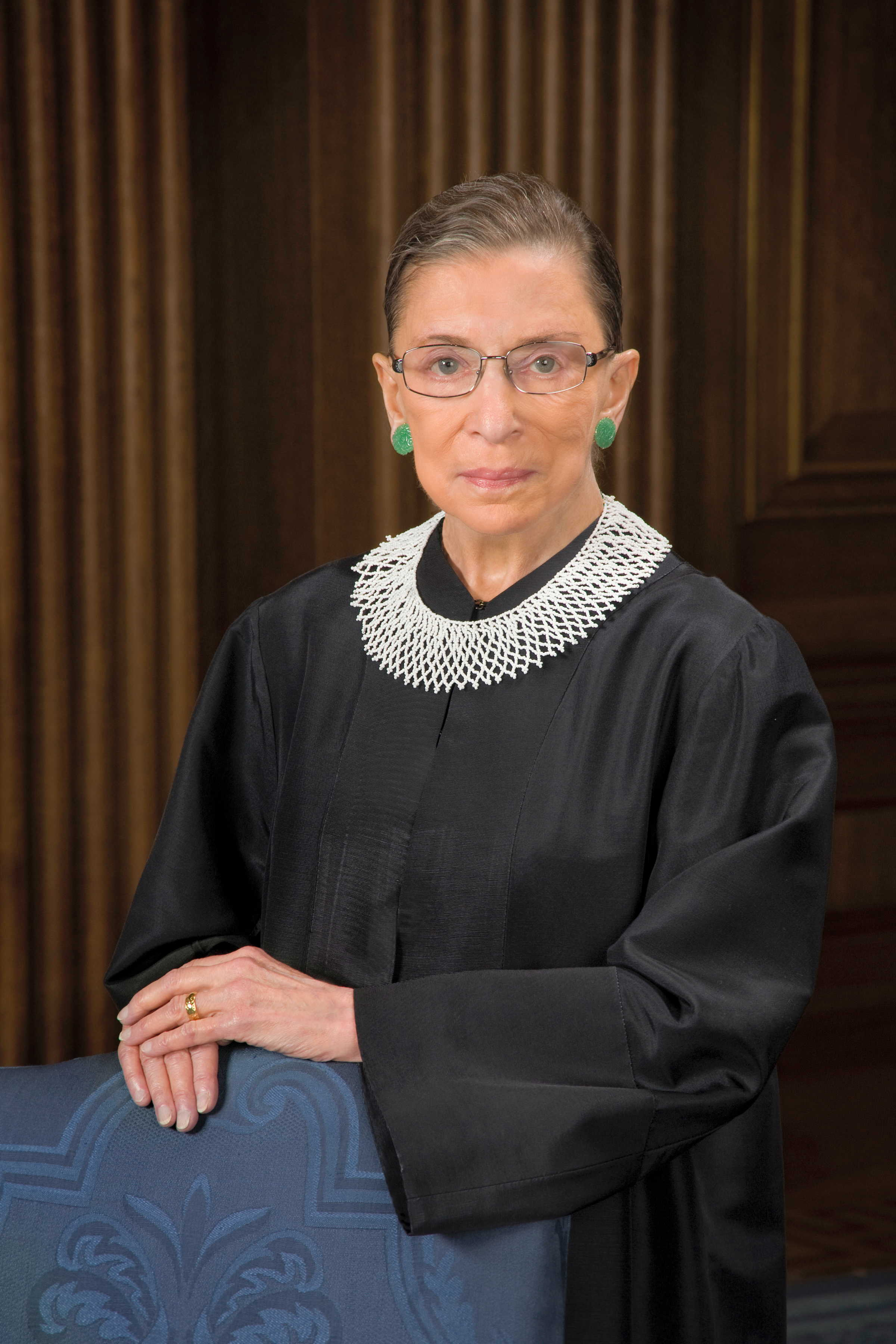
Justice Ruth Bader Ginsburg wrote a stern dissent disagreeing with the Court's reasoning.

Justice Ruth Bader Ginsburg delivered the primary dissent, which was joined by Justice Sotomayor in full and by Justices Breyer and Kagan as to all but Part III–C–1 on "whether a corporation qualifies as a 'person' capable of exercising religion". Ginsburg began, "In a decision of startling breadth, the Court holds that commercial enterprises, including corporations, along with partnerships and sole proprietorships, can opt out of any law (saving only tax laws) they judge incompatible with their sincerely held religious beliefs. ... Compelling governmental interests in uniform compliance with the law, and disadvantages that religion-based opt-outs impose on others, hold no sway, the Court decides, at least when there is a 'less restrictive alternative.' And such an alternative, the Court suggests, there always will be whenever, in lieu of tolling an enterprise claiming a religion-based exemption, the government, i.e., the general public, can pick up the tab."

She challenged the majority's unprecedented view of for-profit religion saying "Until this litigation, no decision of this Court recognized a for-profit corporation's qualification for a religious exemption from a generally applicable law, whether under the Free Exercise Clause or RFRA. The absence of such precedent is just what one would expect, for the exercise of religion is characteristic of natural persons, not artificial legal entities... Religious organizations exist to foster the interests of persons subscribing to the same religious faith. Not so of for-profit corporations. Workers who sustain the operations of those corporations commonly are not drawn from one religious community." Responding to the majority's argument that the government should "assume the cost" of contraceptives, Ginsburg said that "the nation's only dedicated source of federal funding for safety net family planning services ..." is not designed to absorb the unmet needs of those already insured. She noted that "a less restrictive alternative" has not been written into law by Congress. Ginsburg warns, "The Court, I fear, has ventured into a minefield ..."

Justices Breyer and Kagan wrote a one-paragraph dissenting opinion, saying that "the plaintiffs' challenge to the contraceptive coverage requirement fails on the merits" and that they "need not and do not decide whether either for-profit corporations or their owners may bring claims under the Religious Freedom Restoration Act of 1993."

== Reactions ==
Barbara Green, co-founder of Hobby Lobby, said "Today, the nation's highest court has reaffirmed the vital importance of religious liberty as one of our country's founding principles. The court's decision is a victory, not just for our family business, but for all who seek to live out their faith."

Conestoga CEO Anthony Hahn said, "Americans don't have to surrender their freedom when they open a family business."

=== Organizations ===
Conservative and pro-life groups praised the ruling. National Review said that the Supreme Court ruling "[led] Alliance Defending Freedom attorney Matt Bowman to call Hobby Lobby an 'inclusive decision' that advances everyone's freedom." Susan B. Anthony List President Marjorie Dannenfelser said, "This is a great victory for religious liberty – the bedrock of our founding. In living out our religious convictions, there are certain things we must not do. This is why we are at a watershed moment. Religious people will no longer be ordered to take action that our religion says we must not take." Family Research Council President Tony Perkins said, "The Supreme Court has delivered one of the most significant victories for religious freedom in our generation. We are thankful the Supreme Court agreed that the government went too far by mandating that family businesses owners must violate their consciences under threat of crippling fines." The U.S. Conference of Catholic Bishops said, "We welcome the Supreme Court's decision to recognize that Americans can continue to follow their faith when they run a family business ... Now is the time to redouble our efforts to build a culture that fully respects religious freedom."

Pro-choice and civil-liberties groups criticized the ruling. Cecile Richards, president of the Planned Parenthood Action Fund, said, "Today, the Supreme Court ruled against American women and families, giving bosses the right to discriminate against women and deny their employees access to birth control coverage. This is a deeply disappointing and troubling ruling that will prevent some women, especially those working hourly-wage jobs and struggling to make ends meet, from getting birth control." Deputy legal director of the American Civil Liberties Union Louise Melling said, "This is a deeply troubling decision. For the first time, the highest court in the country has said that business owners can use their religious beliefs to deny their employees a benefit that they are guaranteed by law."

In an editorial, the New England Journal of Medicine called the decision "a setback for both the ACA's foundational goal of access to universal health care and for women's health care specifically", voicing concern that "in assessing the competing claims about abortion and birth control, the Court's majority focused on the religious claims of the corporations without discussing scientific or medical opinions." In JAMA Internal Medicine, Alta Charo wrote that "consistent with a disturbing trend among courts and legislatures to misstate or misuse scientific information in the context of women's reproductive rights and health, the Supreme Court's decision ignored the well-accepted distinction between contraception and abortion." The American Congress of Obstetricians and Gynecologists, representing 90% of U.S. board-certified gynecologists, supported a bill to overturn the Hobby Lobby ruling.

=== Government ===
White House spokesman Josh Earnest said, "Congress needs to take action to solve this problem that's been created and the administration stands ready to work with them to do so. President Obama believes that women should make personal health care decisions for themselves, rather than their bosses deciding for them. Today's decision jeopardizes the health of women that are employed by these companies."

Senate Majority Leader Harry Reid (D-Nev.) said, "If the Supreme Court will not protect women's access to health care, then Democrats will. We will continue to fight to preserve women's access to contraceptive coverage and keep bosses out of the examination room."

Senate Minority Leader Mitch McConnell said, "[T]he Obama administration cannot trample on the religious freedoms that Americans hold dear."

Senator Chuck Schumer (D-NY), who introduced the RFRA in 1993, said his law "was not intended to extend the same protection to for-profit corporations, whose very purpose is to profit from the open market."

Speaker of the House John Boehner (R-Ohio) said, "The mandate overturned today would have required for-profit companies to choose between violating their constitutionally-protected faith or paying crippling fines, which would have forced them to lay off employees or close their doors."

House minority leader Nancy Pelosi (D-CA) said, "Although the Court restricted their ruling to 'closely held' companies, this ruling will immediately affect the lives of millions of women across the country. Over 90 percent of America's businesses are 'closely held', including such large employers as Koch Industries and Bechtel. Women should not be forced to jump through extra hoops to secure the fundamental health care they need. Allowing employers and CEOs to limit the health care available to employees is a gross violation of their workers' religious rights. It's just not her boss' business."

Senator Ted Cruz (R-Tex.) said, "Today's victory in the Hobby Lobby case is terrific news—but now is no time to rest. We cannot rely on the courts alone to defend our religious liberty."

Senator Orrin Hatch (R-Utah) said, "I applaud the Supreme Court's decision to protect the religious freedom of all Americans, both individually and collectively. The notion that religious freedom belongs only to some, and even then only in private, defies our nation's traditions, our laws, and our Constitution. And as the Supreme Court rightfully said today, the Religious Freedom Restoration Act could not have been clearer in saying religious liberty of all Americans must be equally protected and not unnecessarily burdened."

Rep. Michele Bachmann (R-Minn) said, "I am extremely encouraged by today's Supreme Court decision to uphold the religious liberty rights of the Green family of Hobby Lobby."

== Aftermath ==
=== Cases following SCOTUS ruling ===
Forbes reported that following the ruling in Burwell v. Hobby Lobby, "the Supreme Court vacated the judgment against Eden Foods and sent the case back to the U.S. Court of Appeals for the Sixth Circuit for further consideration."

On November 6, 2015, the Supreme Court of the United States decided it will hear arguments for the case of Zubik v. Burwell combined with six other challenges—including Priests for Life v. Burwell, Southern Nazarene University v. Burwell, Geneva College v. Burwell, Roman Catholic Archbishop of Washington v. Burwell, East Texas Baptist University v. Burwell, Little Sisters of the Poor Home for the Aged v. Burwell—to the contraceptive mandate of Obamacare.

=== Wheaton College order ===
On July 3, 2014, the Supreme Court granted a temporary exemption to the approach it suggested as a less restrictive alternative in Hobby Lobby, where the plaintiffs would send a form (EBSA Form 700) to its insurance issuer, which would pay for the contraception. In an unsigned emergency injunction for Wheaton College in Illinois, the court said that instead of notifying its insurance issuer, Wheaton can notify the government. Once notified, the government should notify the issuer. Wheaton believed that by transferring the obligation to cover contraceptives to its insurance issuer, it was triggering that obligation. The emergency injunction does not constitute a ruling on the merits of Wheaton's religious objection. The court said "Nothing in this interim order affects the ability of the applicant's employees and students to obtain, without cost, the full range of FDA approved contraceptives."

In a 15-page dissent joined by the other two women on the court, Justice Sonia Sotomayor criticized the majority's reasoning: "Wheaton's application comes nowhere near the high bar necessary to warrant an emergency injunction from this court ... The court's actions in this case create unnecessary costs and layers of bureaucracy, and they ignore a simple truth: The government must be allowed to handle the basic tasks of public administration in a manner that comports with common sense."

The Supreme Court Justice Sotomayor granted a similar temporary injunction to the Little Sisters of the Poor at the end of 2013, just before the mandate was to go into effect.

In dueling commentaries between regular SCOTUSblog contributor Marty Lederman and co-founder Tom Goldstein, Lederman argued that only Form 700 can require an insurance provider to pay for contraception coverage. Goldstein argued that an existing regulation allows the government to specify an alternative to Form 700. He pointed out that "the Court didn't accept Wheaton's most aggressive argument" that it cannot be required to do anything. He said that Justice Kennedy's concurrence is controlling and makes clear that the RFRA is not violated by requiring Wheaton to notify the government.

A revised version of EBSA Form 700, effective August 2014, says "[a]s an alternative to using this form, an eligible organization may provide notice to the Secretary of Health and Human Services that the eligible organization has a religious objection to providing coverage for all or a subset of contraceptive services ...".

=== Possible leak ===
In November 2022, The New York Times reported on a possible leak of the Hobby Lobby decision about two weeks prior to its formal announcement; this story was published following the leak and decision of Dobbs v. Jackson Women's Health Organization in June 2022 which overturned Roe v. Wade on abortion rights. Reverend Rob Schneck wrote to both Chief Justice John Roberts and to the Times stating that he had been told of which way Hobby Lobby was to be decided though a close associate after Schneck and his wife had a dinner party with Alito and his wife. At the time, Schneck used that information to inform Hobby Lobby and other religious organizations to prepare for the formal announcement of the decision. Schneck had opted to reveal this information in 2022 to aid in the investigation of the Dobbs decision leak. In 2011 through their connection to the Historical Society, Hobby Lobby's owners attended a Christmas party in Supreme Court chambers shortly before litigation was initiated which became Burwell v. Hobby Lobby Stores, Inc.

== Implications ==
=== Religious exemption from laws that apply to the general public ===
Although the court stated clearly that the decision is limited to the contraceptive mandate (Syllabus p. 4-5), the ruling is seen to have consequences extending far beyond contraception. Walter Dellinger, former acting solicitor general said, "for the first time, commercial enterprises could successfully claim religious exemptions from laws that govern everyone else." Fifteen states had filed a brief arguing that businesses would be able to deny coverage for transfusions, stem cell treatments, and psychiatric care. In line with the dissenting opinion, The American Prospect asked, "[W]ill the taxpayers have to send a check to employees if employers feel that minimum wage laws violate their religious beliefs?" Jonathan Rauch, a senior fellow at the Brookings Institution, said that objections to paying health benefits for same-sex spouses will get traction. The National Gay and Lesbian Task Force (NGLT) and the National Center for Lesbian Rights withdrew their support for the Employment Non-Discrimination Act (ENDA) passed by the Senate, saying that its religious exemptions would allow companies to fire or refuse to hire LGBT workers in light of the Hobby Lobby ruling. NGLT executive director Rea Carey said, "We do not take this move lightly. We've been pushing for this bill for 20 years."

Such concerns are focused on the court's application of the federal RFRA law and were driven by national controversy over a state RFRA amendment bill in Arizona. Douglas Laycock, law professor at the University of Virginia, said, "The whole secular left has decided" that RFRA laws "are very dangerous because they care so much more about the contraception cases and gay rights." He said RFRA laws are mischaracterized because they do not dictate outcomes favoring religious objectors, they only require courts to use the highest standard of scrutiny on any law challenged.

In 2021, Senator Cory Booker introduced a bill called the Do No Harm Act to reverse Burwell v. Hobby Lobby.

As of April 2022, there is an expectation that "Hobby Lobby 2.0" is forthcoming should President Biden pass changes to Obamacare regarding extensions for protections for trans people and the interpretation of discrimination on the basis of sex.

=== Imposition of religious beliefs onto others ===
Ian Millhiser from Vox.com argued that as a general rule in religious liberty cases prior to the Hobby Lobby decision religion can't be used to diminish the rights of others. He pointed to the 1982 U.S. Supreme Court case United States v. Lee (1982) (1982) in which the Court declared "when followers of a particular sect enter into commercial activity as a matter of choice, the limits they accept on their own conduct as a matter of conscience and faith are not to be superimposed on the statutory schemes which are binding on others in that activity." According to Millhiser the Hobby Lobby decision marks the first time "rights of religious believers could trump the rights of others." Marcia Greenberger, co-president of the National Women's Law Center, argued in the same direction Millhiser by saying that the Supreme Court has never ruled that companies have religious beliefs and that "it has never held that religious exercise provides a license to harm others, or violate the rights of third parties."

Louise Melling, ACLU deputy legal director, said religious freedom "gives us all the right to hold our beliefs, but it doesn't give you the right to impose your beliefs on others, to discriminate against others." The editorial board of The New York Times wrote that the decision "swept aside accepted principles of corporate law and religious liberty to grant owners of closely held, for-profit companies an unprecedented right to impose their religious views on employees." A Fox News columnist wrote, "..., with all of the debate about the religious beliefs of the Hobby Lobby owners, what about the religious beliefs of their employees? They are just as important, and should not be trampled upon." The director of the United Church of Christ's Washington, D.C. office, said that the ruling "may embolden private employers to claim religious objections to particular health care services, in effect forcing their own religious views upon their employees." Former Secretary of State Hillary Clinton said, "It's the first time that our court has said that a closely held corporation has the rights of a person when it comes to religious freedom, which means that the ... corporation's employers can impose their religious beliefs on their employees." The Center for American Progress said that the ruling "moves in the direction this court has been moving already, which is talking about corporate personhood—really treating corporations like people, saying that the corporation has a religion itself and that should be imposed on its employees." Interfaith Alliance leader Rev. Welton Gaddy said, "The First Amendment is at its best when it is used to protect the rights of minorities from the whims of the powerful. Today's decision, which gives the powerful the right to force their religious beliefs on those around them, is a far cry from the best traditions of religious freedom."

Brett McDonnell, a progressive legal scholar, disagreed, arguing that companies owned and run by liberals will likewise benefit from the freedom to operate according to their conscience or values—which has not been viewed as "imposing" views, because people routinely choose whom to associate with based on philosophical compatibility. Additionally, some argue that "religious freedom is worth more than $35," in reference to the $35 that is saved by coverage of the contraceptives and that the Affordable Care Act would not have passed if it were designed to mandate this coverage.

=== Corporate liability ===
The New York Times editor Dorothy J. Samuels invoked the cautionary adage "be careful what you wish for", speculating that "if owners indicate that they are not entirely separate from their corporation—by denying corporation employees' birth control coverage based on their personal religious beliefs—the case could be made in future state-court litigation that they have waived their right to be shielded from responsibility for corporate financial liabilities." The dean of the UC Irvine School of Law, Erwin Chemerinsky, said, "The liabilities of the corporation are not attributed to the owners, so why should the owners be able to attribute their beliefs to the company?" Several legal scholars wrote an amicus brief to the Supreme Court for this case arguing this danger, while scholars on the other side counter that incorporated non-profit organizations enjoy liability protection despite their activities based on religious or other values/conscience-based causes.

== See also ==
- United States corporate law
- List of United States Supreme Court cases, volume 573
- King v. Burwell
- Zubik v. Burwell
- David Zubik
- National Federation of Independent Business v. Sebelius
- Sherbert Test
- R v Big M Drug Mart Ltd - Supreme Court of Canada ruling on religious liberty of a corporation

== Notes and references ==
Notes:
