= Jeanne Jugan =

French religious sister

Saint Jeanne Jugan LSP
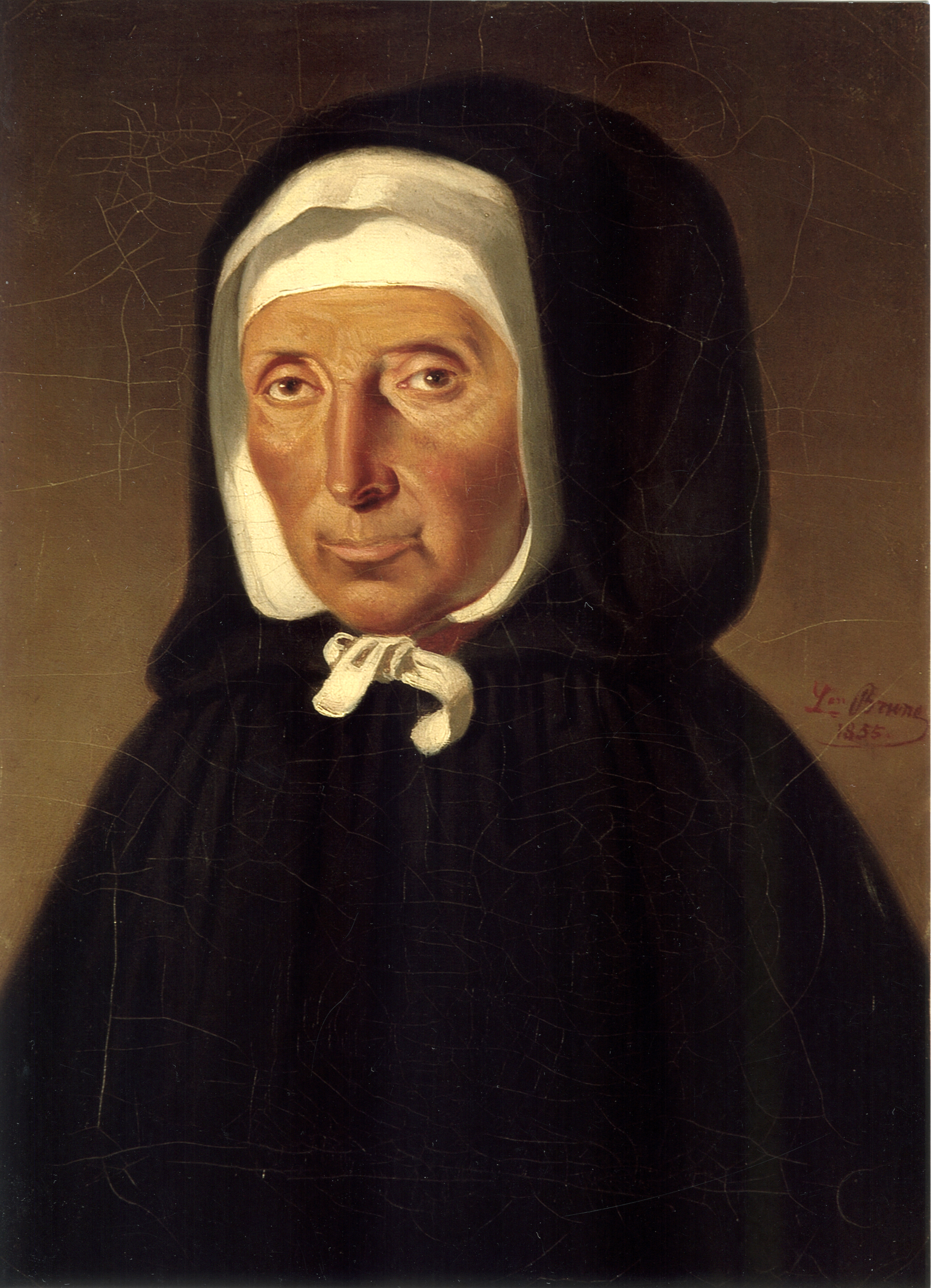
- Portrait of Jugan, c. 1855

Virgin
- Born: 25 October 1792; Cancale, Ille-et-Vilaine, France
- Died: 29 August 1879 (aged 86); Saint-Pern, Ille-et-Vilaine, France
- Venerated in: Roman Catholic Church (Little Sisters of the Poor and the Eudist Fathers)
- Beatified: 3 October 1982, Vatican City, by Pope John Paul II
- Canonized: 11 October 2009, Vatican City, by Pope Benedict XVI
- Major shrine: La Tour Saint-Joseph, Saint-Pern, Ille-et-Vilaine, France
- Feast: 30 August

Jeanne Jugan, LSP (25 October 1792 – 29 August 1879), in religion Mary of the Cross, was a French Catholic religious sister who became known for the dedication of her life to the neediest of the elderly poor. Her service resulted in the establishment of the Little Sisters of the Poor, who care for the elderly throughout the world. She was canonized in 2009.

== Life ==
=== Early life ===
Jugan was born on 25 October 1792, in the port city of Cancale in Brittany, the sixth of the eight children of Joseph and Marie Jugan. She grew up during the political and religious upheavals of the French Revolution. Four years after she was born, her father, a fisherman, was lost at sea. Her mother struggled to provide for the young Jeanne and her siblings, while also providing them secretly with religious instruction amid the anti-Catholic persecutions of the day.

Jugan worked as a shepherdess while still very young, and learned to knit and spin wool. She could barely read and write. When she was 16, she took a job as the kitchen maid of the Viscountess de la Choue. The viscountess, a devout Catholic, had Jugan accompany her when she visited the sick and the poor.

At age 18, and again six years later, she declined marriage proposals from the same man. She told her mother that God had other plans, and was calling her to "a work which is not yet founded". At age 25, the young woman became an Associate of the Congregation of Jesus and Mary founded by John Eudes (Eudists). Jugan also worked as a nurse in the town hospital of Saint-Servan for six years, until she left the hospital due to her own health issues. She then worked for 12 years as the servant of a fellow member of the Eudist Third Order, until the woman's death in 1835. In the course of Jugan's duties, the two women recognized a similar Catholic spirituality and began to teach catechism to the children of the town and to care for the poor and other unfortunates.

In 1837, Jugan and a 72-year-old woman (Françoise Aubert) rented part of a small cottage and were joined by Virginie Tredaniel, a 17-year-old orphan. These three women then formed a Catholic community of prayer, devoted to teaching the catechism and assisting the poor.

=== Foundress ===
In the winter of 1839, Jugan encountered Anne Chauvin, an elderly woman who was blind, partially paralyzed, and had no one to care for her. Jugan carried her home to her apartment and took her in from that day forward, letting the woman have her bed while she slept in the attic. She soon took in two more old women in need of help, and by 1841 she had rented a room to provide housing for a dozen elderly people. The following year, she acquired an unused convent building that could house 40 of them.

From this act of charity, with the approval of her colleagues, Jeanne then focused her attention upon the mission of assisting abandoned elderly women, and from this beginning arose a religious congregation called The Little Sisters of the Poor. Jugan wrote a simple Rule of Life for this new community of women, and they went door-to-door daily requesting food, clothing and money for the women in their care. This became Jugan's life work.

During the 1840s, many other young women joined Jugan in her mission of service to the elderly poor. By begging in the streets, the foundress was able to establish four more homes for their beneficiaries by the end of the decade.

In 1847, based on the request of Leo Dupont (known as the Holy Man of Tours) she established a house in that city. She was much sought after whenever problems arose and worked with religious and civil authorities to seek help for the poor.

By 1850, over 100 women had joined the congregation. Jugan, however, was forced out of her leadership role by the Abbé Auguste Le Pailleur, the priest who had been appointed Superior General of the congregation by the local bishop. In an apparent effort to suppress her true role as foundress, he assigned her to do nothing but begging on the street until she was sent into retirement and a life of obscurity for 27 years. Her eyesight was impaired in her final years.

=== Expansion ===
After communities of Little Sisters had begun to spread throughout France, the work expanded to England in 1851. From 1866 to 1871 five communities of Little Sisters were founded across the United States. By 1879, the community Jeanne founded had 2,400 Little Sisters and had spread across Europe and to North America. On 1 March that same year, Pope Leo XIII approved the Constitutions for the Little Sisters of the Poor for an initial period of seven years. At the time of her death on 29 August 1879, at the age of 86, many of the Little Sisters did not know that she was the one to have founded the congregation. Le Pailleur, however, was investigated and dismissed in 1890, and Jugan came to be acknowledged as their foundress.

In September 1885, the congregation arrived in South America and made a first foundation in Valparaíso, Chile, from which it expanded later on.

== Veneration ==
Jugan died in 1879, aged 86, and was buried in the graveyard of the General Motherhouse at Saint-Pern. She was beatified in Rome by Pope John Paul II on 3 October 1982, and canonized on 11 October 2009, by Pope Benedict XVI, who said, "In the Beatitudes, Jeanne Jugan found the source of the spirit of hospitality and fraternal love, founded on unlimited trust in Providence, which illuminated her whole life."

Today, pilgrims can visit the house where she was born, the House of the Cross at Saint-Servan and the motherhouse where she lived her last 23 years at La Tour Saint Joseph in Saint-Pern.

== Legacy ==
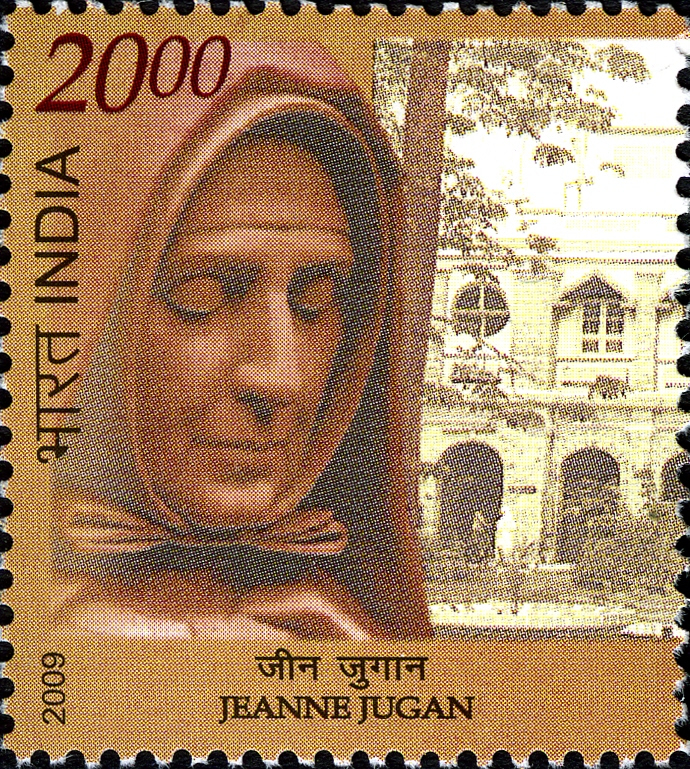
An Indian stamp of Jugan

The Sisters at the Queen of Peace Residence in Queens Village, New York established the Jeanne Jugan Award which is presented to the staff member who best exemplifies Jugan's spirit.

== See also ==
- Mary Angeline Teresa McCrory: Carmelite Sisters for the Aged and Infirm
- Teresa Jornet Ibars: Little Sisters of the Abandoned Elderly

== Sources ==
- Paul Milcen, 2000 Jeanne Jugan: Humble, So as to Love More Darton, Longman & Todd ISBN 0-232-52383-5
