= Little Sisters of the Poor =

Catholic religious institute for women

- Petites Sœurs des pauvres
- Abbreviation: LSP; PSDP
- Formation: 1839; 187 years ago
- Founder: Saint Jeanne Jugan
- Type: Religious institute of the Catholic Church
- Purpose: Care for the elderly poor
- Headquarters: 3 La Tour St Joseph, 35190 Saint-Pern, France
- Coordinates: 48.29361400838414°N 1.9921482741332976°W
- Region served: 31 countries on five continents
- Members: 2,372 sisters
- Website: littlesistersofthepoor.org

The Little Sisters of the Poor (French: Petites Sœurs des pauvres) is a Catholic religious institute for women founded by Jeanne Jugan. Having felt the need to care for the many impoverished elderly who lined the streets of French towns and cities, Jugan established the congregation in 1839.

== History ==
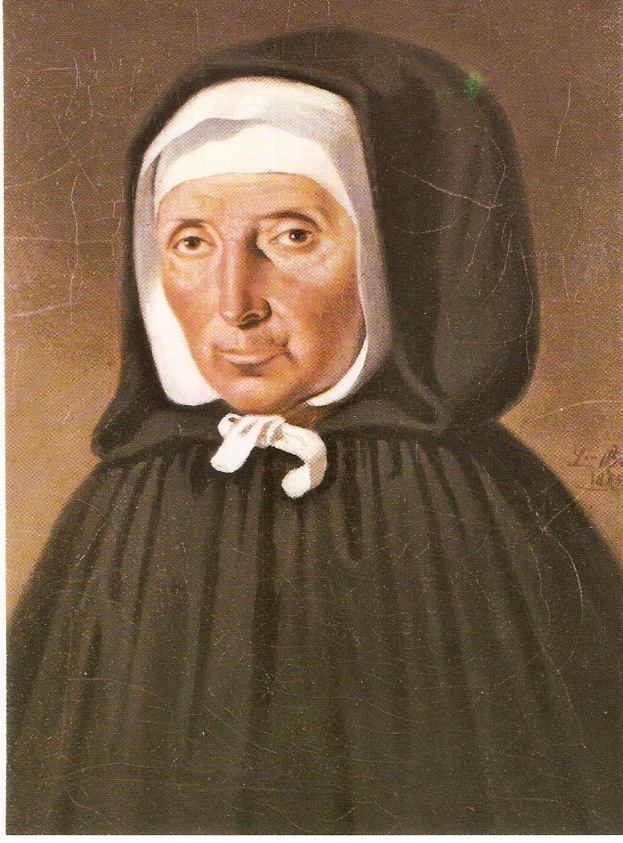
Saint Jeanne Jugan, foundress of the order.

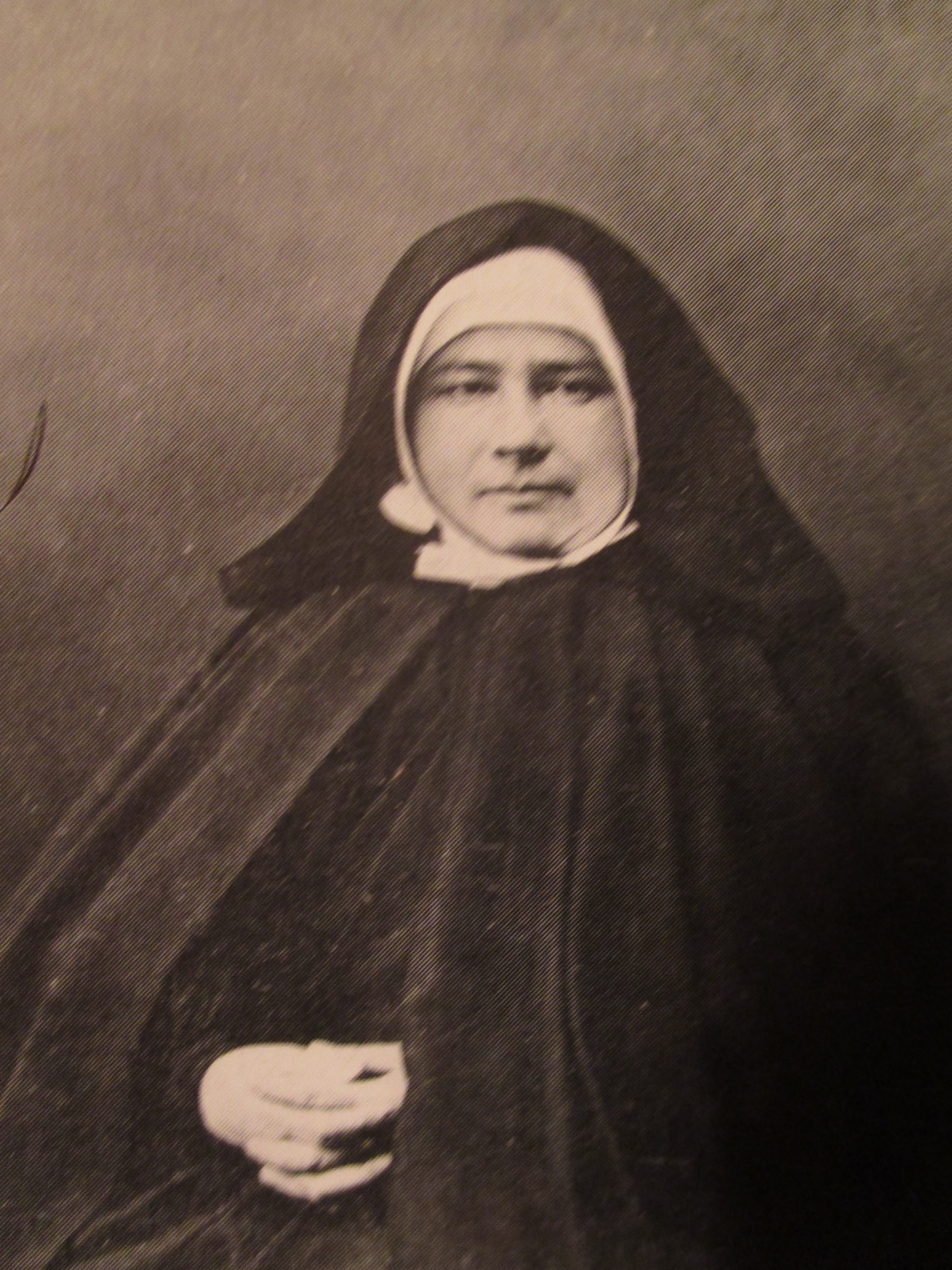
Marie Jamet, Mother Superior for nearly fifty years after Jugan.

The Congregation of the Little Sisters of the Poor was founded in Cancale in Brittany in 1839. In 1847, a house was established in Tours, and communities of sisters began to spread across France. In 1851, the work expanded to England, and in 1868, the Little Sisters also extended to the United States, where (as of 2014) they now operate twenty-nine homes to care for the elderly poor.

Pope Benedict XVI canonized their foundress, Jeanne Jugan, on 11 October 2009.

== Present day ==
The motherhouse is in Saint-Pern, France.

Internationally, the letters following members' names are PSDP. In the United States, however, they are LSP. Today the Little Sisters of the Poor serve over 13,000 of the elderly poor in 31 countries around the world (including homes in the United States, Turkey, Hong Kong, Taiwan, India, Penang, New Zealand, South Korea, and Philippines), continuing their original purpose of caring for the elderly. As of January 1, 2014, they were one of the larger religious institutes of women in the Catholic Church, with 234 houses and 2,372 members.

Members, in accordance with the evangelical counsels, make vows of chastity, poverty, and obedience, but also a fourth, hospitality. They believe hospitality perfects the other three by bringing their religious consecration into the realities of everyday life and giving a spiritual dimension to the many humble tasks of hospitality performed throughout the day. They wear traditional habits, either all-white or black with gray veils.

The Sisters continue the tradition of begging, which was set forth by their founder, Jugan. To provide for the needs of the aged poor, she traveled the roads of France on foot seeking alms. She was recognized by the begging basket she carried. Knocking on doors, she asked for not only money but also for gifts that were needed, such as food, clothing, wood, and wool.

== Little Sisters of the Poor v. Pennsylvania ==
The Patient Protection and Affordable Care Act tried to require employers to offer health-insurance plans that paid for contraceptives. The law specifically exempted churches, but not faith-based ministries. Consequently, religious nonprofit organizations, such as Little Sisters of the Poor, were fined if they did not comply with the law.

On 6 October 2017, the U.S. Department of Health and Human Services issued a new rule with an updated religious exemption that protected religious nonprofit organizations. Federal Judge Wendy Beetlestone issued an injunction, temporarily preventing the enforcement of that exemption. The Commonwealth of Pennsylvania also sued the federal government to take away the exemption. Pennsylvania asked a judge to order that the Little Sisters of the Poor must comply with the federal mandate or pay a penalty of tens of millions of dollars. The state alleged that the religious organization violated the Constitution, federal anti-discrimination law, and the Administrative Procedure Act (APA).

On 8 July 2020, in Little Sisters of the Poor Saints Peter and Paul Home v. Pennsylvania, the U.S. Supreme Court decided that the U.S. Department of Health and Human Services had the authority under the Affordable Care Act to allow the religious and moral exemptions, and that the rules for the exemptions are free from procedural defects, meaning that the Little Sisters of the Poor need not provide contraception nor abortion coverage in their employees' health plans.

== See also ==
- Zubik v. Burwell — a case before the U.S. Supreme Court on the contraceptive mandate, involving the Little Sisters of the Poor
