= Walmart =

American multinational retail corporation

Walmart Inc.
- "Spark" symbol used since 2025

- Wordmark used since 2025
- Formerly: Wal-Mart Discount City (1962–1969); Wal-Mart, Inc. (1969–1970); Wal-Mart Stores, Inc. (1970–2018)
- Type: Public
- Traded as: Nasdaq: WMT; Nasdaq-100 component; DJIA component; S&P 100 component; S&P 500 component
- ISIN: US9311421039
- Industry: Retail
- Predecessor: Walton's Five and Dime
- Founded: July 2, 1962; 64 years ago, in Rogers, Arkansas, U.S.
- Founders: Sam Walton; Bud Walton
- Headquarters: Bentonville, Arkansas, United States; 36°21′56″N 94°13′03″W
- Number of locations: 10,373 stores 601 warehouse clubs
- Area served: Worldwide
- Key people: Greg Penner (chairman); John Furner (president, CEO)
- Services: Walmart+; Walmart-2-Walmart
- Revenue: ▲US$713.20 billion (2025)
- Operating income: ▲US$29.348 billion (2025)
- Net income: ▲US$19.436 billion (2025)
- Total assets: ▲US$260.82 billion (2025)
- Total equity: ▲US$97.421 billion (2025)
- Owner: Walton family (44.8%; mainly via Walton Enterprises)
- Number of employees: 2,100,000 (2025) (Note: Walmart directly employs 1.6 million in the United States and about 500,000 across 19 countries globally.)
- Divisions: Walmart U.S.; Walmart International; Sam's Club; Global eCommerce
- Subsidiaries: List of subsidiaries
- Website: walmart.com
- Footnotes; Financials as of January 31, 2025. References

Walmart Inc. (Note: /ˈwɔːlmɑːrt/) is an American multinational omnichannel retail corporation (Note: See List of largest retail companies.) that operates a chain of hypermarkets (also called supercenters), discount department stores, grocery stores, pharmacies, (Note: Walmart owns and operates approximately 4,700 pharmacies across the United States. They are embedded within Walmart Supercenters, Discount Stores, and Neighborhood Markets.) and gas stations (Note: Walmart operates 400+ Walmart-branded fuel and convenience stations in the United States, and plans to expand to 450+ locations across 34 states.) in the United States and 19 other countries. It is headquartered in Bentonville, Arkansas. The company was founded in 1962 by brothers Sam Walton and James "Bud" Walton in nearby Rogers, Arkansas. It also owns and operates Sam's Club retail warehouses.

As of 2026, Walmart is the second-largest company by revenue globally (Note: Walmart has held the top spot on the Fortune Global 500 list as the world's largest company by revenue exactly 20 times. This total includes a dominant 12-year consecutive streak from 2014 through 2025.) and the largest private employer in the world, (Note: Refer List of largest employers.) with 2.1 million employees. The company is ranked two in the Fortune 500 and Fortune Global 500. In February 2026, Walmart became the first traditional retailer to be valued at over $1 trillion and is known for product innovation. It is a publicly traded family-owned business (the largest such business in the world), as the company is controlled by the Walton family. Sam Walton's heirs own over 50 percent of Walmart through both their holding company Walton Enterprises and their individual holdings.

Walmart was listed on the New York Stock Exchange in 1972 and switched to the Nasdaq in December 2025. It is a core member of major indices, including Dow Jones Global Titans 50 and S&P 500. By 1988, it was the most profitable retailer in the U.S., and it had become the largest in terms of revenue by October 1989. The company was originally geographically limited to the South and lower Midwest, but it had stores from coast to coast by the early 1990s. As of early 2026, Walmart holds a global portfolio of 8,841 total patent filings, of which approximately 2,686 have been successfully granted. It is one of the most valuable public companies, and one of the most valuable brands globally.

== History ==
=== 1945–1969: Early history ===
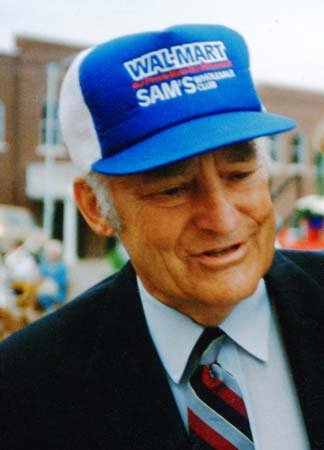
Founder Sam Walton

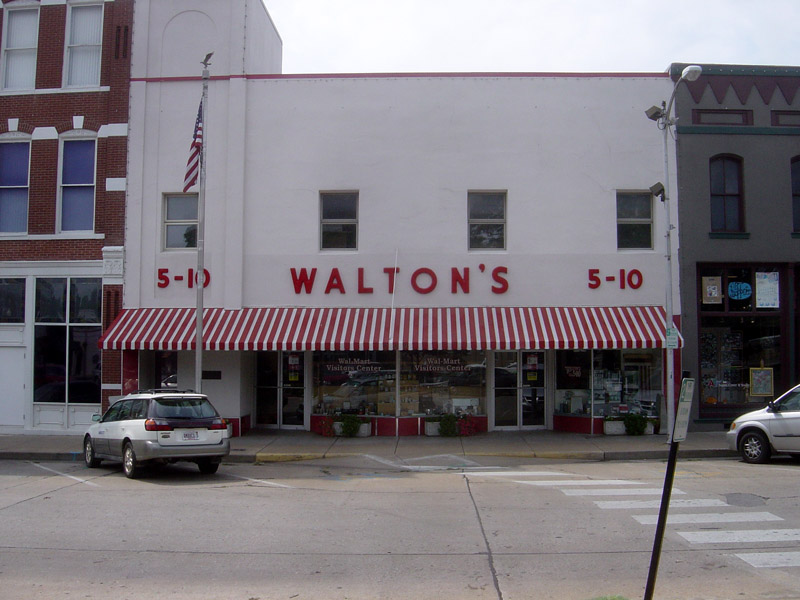
Sam Walton's original Walton's Five and Dime Store in Bentonville, Arkansas, now serving as The Walmart Museum

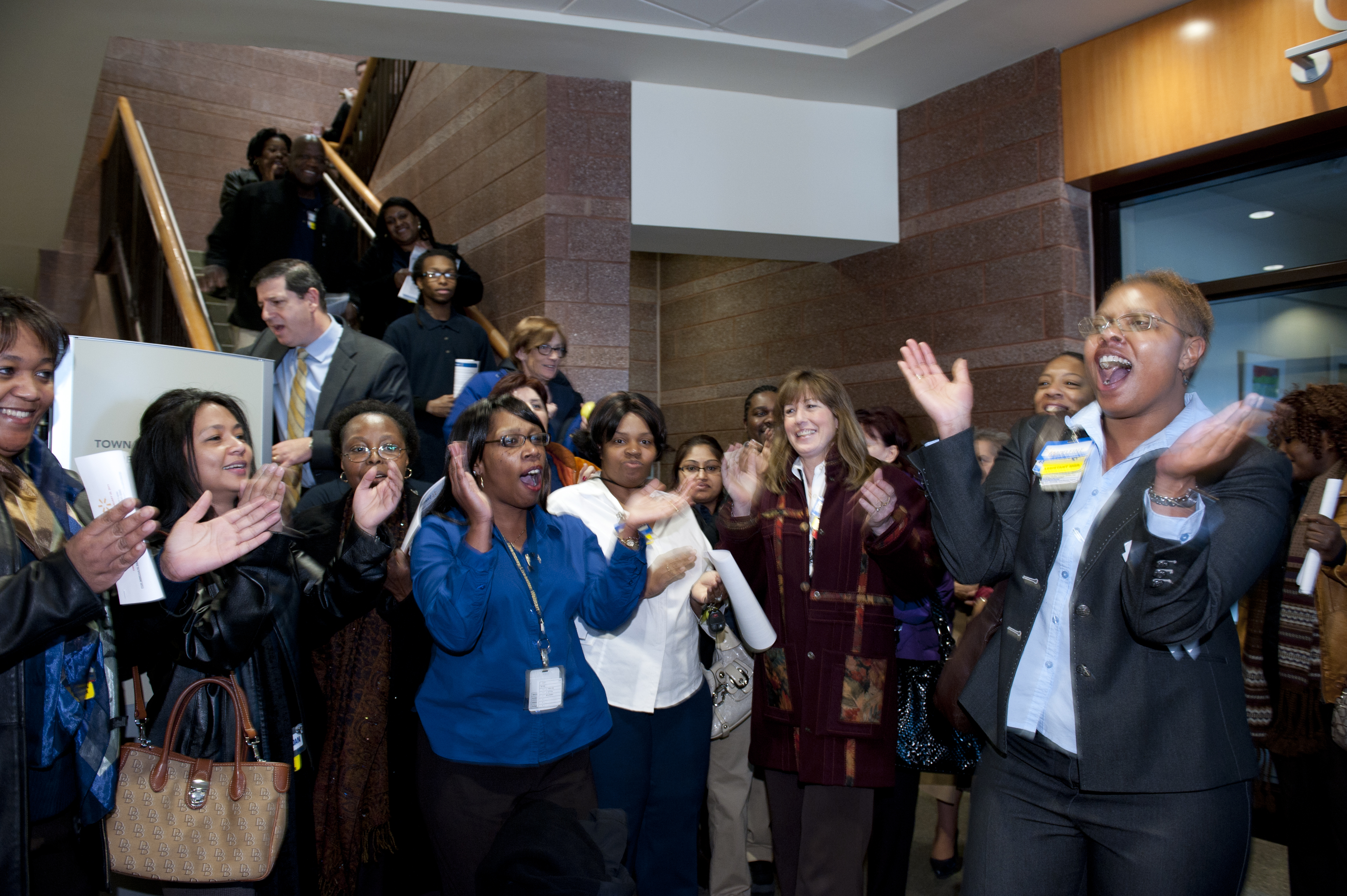
The Walmart Cheer is a daily, energetic team-building ritual created by founder Sam Walton in 1975.

In 1945, businessman and former J. C. Penney employee Sam Walton bought a Ben Franklin store branch from the Butler Brothers. His primary focus was selling products at low prices to get higher-volume sales at a lower profit margin, portraying it as a crusade for the consumer. He experienced setbacks because the lease price and branch purchase were unusually high, but he was able to find lower-cost suppliers than those used by other stores and was consequently able to undercut his competitors on pricing. Sales increased 45% in his first year of ownership to US$105,000 in revenue, which increased to $140,000 the next year and $175,000 the year after that. Within the fifth year, the store was generating $250,000 in revenue. The lease then expired for the location and Walton was unable to reach an agreement for renewal, so he opened up a new store at 105 N. Main Street in Bentonville, naming it "Walton's Five and Dime". That store is now the Walmart Museum.

Logo used from 1962 to 1975

On July 2, 1962, Walton opened the first Wal-Mart Discount City store at 719 W. Walnut Street in Rogers, Arkansas. Its design was inspired by Ann & Hope, which Walton visited in 1961, as did Kmart founder Harry B. Cunningham. The name was derived from FedMart, a chain of discount department stores founded by Sol Price in 1954, whom Walton was also inspired by. Walton stated that he liked the idea of calling his discount chain "Wal-Mart" because he "really liked Sol's FedMart name". The building is now occupied by a hardware store and an antiques mall, while the company's "Store #1" has since expanded to a Supercenter several blocks west at 2110 W. Walnut Street. Within its first five years, the company expanded to 18 stores in Arkansas and reached $9 million in sales. In 1968, it opened its first stores outside Arkansas in Sikeston, Missouri and Claremore, Oklahoma.

=== 1969–1990: Incorporation and growth as a regional power ===
Logo used from 1975 to 1981

The company was incorporated under Delaware General Corporation Law as Wal-Mart, Inc. on October 31, 1969, and changed its name to Wal-Mart Stores, Inc. in 1970. The same year, the company opened a home office and first distribution center in Bentonville, Arkansas. It had 38 stores operating with 1,500 employees and sales of $44.2 million. It began trading stock as a publicly held company on October 1, 1970, and was soon listed on the New York Stock Exchange. The first stock split occurred in May 1971 for $47 per share. By this time, Wal-Mart was operating in five states: Arkansas, Kansas, Louisiana, Missouri, and Oklahoma; it entered Tennessee in 1973 and Kentucky and Mississippi in 1974. As the company moved into Texas in 1975, there were 125 stores with 7,500 employees and total sales of $340.3 million.

Logo used from 1981 to 1992

In the 1980s, Wal-Mart briefly experimented with a precursor to the Supercenter, the Hyper-Mart. Four stores combined features of discount stores, supermarkets, pharmacies, video arcades, and other amenities. Wal-Mart continued to grow rapidly, and by the company's 25th anniversary in 1987, there were 1,198 Wal-Mart stores with sales of $15.9 billion and 200,000 associates. One reason for Wal-Mart's success between 1980 and 2000 is believed to be its contiguous pattern of expansion over time, building new distribution centers in a hub and spoke framework within driving distance of existing Supercenters.

The company's satellite network was also completed in 1987, a $24 million investment linking all stores with two-way voice and data transmissions and one-way video communications with the Bentonville office. At the time, the company was the largest private satellite network, allowing the corporate office to track inventory and sales and to instantly communicate with stores. By 1984, Sam Walton had begun to source between 6% and 40% of his company's products from China. In 1988, Walton stepped down as CEO and was replaced by David Glass. Walton remained as chairman of the board. During this year, the first Wal-Mart Supercenter opened in Washington, Missouri.

With the contribution of its superstores, the company surpassed Toys "R" Us in toy sales in 1998.

=== 1990–2005: Retail rise to multinational status ===
Logo used from 1992 to 2007

While it was the third-largest retailer in the United States, Wal-Mart was more profitable than rivals Kmart and Sears by the late 1980s. By 1990, it became the largest U.S. retailer by revenue.

Prior to the summer of 1990, Wal-Mart had no presence on the West Coast or in the Northeast, apart from a Sam's Club location in New Jersey which opened in November 1989; however, in July and October that year, it opened its first stores in California and Pennsylvania, respectively. By the mid-1990s, it was the most powerful retailer in the U.S. and expanded into Mexico in 1991 and Canada in 1994. Wal-Mart stores opened throughout the rest of the U.S., with Vermont being the last state to get a store in 1995.

The company also opened stores outside North America, entering South America in 1995 with stores in Argentina and Brazil; and Europe in July 1999, buying Asda in the United Kingdom for US$10 billion.

In 1997, Wal-Mart was added to the Dow Jones Industrial Average.

The 1992 logo was recolored to a lighter shade of blue in 2007 in preparation of the logo that would be introduced the following year

Logo used from 2008 to 2025

In 1998, Wal-Mart introduced the Neighborhood Market concept with three stores in Arkansas. By 2005, estimates indicate that the company controlled about 20% of the retail grocery and consumables business.

Logo used since 2025

In 2000, H. Lee Scott became Wal-Mart's president and CEO as the company's sales increased to $165 billion. In 2002, it was listed for the first time as America's largest corporation on the Fortune 500 list, with revenues of $219.8 billion and profits of $6.7 billion. It has remained there every year except 2006, 2009, and 2012.

In 2005, Wal-Mart reported US$312.4 billion in sales, more than 6,200 facilities around the world—including 3,800 stores in the United States and 2,800 elsewhere, employing more than 1.6 million associates. Its U.S. presence grew so rapidly that only small pockets of the country remained more than 60 miles (97 kilometers) from the nearest store.

As Wal-Mart expanded rapidly into the world's largest corporation, many critics worried about its effect on local communities, particularly small towns with many "mom and pop" stores. There have been several studies on the economic impact of Wal-Mart on small towns and local businesses, jobs, and taxpayers. Kenneth Stone, a professor of economics, found that some small towns can lose almost half of their retail trade within ten years of a Wal-Mart store opening. However, in another study, he compared the changes to what small-town shops had faced in the past—including the development of the railroads, the advent of the Sears Roebuck catalog, and the arrival of shopping malls—and concluded that shop owners who adapt to changes in the retail market can thrive after Wal-Mart arrives. A later study in collaboration with Mississippi State University showed that there are "both positive and negative impacts on existing stores in the area where the new supercenter locates".

In the aftermath of Hurricane Katrina in September 2005, Wal-Mart used its logistics network to organize a rapid response to the disaster, donating $20 million, 1,500 truckloads of merchandise, food for 100,000 meals, and the promise of a job for every one of its displaced workers. An independent study by Steven Horwitz of St. Lawrence University found that Wal-Mart, The Home Depot, and Lowe's made use of their local knowledge about supply chains, infrastructure, decision makers and other resources to provide emergency supplies and reopen stores well before the Federal Emergency Management Agency (FEMA) began its response. While the company was overall lauded for its quick response amidst criticism of FEMA, several critics were quick to point out that there still remained issues with the company's labor relations.

In 2006, Charles Fishman published The Wal-Mart Effect, examining the operation of Wal-Mart's supply chain. His book caught the attention of the press and the public. Fishman's case studies illustrate Wal-Mart's drive to lower costs and achieve greater efficiency and suggest that it may have significant upstream effects. Since Fishman's book was published, Wal-Mart has more than doubled in size. Further research on Wal-Mart's role in the food supply chain has tended to be limited and anecdotal.

=== 2005–2010: Initiatives ===
==== Environmental initiatives ====
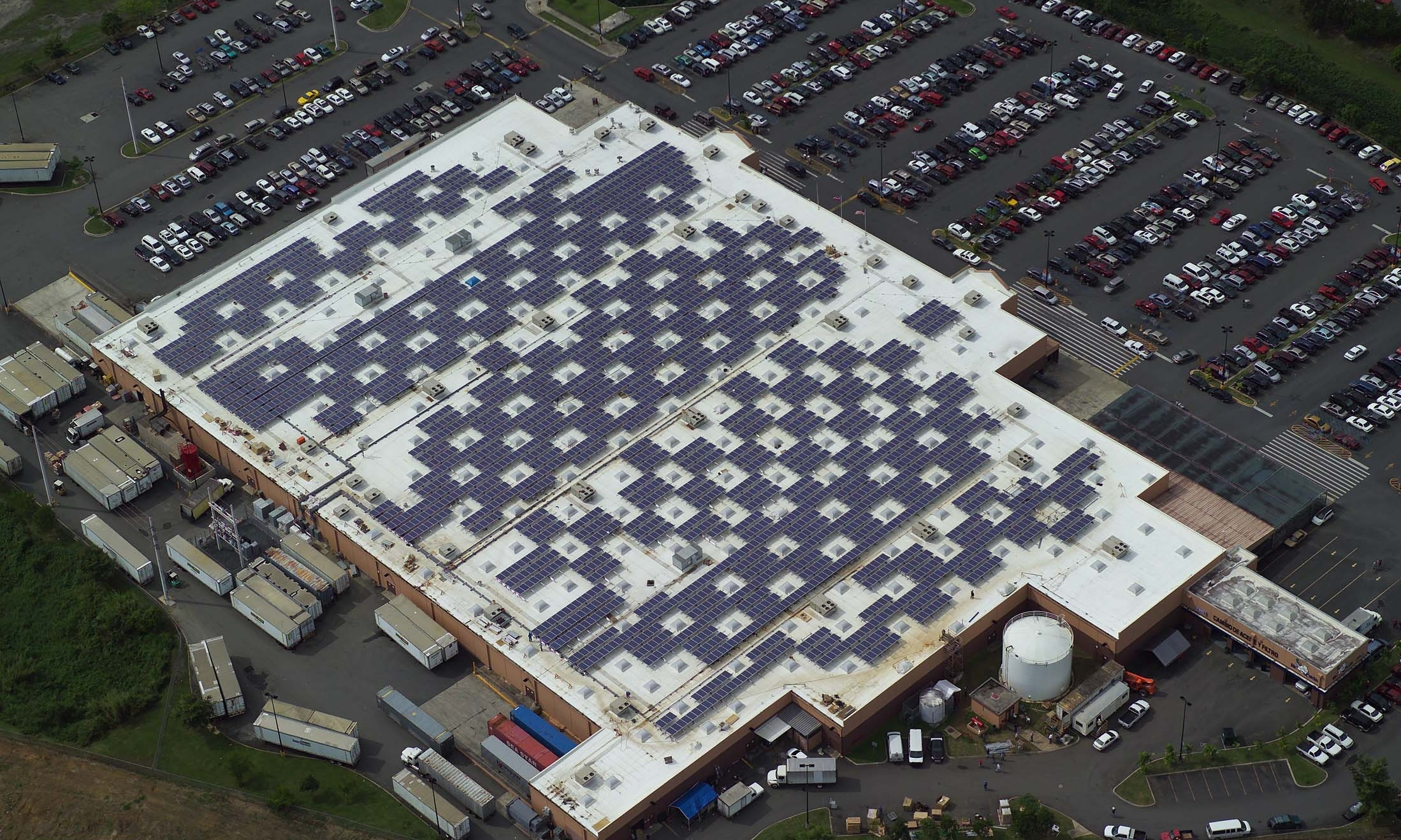
Solar modules mounted on a Walmart Supercenter in Caguas, Puerto Rico (Store #2449)

In November 2005, Wal-Mart announced several environmental measures to increase energy efficiency and improve its overall environmental record, which had previously been lacking. The company's primary goals included spending $500 million a year to increase fuel efficiency in Wal-Mart's truck fleet by 25% over three years and double it within ten; reduce greenhouse gas emissions by 20% in seven years; reduce energy use at stores by 30%; and cut solid waste from U.S. stores and Sam's Clubs by 25% in three years. CEO Lee Scott said that Wal-Mart's goal was to be a "good steward of the environment" and ultimately use only renewable energy sources and produce zero waste. The company also designed three new experimental stores with wind turbines, photovoltaic solar panels, biofuel-capable boilers, water-cooled refrigerators, and xeriscape gardens. In this time, Wal-Mart also became the biggest seller of organic milk and the biggest buyer of organic cotton in the world, while reducing packaging and energy costs. In 2007, the company worked with outside consultants to discover its total environmental impact and find areas for improvement. Wal-Mart created its own electric company in Texas, named Texas Retail Energy, which planned to supply its stores with cheap power purchased at wholesale prices. Through this new venture, the company expected to save $15 million annually and also to lay the groundwork and infrastructure to sell electricity to Texas consumers in the future.

==== Branding and store design changes ====
In 2006, Wal-Mart announced that it would remodel its U.S. stores to help it appeal to a wider variety of demographics, including more affluent shoppers. As part of the initiative, the company launched a new store in Plano, Texas, that included high-end electronics, jewelry, expensive wines and a sushi bar.

Walmart slogan "Save money. Live better." (2007 variant)

Walmart slogan "Save money. Live better." (2025 variant)

On September 12, 2007, Wal-Mart introduced new advertising with the slogan, "Save money. Live better.", replacing the previous slogan "Always Low Prices, Always", which it had used since 1988. Global Insight, which conducted the research that supported the ads, found that Wal-Mart's price level reduction resulted in savings for consumers of $287 billion in 2006, which equated to $957 per person or $2,500 per household (up 7.3% from the 2004 savings estimate of $2,329).

On June 30, 2008, Wal-Mart removed the hyphen from its logo and replaced the star with a Spark symbol. The store branding became "Walmart", with the corporate name remaining with the hyphen as "Wal-Mart". Design critics gave the new logo mixed reviews, questioning if it was as bold as competitors like Target's bullseye, or as iconic as the previous 18-year-old design. The new logo, designed by Lippincott, made its debut on the company's website on July 1, 2008, and its U.S. locations updated store logos in the fall of 2008. Walmart Canada started to adopt the logo for its stores in early 2009.

==== Acquisitions and employee benefits ====
On March 20, 2009, Walmart announced that it was paying a combined US$933.6 million in bonuses to every full and part-time hourly worker. This was in addition to $788.8 million in profit sharing, 401(k) pension contributions, hundreds of millions of dollars in merchandise discounts, and contributions to the employees' stock purchase plan. While the economy at large was in an ongoing recession, Walmart reported solid financial figures for the fiscal year ending January 31, 2009, with $401.2 billion in net sales, a gain of 7.2% from the prior year. Income from continuing operations increased 3% to $13.3 billion, and earnings per share rose 6% to $3.35.

On February 22, 2010, the company confirmed it was acquiring video streaming company Vudu, Inc. for an estimated $100 million.

=== 2011–2019 ===
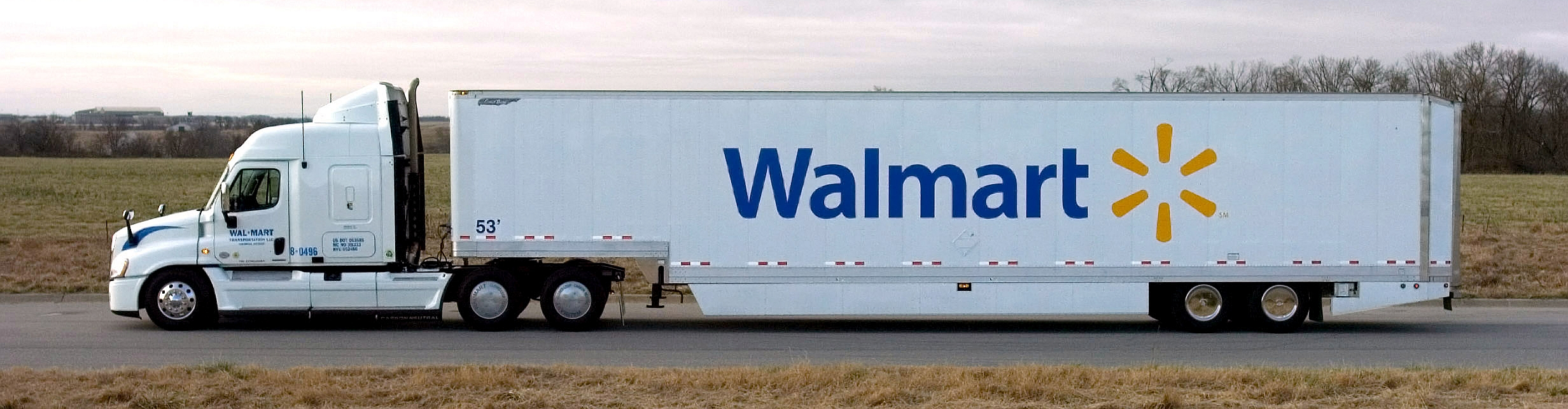
A truck converted to run on biofuel

Walmart's truck fleet logs millions of miles each year, and the company planned to double the fleet's efficiency between 2005 and 2015. Fifteen based at Walmart's Buckeye, Arizona, distribution center were converted to run on biofuel from reclaimed cooking grease made during food preparation at Walmart stores.

On November 14, 2012, Walmart launched its first mail subscription service called Goodies. Customers pay a $7 monthly subscription for five to eight delivered food samples each month. The service shut down in late 2013.

In August 2013, the firm announced it was in talks to acquire a majority stake in the Kenya-based supermarket chain, Naivas.

On November 25, 2013, Walmart announced that Doug McMillon, CEO of Walmart International, would replace Mike Duke as Walmart CEO effective on February 1, 2014, becoming the company's fifth chief executive.

In June 2014, some Walmart employees went on strike in major U.S. cities demanding higher wages. In July 2014, American actor and comedian Tracy Morgan launched a lawsuit against Walmart seeking punitive damages over a multi-car pile-up which the suit alleges was caused by the driver of one of the firm's tractor-trailers who had not slept for 24 hours. Morgan's limousine was apparently hit by the trailer, injuring him and two fellow passengers and killing a fourth, fellow comedian James McNair. Walmart settled with the McNair family for $10 million, while admitting no liability. Morgan and Walmart reached a settlement in 2015 for an undisclosed amount, though Walmart later accused its insurers of "bad faith" in refusing to pay the settlement.

In 2015, Walmart was the biggest U.S. commercial producer of solar power with 142 MW capacity, and had 17 energy storage projects. This solar was primarily on rooftops, whereas there is an additional 20,000 m^{2} for solar canopies over parking lots.

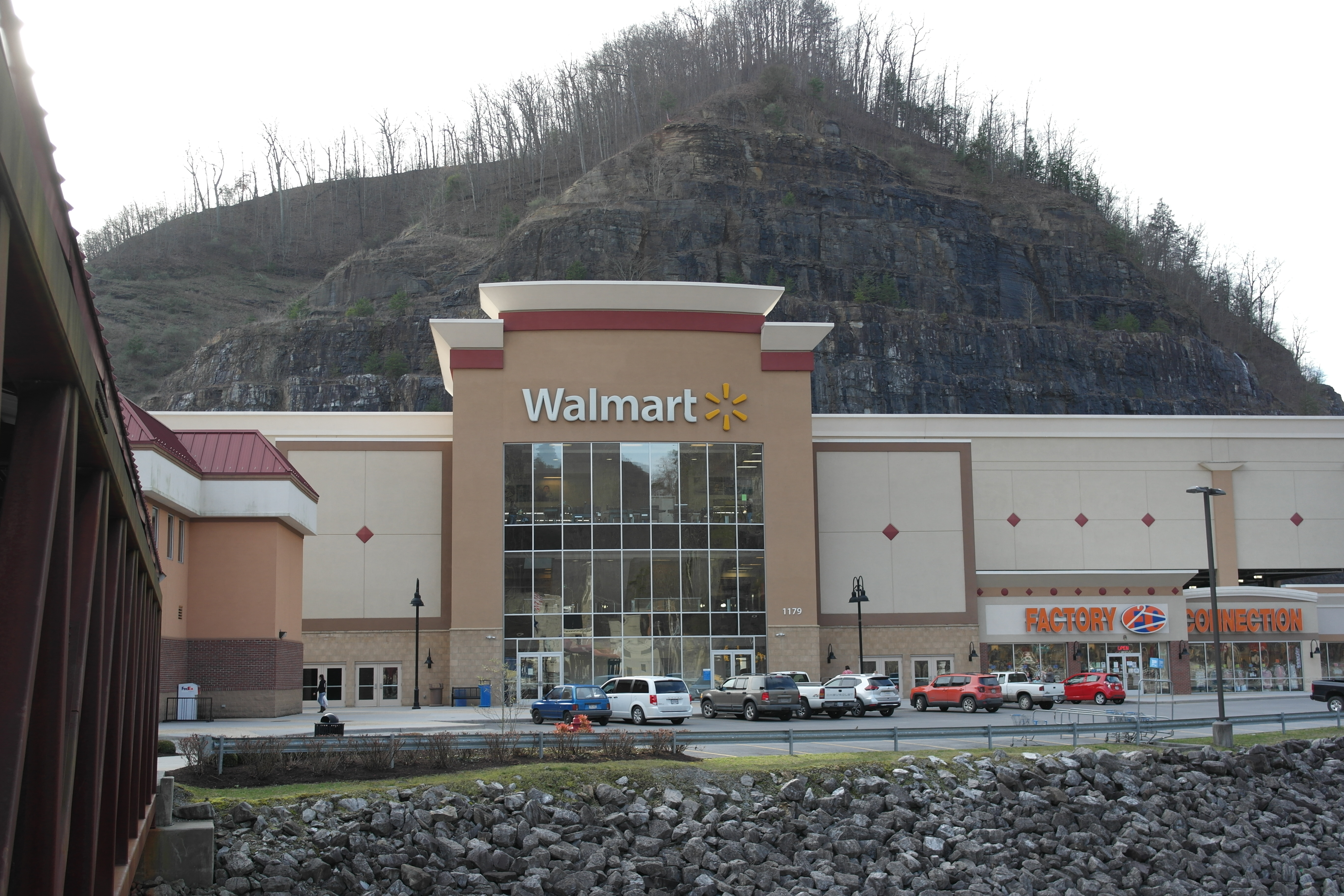
Walmart Supercenter in Grundy, Virginia (Store #3303). This store was built as part of a $200 million revitalization project. The store was built on top of a two-story parking garage, the only one of its kind in the United States.

On January 15, 2016, Walmart announced it would close 269 stores in 2016, affecting 16,000 workers. Of the stores earmarked for closure, 154 were in the U.S., 95% of which were located, on average, 10 miles from another Walmart store. The 269 stores represented less than 1 percent of global square footage and revenue for the company. The 102 locations of Neighborhood Markets that were formerly or originally planned to be Walmart Express, which had been in a pilot program since 2011 and converted in to Neighborhood Markets in 2014, were included in the closures. Walmart planned to focus on "strengthening Supercenters, optimizing Neighborhood Markets, growing the e-commerce business and expanding pickup services for customers". In fiscal 2017, the company plans to open between 50 and 60 Supercenters, 85 to 95 Neighborhood Markets, 7 to 10 Sam's Clubs, and 200 to 240 international locations. At the end of fiscal 2017, Walmart opened 38 Supercenters and relocated, expanded or converted 21 discount stores into Supercenters, for a total of 59 Supercenters, and opened 69 Neighborhood Markets, 8 Sam's Clubs, and 173 international locations, and relocated, expanded or converted 4 locations for a total of 177 international locations. On August 8, 2016, Walmart announced a deal to acquire e-commerce website Jet.com for US$3.3 billion. Jet.com co-founder and CEO Marc Lore stayed on to run Jet.com in addition to Walmart's existing U.S. e-commerce operation. The acquisition was structured as a payout of $3 billion in cash, and an additional $300 million in Walmart stock vested over time as part of an incentive bonus plan for Jet.com executives. On October 19, 2016, Walmart announced it would partner with IBM and Tsinghua University to track the pork supply chain in China using blockchain. The use of blockchain to automate the tracking of the supply chain promises the potential for Walmart to save money and thus increase profits.

On February 15, 2017, Walmart announced the acquisition of Moosejaw, a leading online active outdoor retailer, for approximately $51 million. The acquisition closed on February 13, 2017. On June 16, 2017, Walmart agreed to acquire the men's apparel company Bonobos for $310 million in an effort to expand its fashion holdings. On September 29, 2017, Walmart acquired Parcel, a same-day and last-mile delivery company in Brooklyn. In 2018, Walmart started crowdsourcing delivery services to customers using drivers' private vehicles, under the brand "Spark".

On December 6, 2017, Walmart announced that it would change its corporate name to Walmart Inc. from Wal-Mart Stores, Inc. effective February 1, 2018.

On January 11, 2018, Walmart announced that 63 Sam's Club locations would be closing. Some of the stores had already liquidated, without notifying employees; some employees learned by a company-wide email delivered January 11. Walmart said that ten of the stores will become e-commerce distribution centers and employees can reapply to work at those locations. Business Insider magazine calculated that over 11,000 workers would be affected. On the same day, Walmart announced that as a result of the new tax law, it would be raising Walmart starting wages, distributing bonuses, expanding its leave policies and contributing toward the cost of employees' adoptions. Doug McMillon, Walmart's CEO, said, "We are early in the stages of assessing the opportunities tax reform creates for us to invest in our customers and associates and to further strengthen our business, all of which should benefit our shareholders."

It was reported that Walmart is now looking at entering the subscription-video space, hoping to compete with Netflix and Amazon. They have enlisted the help of former Epix CEO, Mark Greenberg, to help develop a low-cost subscription video-streaming service.

On February 26, 2019, Walmart announced that it had acquired Tel Aviv-based product review start-up Aspectiva for an undisclosed sum.

In May 2019, Walmart announced the launch of free one-day shipping on more than 220,000 items with minimum purchase amount of $35.

In September 2019, Walmart announced that it would cease the sale of all e-cigarettes due to "regulatory complexity and uncertainty" over the products. Earlier in 2019, Walmart stopped selling fruit-flavored e-cigarette and had raised the minimum age to 21 for the purchase of products containing tobacco. That same month, Walmart opened its first Health Center, a "medical mall" where customers can purchase primary care services. Prices without insurance were listed, for instance, at $30 for an annual physical and $45 for a counseling session. Continuing with its health care initiative, a 6,200 square feet health and wellness clinic prototype opened in Springdale, Arkansas to expand services.

By October 2019, Walmart stopped selling all live fish and aquatic plants.

=== 2020s: Development ===
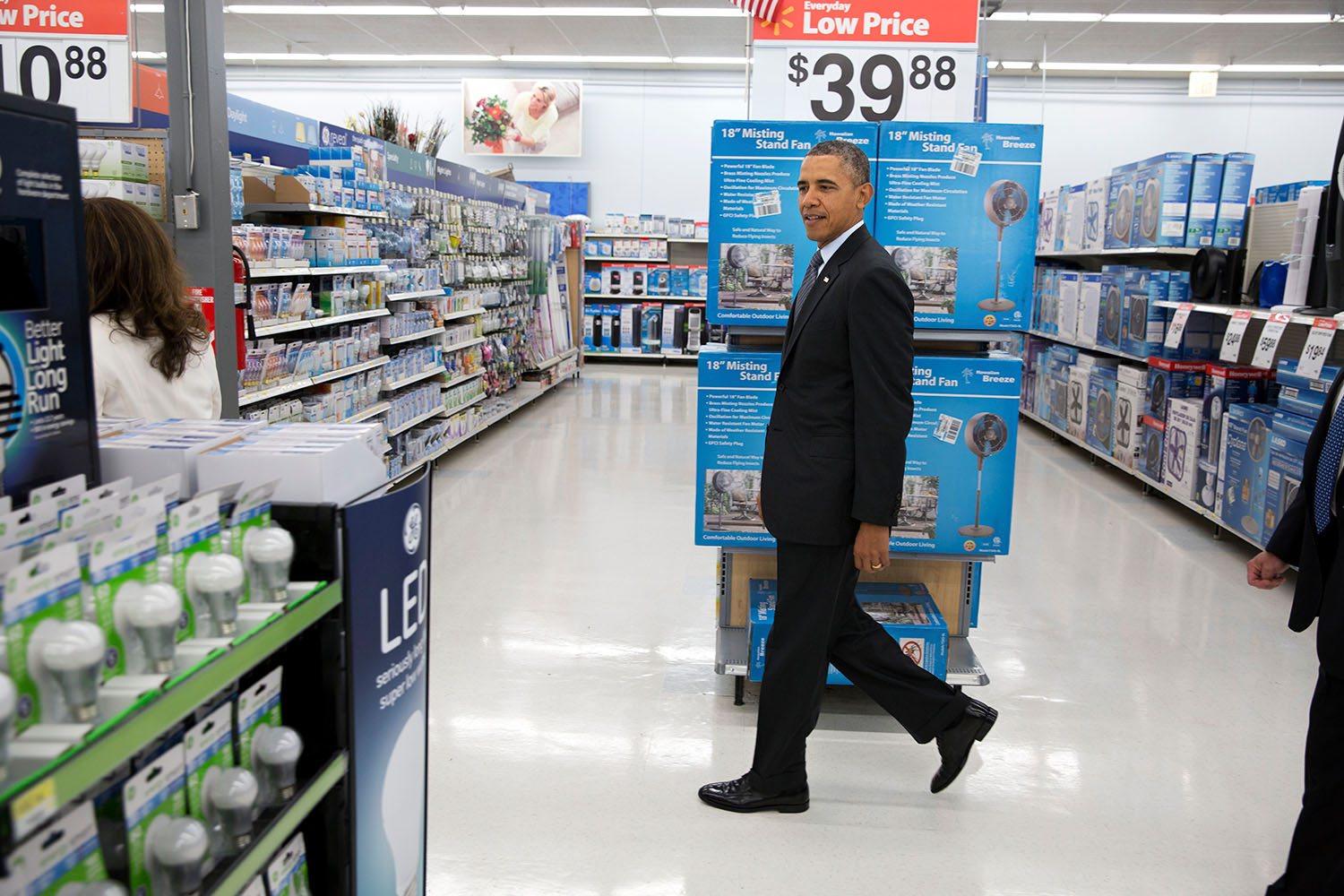
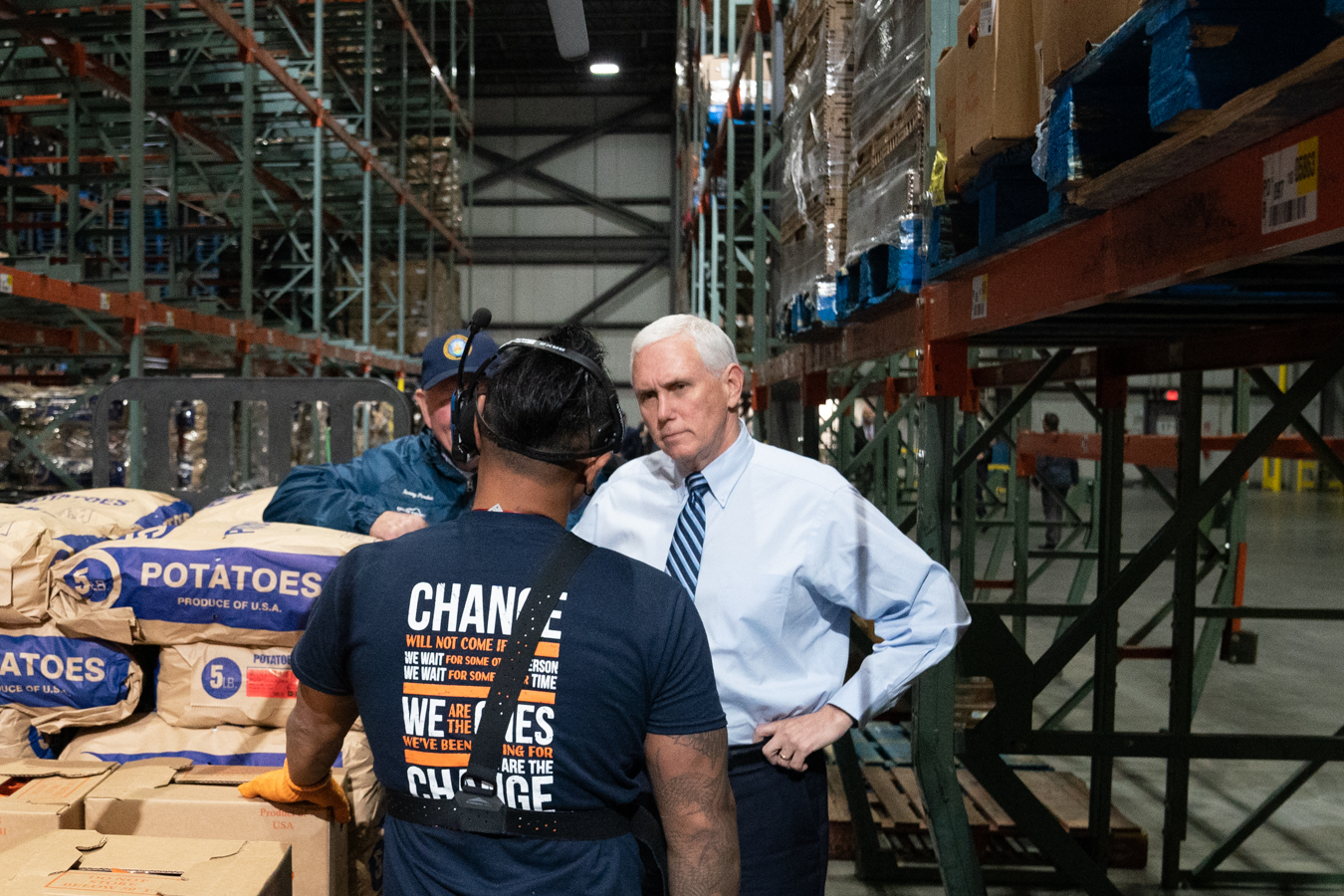
President Barack Obama walking through the aisles at Walmart and Vice President Mike Pence at a Walmart Distribution Center.

In 2020, the coronavirus (COVID-19) pandemic forced temporary measures such as store closures, limited store occupancy, large-scale employee dismissal, and enforcement of social distancing protocols. Store hours were adjusted to allow cleaning and stocking. Limits on items were placed due to the rise of panic buying.

During the pandemic, Walmart changed some employee benefits. Employees could stay home and take unpaid leave if they felt unable to work or uncomfortable coming to work. Employees who contracted the virus would receive "up to two weeks of pay". After two weeks, hourly associates who were unable to return to work were eligible for up to 26 weeks in pay. Walmart paid pandemic bonuses of $428 million. Part-time and temporary workers received a bonus of $150 while full-time workers received a bonus of $300. Starting in July 2020, customers were required to wear masks in all stores. By February 2022, these COVID restrictions were lifted.

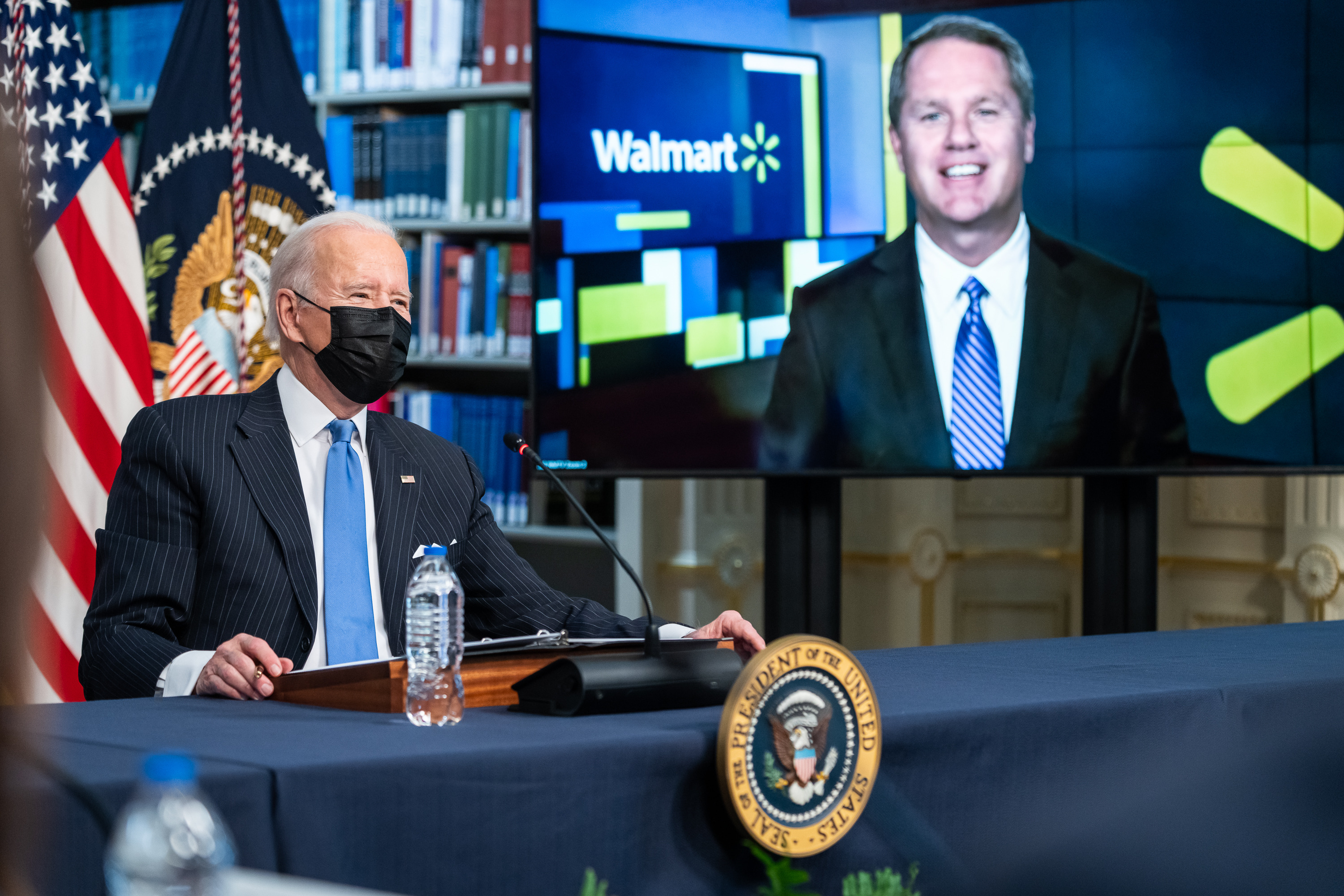
President Joe Biden meets with then CEO Doug McMillon to discuss holiday inventory, rising prices, and ongoing global supply chain challenges amid the COVID-19 pandemic.

In the first quarter of 2020, consumers responded to COVID by shopping less frequently (5.6% fewer transactions), and buying more when they did shop (16.5%). As people shifted from eating out to at home, net sales increased by 11%, while online sales rose 74%. Although Walmart experienced a 5.5% increase in operating expenses, its net income increased by 4%. In the third quarter of 2020, Walmart reported revenue of $135 billion, representing a year-on-year increase of 5%.

In December 2020, Walmart launched a new service, Carrier Pickup, that allows customers to schedule returns. In January 2021, the company launched a fintech startup, with venture partner Ribbit Capital, to provide financial products for consumers and employees. In February, Walmart acquired technology from Thunder Industries, which uses automation to create digital ads, to expand its online marketing capability. In May, Walmart acquired the Israeli startup Zeekit for $200 million. Zeekit uses AI to allow customers to try on clothing via a virtual platform. In August, Walmart announced it would open its Spark crowdsource delivery to other businesses as a white-label service, competing with Postmates and online food ordering delivery companies.

In 2021, Walmart partnered Ford and Argo AI to introduce an autonomous delivery system for customers who place online orders.

In June 2022, Walmart announced it would acquire Memomi, an AR optical tech company. In August, Walmart announced it would acquire Volt Systems, a vendor management and product tracking software company. Walmart announced it was partnering with Paramount to offer Paramount+ content to its Walmart+ subscribers in a bid to better compete with Amazon.

In August 2022, Walmart announced that locations were not going back to 24 hours with most stores now open between 6am and 11pm. In January 2023, Walmart announced it would raise its minimum wage for hourly workers from $12 to $14 an hour. Approximately 340,000 employees were expected to receive a raise, effective in March, and Walmart's U.S. average wage was expected to be over $17.50. The company announced it would be adding college degrees and certificates to its Live Better U program.

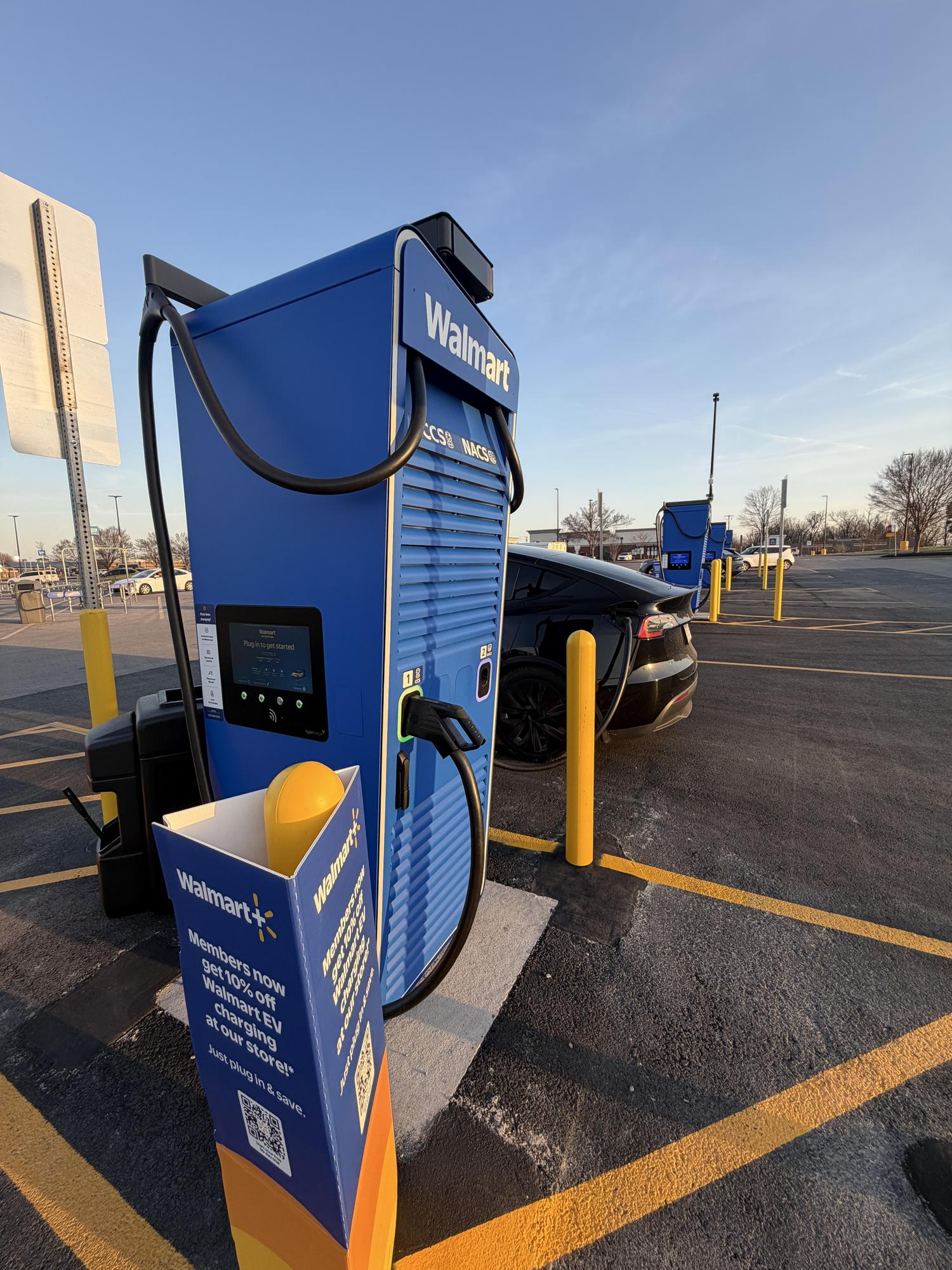
Electronic vehicle charging station of Walmart. It has a massive, in-house DC fast-charging network.

In February 2023, Walmart announced it had made $611 billion in sales in the previous financial year, up 7%. In April, the company announced it would add electric vehicle charging stations at thousands of stores by 2030, on top of the 1,300 existing stations in operation.

In January 2024, Walmart announced it would open over 150 stores in the U.S. over the next five years while remodeling 650. This was a reversal for the company, which had been in a period of de-emphasizing new store openings as it focused on online competition, in particular from Amazon, and came amid an overall greater industry focus on traditional retail in the post-pandemic area. In February, the company announced that its "Project Gigaton" initiative begun in 2017 to reduce its Scope 3 emissions from suppliers by 1 billion metric tons by 2030 had reached its goal, and 75% of net sales in fiscal year 2023 were from suppliers participating in the initiative. Walmart reported it was planning to remove the self checkout from some stores due to feedback.

In August 2024, Walmart announced a new service to transport goods from Asia to U.S. and compete more effectively with Amazon. In November, Walmart announced it was ending its diversity, equity, and inclusion (DEI) programs, in addition to delisting products designed for transgender minors such as breast binders.

In January 2025, Walmart redesigned its logo; it largely stayed the same except the word was made a little bigger, the background darker blue, and the spark slightly bigger.

App icon of Walmart

In September 2025, Walmart added Peacock to Walmart+, giving consumers an option between Peacock and Paramount+ and to switch between the two services every 90 days.

On November 20, 2025, Walmart announced that it will switch its stock exchange listing from the NYSE to the Nasdaq Global Select Market, marking the largest stock exchange transfer on record. Walmart began trading as a Nasdaq-listed security on December 9. The switch underscored how deeply technology is embedded in the company's operations and growth strategy, and positions the company for inclusion in the Nasdaq-100, which occurred on January 20, 2026.

==== Acquisitions and employee benefits ====
In February 2024, the company announced that managers would be given stock grants of up to $20,000. Walmart announced a 3–1 stock split to make it easier for employees to buy stock. Such rewards for rank-and-file employees are rare in the industry, which analysts say could generate $20 billion in revenue for the average household. The company raised the starting base salary for store managers and increased the bonus plan of up to 200% of their regular salaries.

In December 2024, Walmart acquired Vizio for $2.3 billion with the intention to expand its advertising sales in video content that streams on Vizio devices.

=== Tariffs and second Trump administration ===
In April 2025, the White House enacted an aggressive wave of sweeping import tariffs and these wide-ranging duties slapped import penalties of 30% to 50% on goods coming from major global partners. As the largest container importer in the United States, Walmart was exposed to multi-billion-dollar liabilities overnight. By mid-May 2025, Walmart's executive leadership formally addressed the financial pressure during its quarterly earnings call and publicly warned investors that the retail giant would have no choice but to raise shelf prices. They noted that while they would work to shield consumers where possible, the company's razor-thin retail margins simply could not absorb the massive influx of duties. President of the United States Donald Trump heavily criticized the retail giant on social media, demanding that Walmart and international manufacturers "eat the tariffs" internally to prevent consumer inflation.

The price changes spanned several discretionary and everyday inventory categories. Shoppers faced immediate, noticeable price hikes on toys, household appliances, furniture, and clothing. Even food items were temporarily affected before a subsequent executive order offered exemptions for specific agricultural shortages.

The legal and economic landscape changed entirely in early 2026, when the Supreme Court of the United States ruled that the administration's sweeping use of emergency powers to collect those specific international tariffs imposed under International Emergency Economic Powers Act was unconstitutional. This landmark judicial reversal forced the federal government to completely unwind the system and open up a recovery framework for American corporations. By April 2026, United States Customs and Border Protection began processing more than $160 billion in valid corporate claims to refund the illegally collected duties back to major U.S. importers. Walmart became eligible to claw back roughly $2.4 billion in government tariff refunds, a sum representing slightly less than half of 1% of its total annual domestic sales.

== Operating divisions ==
Map of countries with Walmart stores Legend: Current market locations Former market locations No current market locations

As of 2016, Walmart's operations are organized into four divisions: Walmart U.S., Walmart International, Sam's Club and Global eCommerce. In the United States, Walmart's stores operate in four formats: discount, Supercenters, Neighborhood Markets, and Sam's Club stores. Walmart International stores include additional formats such as supermarkets, hypermarkets, cash-and-carry stores, home improvement, specialty electronics, restaurants, apparel stores, drugstores, and convenience stores.

=== Walmart U.S. ===
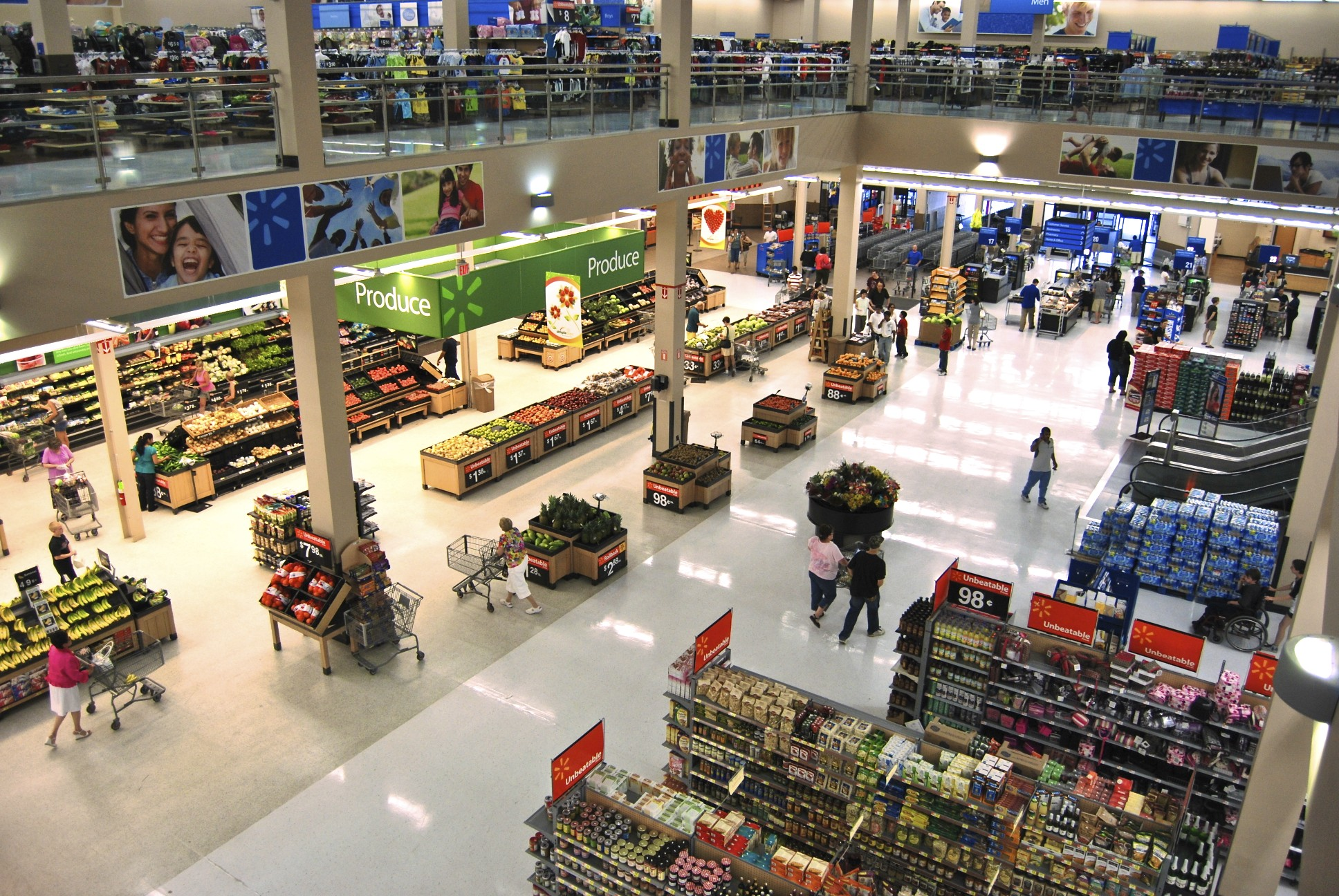
Interior of the two-story Wal-Mart Supercenter at Crossgates Commons, the largest in the United States, in Albany, New York.

Walmart U.S. is the company's largest division, reaching $462 billion in revenue for fiscal year 2025. It consists of three retail formats that have become commonplace in the United States: Supercenters, Discount Stores, Neighborhood Markets, and other small formats. The discount stores sell a variety of mostly non-grocery products, though emphasis has shifted towards supercenters, which include more groceries. As of January 2025, there are a total of 4,605 Walmart U.S. stores. In the United States, 90% of the population resides within 10 miles of a Walmart store. The president and CEO of Walmart U.S. is David Guggina.

==== Walmart Supercenter ====
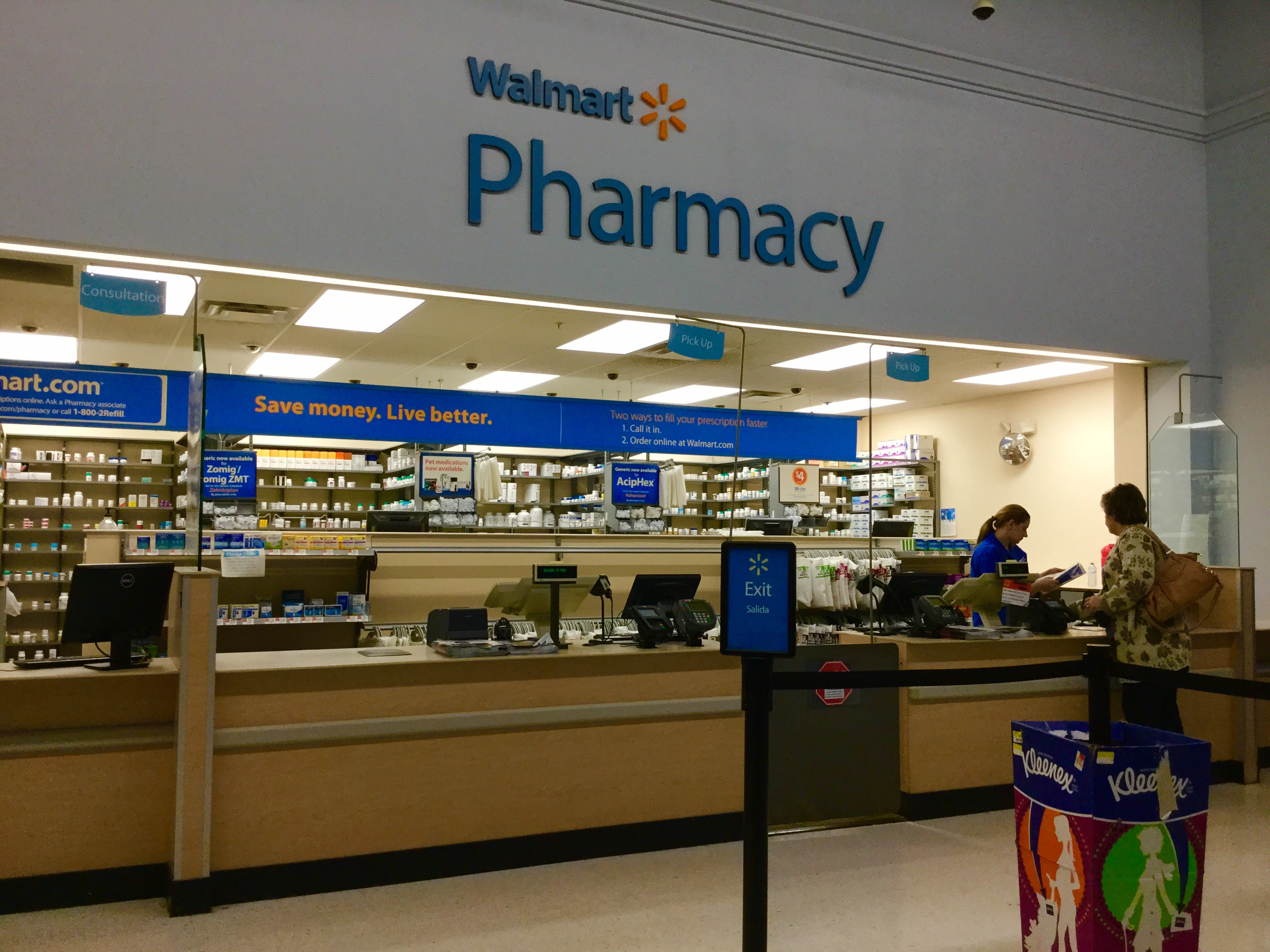
Walmart Pharmacy inside a Walmart store.

Walmart Supercenters (Supercentres in Canada), branded simply as "Walmart", are hypermarkets with sizes varying from 69,000 to 260,000 square feet (6,400 to 24,200 square meters), but averaging about 178,000 square feet (16,500 square meters). These stock general merchandise and a full-service supermarket. Many Walmart Supercenters also have a garden center, pet shop, pharmacy, Tire & Lube Express, optical center, one-hour photo processing lab, portrait studio, and numerous alcove shops, such as cellular phone stores, hair and nail salons, video rental stores, local bank branches (such as Woodforest National Bank branches in newer locations), and fast food outlets.

Depending on location, Walmart Supercenters can feature McDonald's, Wendy's, Burger King, Auntie Anne's, Domino's, Taco Bell, Dunkin' Donuts, or Subway restaurants. In some Canadian locations, Tim Hortons were opened. Some U.S. locations have Claire's and small arcades called GamePlay. Very few U.S. locations have KFC, Hardee's, Papa John's, Dairy Queen, Checkers and Rally's, Little Caesars, and A&W Restaurants.

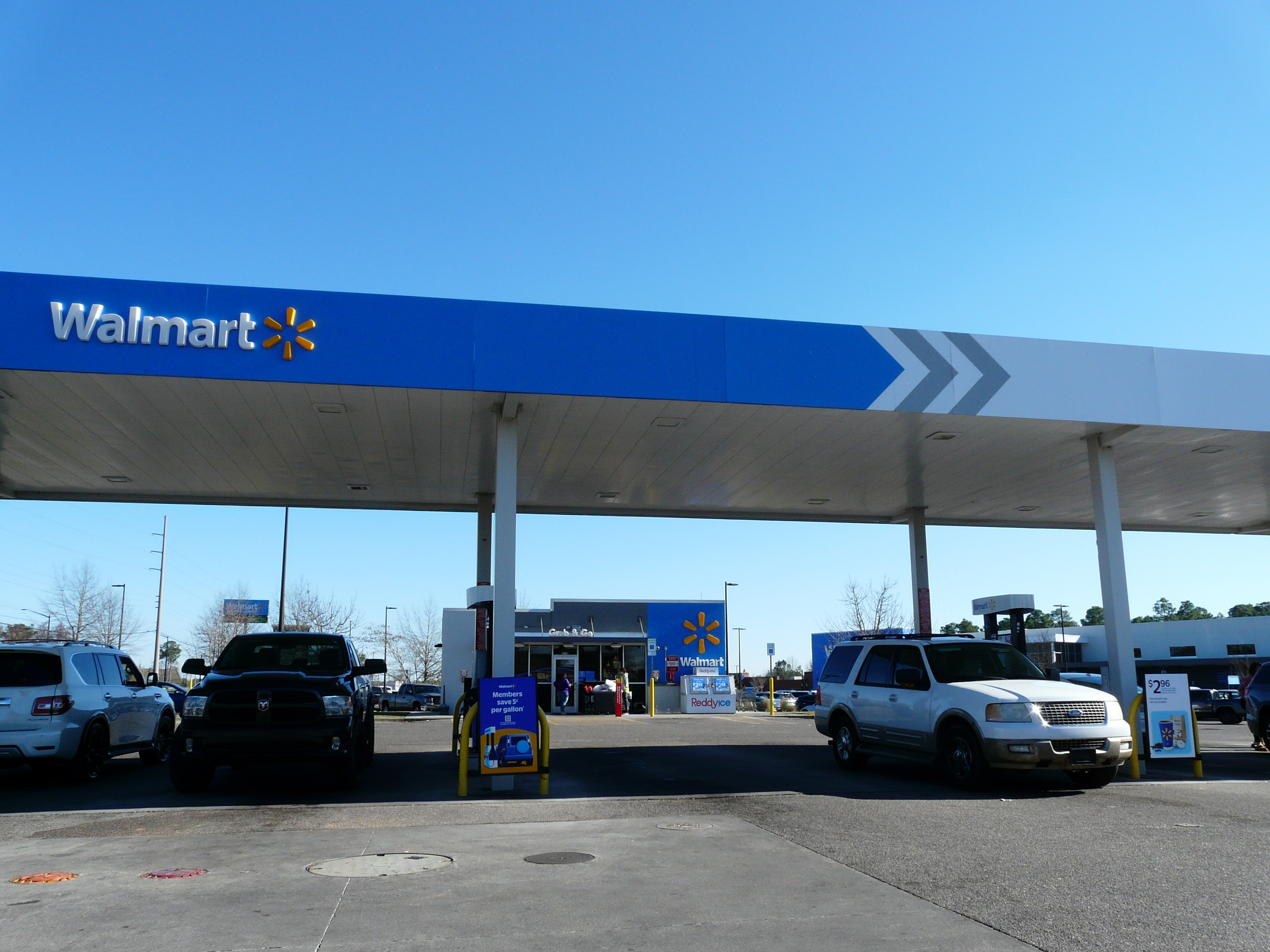
Walmart Gas station at the Walmart Neighborhood Market on West Main Street in Dothan, Alabama.

Some locations also have fuel stations which sell gasoline distributed by Murphy USA (which spun off from Murphy Oil in 2013), Sunoco ("Optima"), the Tesoro Corporation ("Mirastar"), USA Gasoline, and even now Walmart-branded gas stations.

The first Supercenter opened in Washington, Missouri, in 1988. A similar concept, Hypermart USA, had opened a year earlier in Garland, Texas. All Hypermart USA stores were later closed or converted into Supercenters.

As of January 2025, there were 3,559 Walmart Supercenters throughout the U.S. The largest Supercenter in the world, covering 260,000 square feet (24,000 square meters) on two floors, is located in Crossgates Commons in Albany, New York.

A typical supercenter sells approximately 120,000 items, compared to the 35 million products sold in Walmart's online store.

The "Supercenter" name has since been phased out, with these stores now simply referred to as "Walmart", since the company introduced the new Walmart logo in 2008. However, the branding is still used in Walmart's Canadian stores (spelled as "Supercentre" in Canadian English).

==== Walmart Discount Store ====
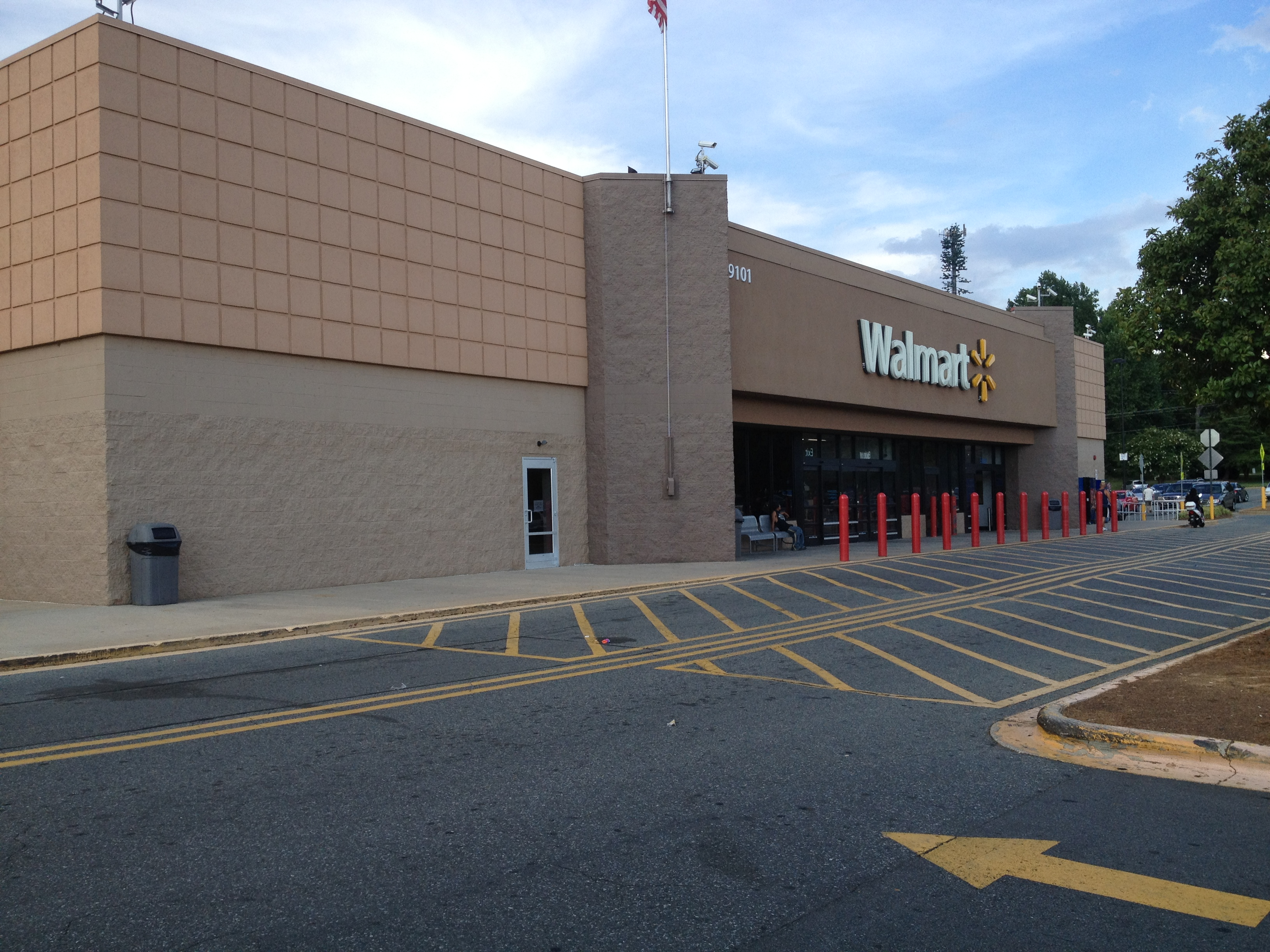
The exterior of a Walmart Discount Store in Charlotte, North Carolina (Store #1821)

Walmart Discount Stores, also branded as simply "Walmart", are discount department stores with sizes varying from 30,000 to 221,000 square feet (2,800 to 20,500 square meters), with the average store covering 105,000 square feet (9,800 square meters). They carry general merchandise and limited groceries.

In 1990, Walmart opened its first Bud's Discount City location in Bentonville. Bud's operated as a closeout store, much like Big Lots.

At its peak in 1996, there were 1,995 Walmart Discount Stores; as of October 31, 2022, that number had dropped to 365.

==== Walmart Neighborhood Market ====
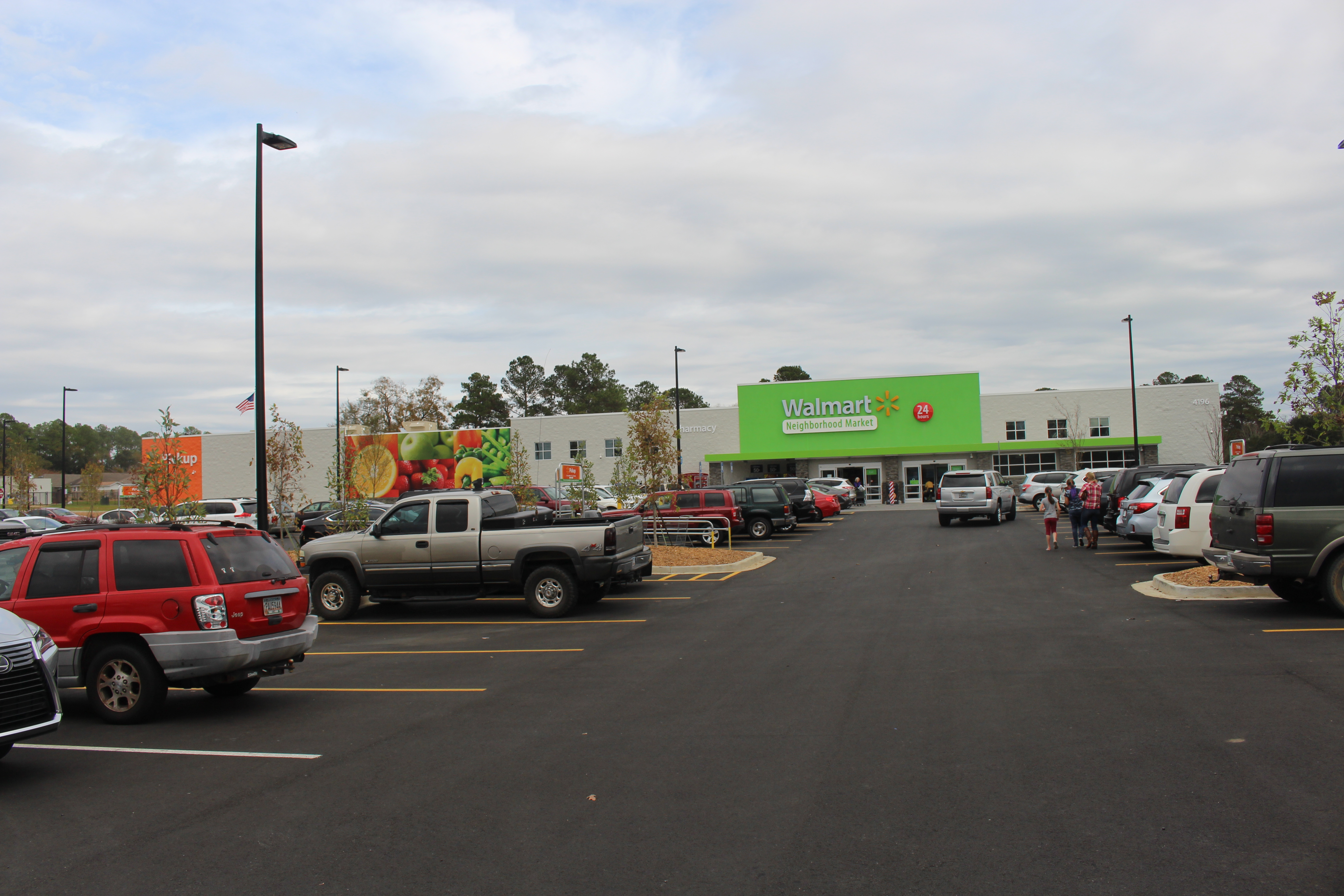
A 24-hour Walmart Neighborhood Market in Valdosta, Georgia (Store #6732)

Walmart Neighborhood Market, also known as "Neighborhood Market by Walmart" or informally known as "Neighborhood Walmart", is about a fifth of the size of a Walmart Supercenter. The first Walmart Neighborhood Market opened ten years after the first Supercenter opened, but Walmart did not heavily focus on this model until the 2010s.

These stores predominantly sell groceries, but also feature a modest amount of household items and general merchandise, in a format of a general store.

Neighborhood Market stores expanded slowly at first as a way to fill gaps between Walmart Supercenters and Discount Stores in existing markets. In its first 12 years, the company opened about 180 Walmart Neighborhood Markets. By 2010, Walmart said it was ready to accelerate its expansion plans for the grocery stores. Similar to the Supercenter models, the Neighborhood Market branding has phased out overtime, with several stores adopting the Walmart Market branding, with the name of the municipality put with "Market." As of October 31, 2022, there were 682 Walmart Neighborhood Markets.

==== Former stores and concepts ====
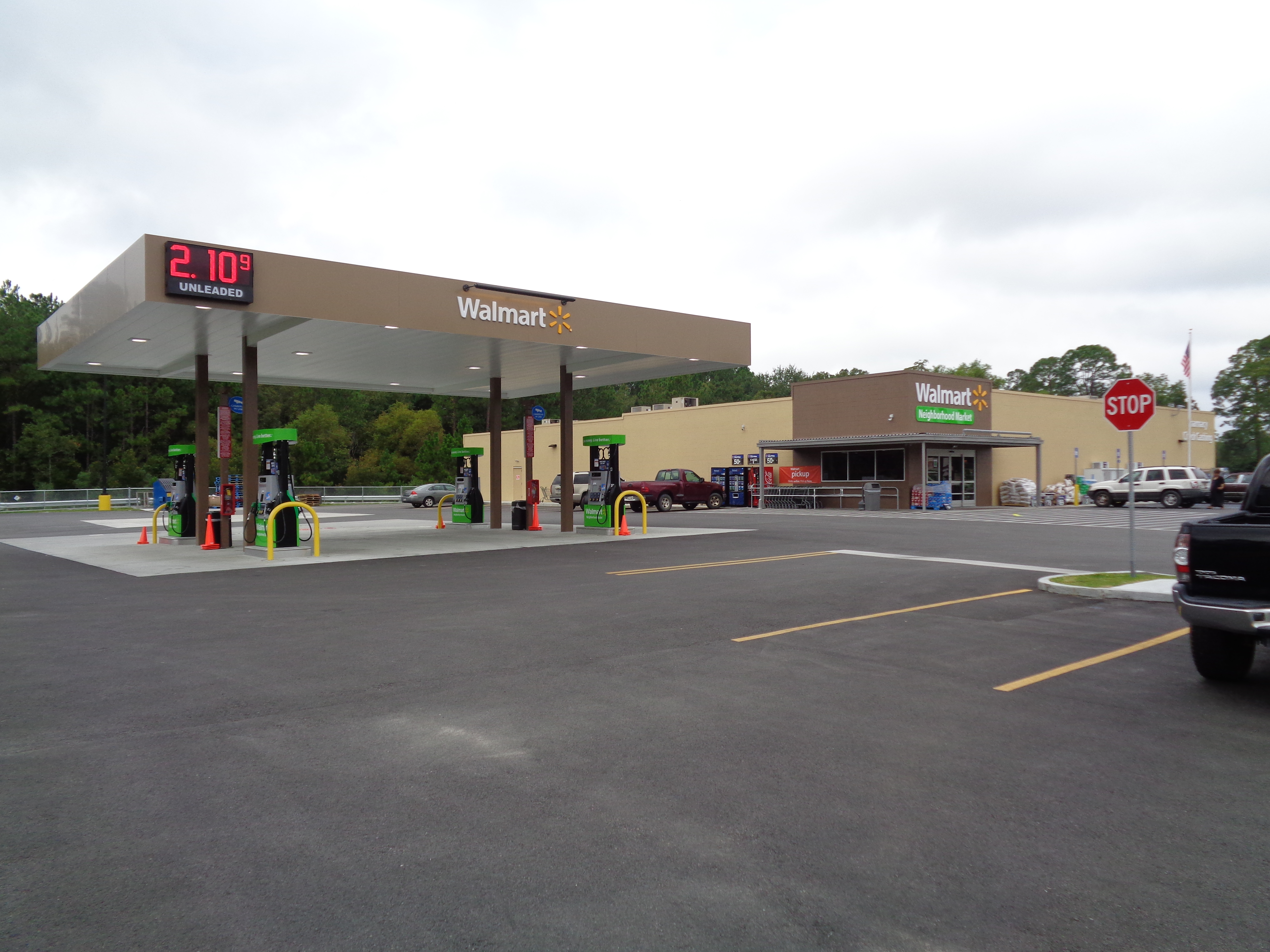
A Walmart Neighborhood Market originally planned to be a Walmart Express in Alma, Georgia in September 2015 (Store #4229). This location closed in 2016 as part of a plan to close 269 stores globally.

Walmart opened Supermercado de Walmart locations to appeal to Hispanic communities in the United States. The first one, a 39,000-square-foot (3,600-square-meter) store in the Spring Branch area of Houston, opened on April 29, 2009. The store was a conversion of an existing Walmart Neighborhood Market. In 2009, another Supermercado de Walmart opened in Phoenix, Arizona. Both locations closed in 2014. In 2009, Walmart opened "Más Club", a warehouse retail operation patterned after Sam's Club. Its lone store also closed in 2014.

Walmart Express was a chain of smaller discount stores with a range of services from groceries to check cashing and gasoline service. The concept was focused on small towns deemed unable to support a larger store and large cities where space was at a premium. On January 15, 2016, Walmart announced that it would be closing 269 stores globally, including the 102 Neighborhood Markets that were formerly or originally planned to be Express stores.

Between 2002 and 2022, Walmart owned the Amigo supermarkets chain in Puerto Rico. In 2022, Walmart announced that it would sell its Amigo stores to Pueblo Inc. and focus on modernizing its 18 Supercenter and Division 1 formats and seven Sam's Club stores.

==== Initiatives ====
In September 2006, Walmart announced a pilot program to sell generic drugs at $4 per prescription. The program was launched at stores in the Tampa, Florida, area, and by January 2007 had been expanded to all stores in Florida. While the average price of generics was $29 per prescription, compared to $102 for name-brand drugs, Walmart maintained that it was not selling at a loss, or providing them as an act of charity—instead using the same mechanisms of mass distribution it has used to bring lower prices to other products. Many of Walmart's low cost generics are imported from India, where they are made by drug makers that include Ranbaxy Laboratories and Cipla.

On February 6, 2007, the company launched a "beta" version of a movie download service, which sold about 3,000 films and television episodes from all major studios and television networks. The service was discontinued on December 21, 2007, due to low sales.

In 2008, Walmart started a pilot program in the small grocery store concept called Marketside in the metropolitan Phoenix, Arizona area. The four stores closed in 2011.

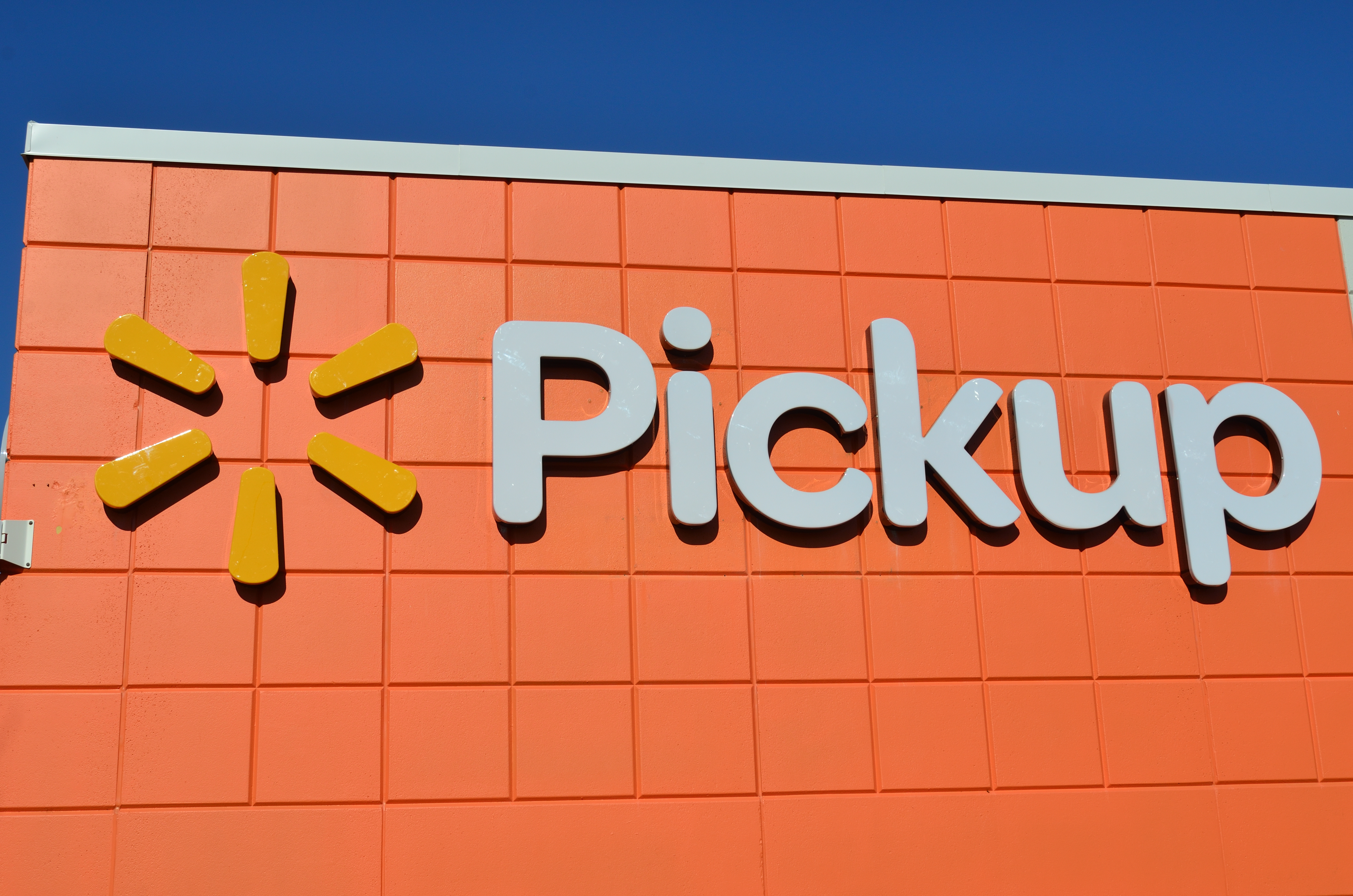
A Walmart Pickup location in Canada

In 2015, Walmart began testing a free grocery pickup service, allowing customers to select products online and choose their pickup time. At the store, a Walmart employee loads the groceries into the customer's car. As of December 17, 2017, the service is available in 39 U.S. states.

In May 2016, Walmart announced a change to ShippingPass, its three-day shipping service, and that it would move from a three-day delivery to two-day delivery to remain competitive with Amazon. Walmart priced it at 49 dollars per year, compared to Amazon Prime's 99-dollar-per-year price.

In June 2016, Walmart and Sam's Club announced that it would begin testing a last-mile grocery delivery that used services including Uber, Lyft, and Deliv, to bring customers' orders to their homes. Walmart customers would be able to shop using the company's online grocery service at grocery.walmart.com, then request delivery at checkout for a small fee. The first tests were planned to go live in Denver and Phoenix. Walmart announced on March 14, 2018, that it would expand online delivery to 100 metropolitan regions in the United States, the equivalent of 40% of households, by the end of the year of 2018.

Walmart's Winemakers Selection private label wine was introduced in June 2018 in about 1,100 stores. The wine, from domestic and international sources, was described by Washington Post food and wine columnist Dave McIntyre as notably good for the inexpensive ($11 to $16 per bottle) price level.

The Walmart+ logo used until 2025.

The Walmart+ logo used since 2025.

In October 2019, Walmart announced that customers in 2,000 locations in 29 states can use the grocery pickup service for their adult beverage purchases. Walmart will also deliver adult beverages from nearly 200 stores across California and Florida.

In February 2020, Walmart announced a new membership program called "Walmart+" to better compete with Amazon Prime. The news came shortly after Walmart announced the discontinuation of its personal shopping service, Jetblack. According to data tracked by Morgan Stanley, in January 2026, Walmart+ had 28.4 million members.

==== Numbers of stores by state ====
Locations as of October 1, 2022

State	Supercenters	Discount Stores	Neighborhood Markets	Amigos	Sam's Clubs	Other Pharmacy Formats	Total stores
Alabama	101	1	28		13	1	144
Alaska	7	2					9
Arizona	84	2	26		12		124
Arkansas	76	5	33		11	8	133
California	144	68	66		30	1	309
Colorado	70	4	14		17		105
Connecticut	12	21			1		34
Delaware	6	3			1		10
District of Columbia	3						3
Florida	232	9	98		46	2	387
Georgia	154	2	31		24	4	215
Hawaii		10			2		12
Idaho	23		3		1		27
Illinois	139	15	5		25		184
Indiana	97	6	9		13	2	127
Iowa	58	2			9		69
Kansas	58	2	14		9		83
Kentucky	77	7	7		9	1	101
Louisiana	88	2	33		14	1	138
Maine	19	3			3		25
Maryland	31	16			11	2	60
Massachusetts	27	21					48
Michigan	90	3			23	1	117
Minnesota	65	3			12		80
Mississippi	65	3	10		7	1	86
Missouri	112	9	16		19		156
Montana	14				2		16
Nebraska	35		7		5		47
Nevada	30	2	11		7		50
New Hampshire	19	7			2		28
New Jersey	35	27			8		70
New Mexico	35	2	9		7		53
New York	82	16	1		12		111
North Carolina	143	6	43		22		214
North Dakota	14				3		17
Ohio	138	5			27		170
Oklahoma	81	7	33		13		134
Oregon	29	7	9				45
Pennsylvania	116	20			24		160
Puerto Rico	13	5		11	7		36
Rhode Island	5	4					9
South Carolina	83		26		13		122
South Dakota	15				2		17
Tennessee	117	1	18		14		150
Texas	391	18	97		82	5	593
Utah	41		10		8		59
Vermont	3	3					6
Virginia	110	4	20		15		149
Washington	52	9	4				65
West Virginia	38				5	1	44
Wisconsin	83	4	2		10		99
Wyoming	12				2		14

=== Walmart International ===
Walmart International operated in 19 countries outside the U.S. with 5,591 units. International retail units range from 1,400 to 186,000 square feet (130 to 17,280 square meters), while wholesale units range from 24,000 to 158,000 square feet (2,200 to 14,700 square meters). Chris Nicholas is the president and CEO of Walmart International.

==== Central America ====
Walmart also owns 51% of the Central American Retail Holding Company (CARHCO), which, as of October 31, 2022, consists of 868 stores, including 263 stores in Guatemala (under the Paiz, Walmart Supercenter, Despensa Familiar, and Maxi Dispensa banners), 102 stores in El Salvador (under the Despensa Familiar, La Despensa de Don Juan, Walmart Supercenter, and Maxi Despensa banners), 111 stores in Honduras (including the Paiz, Walmart Supercenter, Dispensa Familiar, and Maxi Despensa banners), 102 stores in Nicaragua (including the Pali, La Unión, Maxi Pali, and Walmart Supercenter banners), and 290 stores in Costa Rica (including the Maxi Pali, Mas X Menos, Walmart Supercenter, and Pali banners).

==== Chile ====
In January 2009, the company acquired a controlling interest in the largest grocer in Chile, Distribución y Servicio D&S SA. In 2010, the company was renamed Walmart Chile. As of October 31, 2022, Walmart Chile operates around 384 stores under the banners Lider, Express de Lider, Superbodega Acuenta, and Central Mayorista.

==== Mexico ====
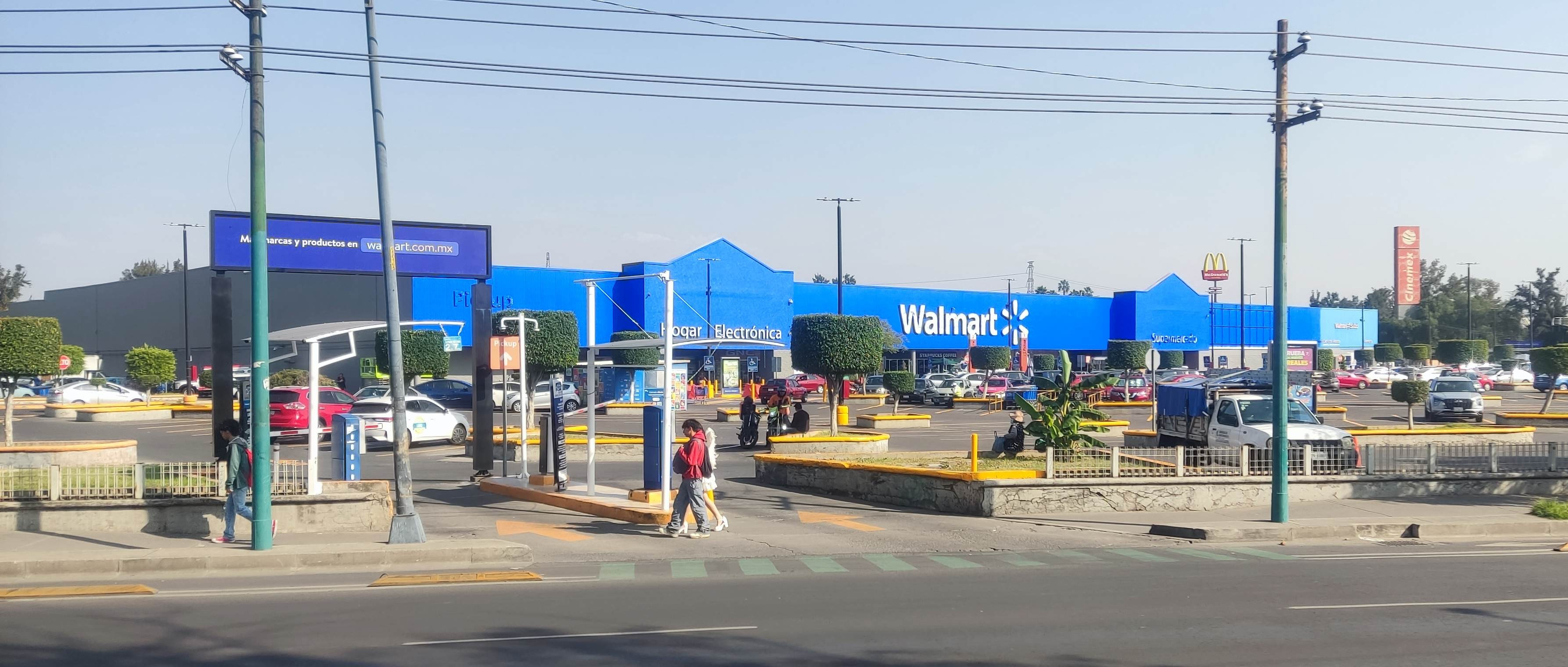
Walmart at Gustavo A. Madero, Mexico City.

Walmart opened its first international store in Mexico in 1991.As of October 31, 2022, Walmart's Mexico division, the largest outside the U.S., consisted of 2,804 stores. Walmart in Mexico operates Walmart Supercenter, Sam's Club, Bodega Aurrera, Mi Bodega Aurrera, Bodega Aurrera Express and Walmart Express.

==== Canada ====
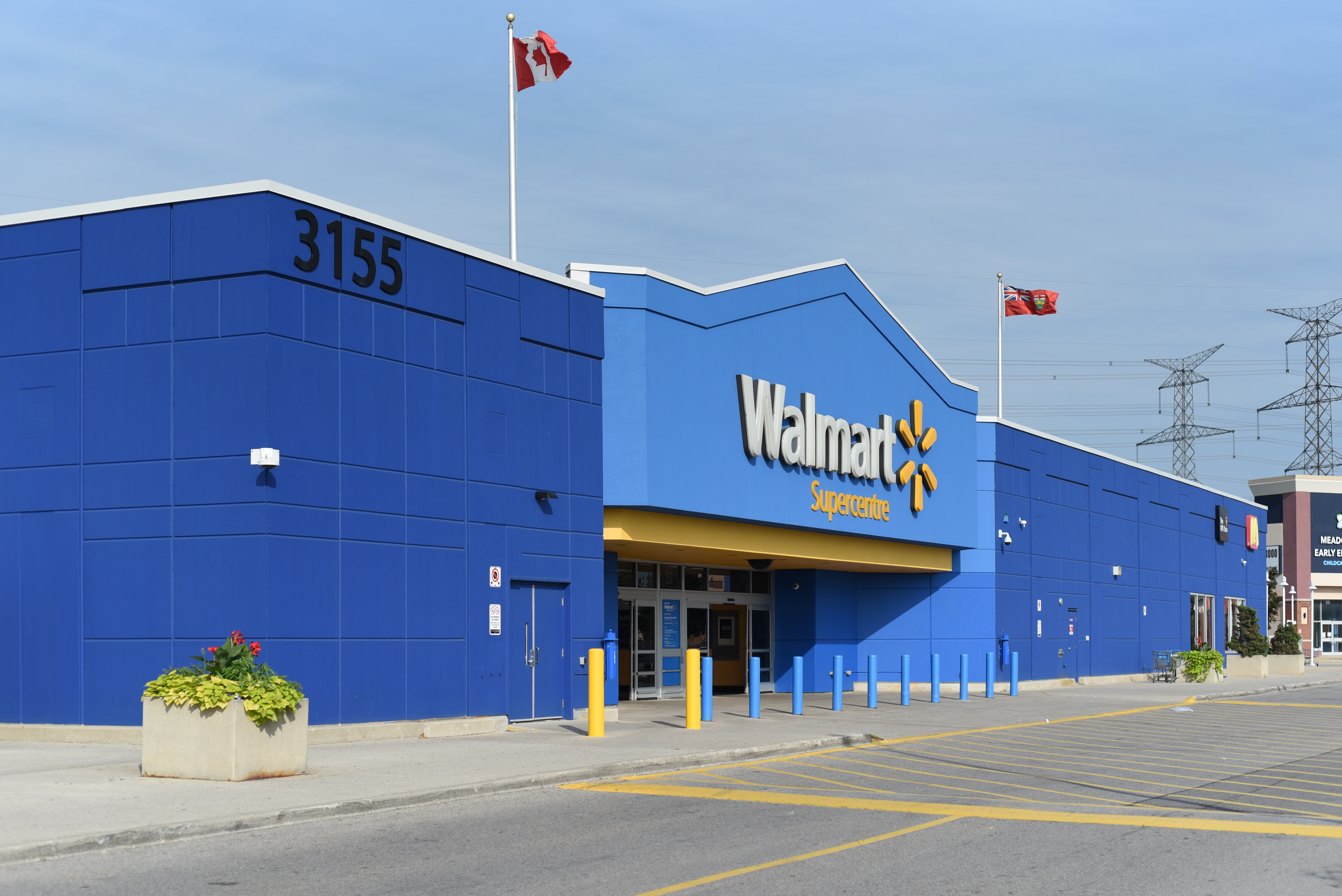
Walmart Supercentre in Mississauga, Ontario, Canada in July 2025

Walmart has operated in Canada since it acquired 122 stores comprising the Woolco division of Woolworth Canada, Inc on January 14, 1994. As of October 31, 2022, it operates 402 locations (including 343 supercentres and 59 discount stores) and, as of June 2015, it employs 89,358 people, with a local home office in Mississauga, Ontario. Walmart Canada's first three Supercentres (spelled in Canadian English) opened in November 2006 in Ancaster, London, and Stouffville, Ontario.

==== Africa ====
On September 28, 2010, Walmart announced it would buy Massmart Holdings Ltd. of Johannesburg, South Africa in a deal worth over US$4 billion giving the company its first footprint in Africa. As of October 31, 2022, it has 411 stores, including 361 stores in South Africa (under the banners Game Foodco, CBW, Game, Builders Express, Builders Warehouse, Cambridge, Rhino, Makro, Builders Trade Depot, Jumbo, and Builders Superstore), 11 stores in Botswana (under the banners CBW, Game Foodco, and Builders Warehouse), 4 stores in Ghana (under the Game Foodco banner), 4 stores in Kenya (under the banners Game Foodco and Builders Warehouse), 3 stores in Lesotho (under the banners CBW and Game Foodco), 2 stores in Malawi (under the Game banner), 6 stores in Mozambique (under the banners Builders Warehouse, Game Foodco, CBW, and Builders Express), 5 stores in Namibia (under the banners Game Foodco and Game), 5 stores in Nigeria (under the banners Game and Game Foodco), 1 store in Eswatini (under the CBW banner), 1 store in Tanzania (under the Game Foodco banner), 1 store in Uganda (under the Game banner), and 7 stores in Zambia (under the banners CBW, Game Foodco, Builders Warehouse, and Builders Express).

==== China ====
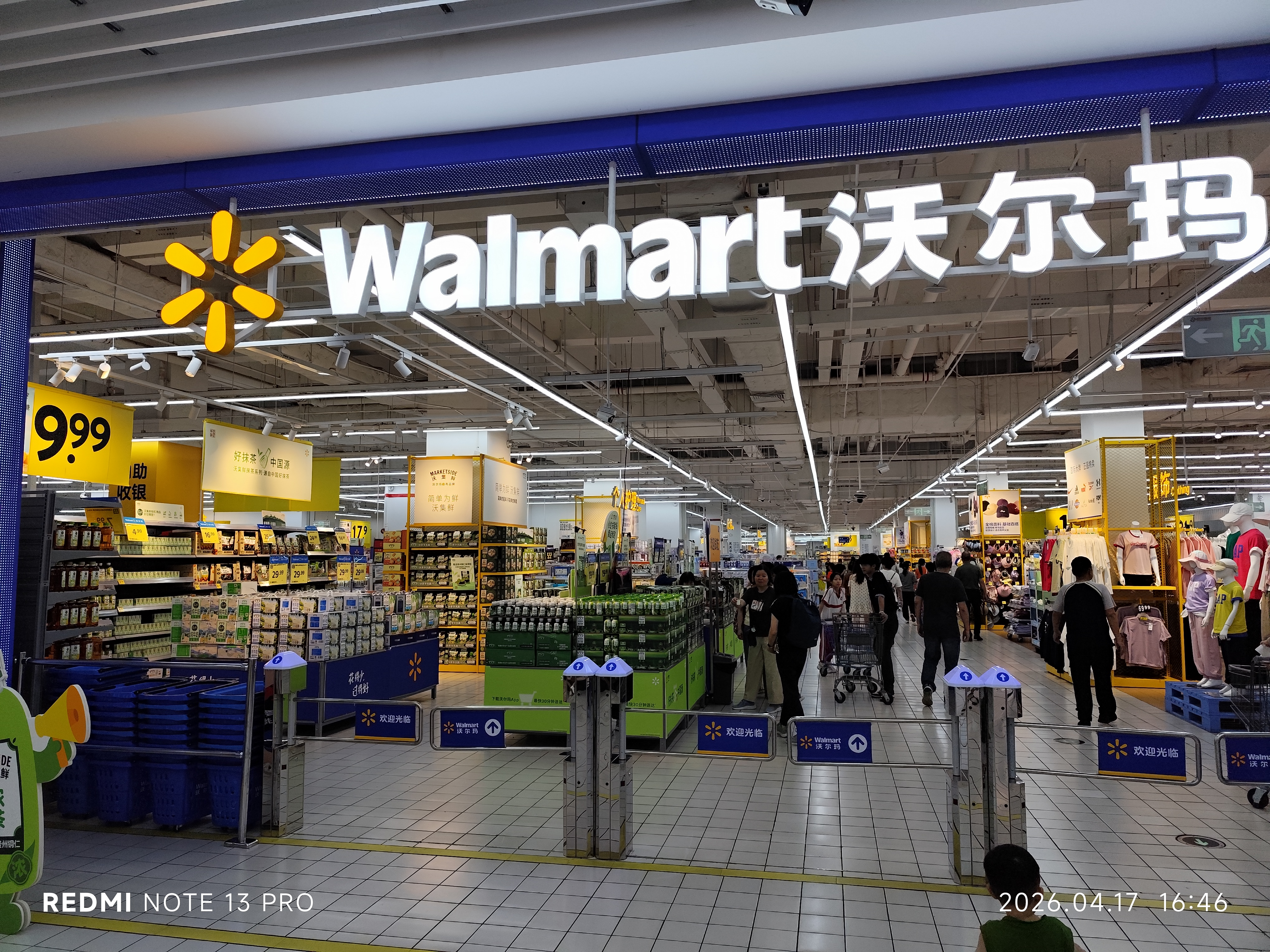
Walmart Supermarket shop at JianJi Commercial Center Plaza Mall at Heyuan, Guangdong.

Walmart has joint ventures in China and several majority-owned subsidiaries. As of October 31, 2022, Walmart China (沃尔玛 Wò'ērmǎ) operates 369 stores under the Walmart Supercenter and Sam's Club banners.

In October 2016, Walmart launched the Food Safety Collaboration Center in Beijing, China. The goal of this investment is to collaborate with the local government, promote the use of blockchain technology in tracking pork supply in China, and enhance the transparency and safety of the food supply chain.

In December 2021, the Chinese Communist Party's Central Commission for Discipline Inspection warned Walmart about removing products made from inputs from Xinjiang in response to the Uyghur Forced Labor Prevention Act.

==== India ====
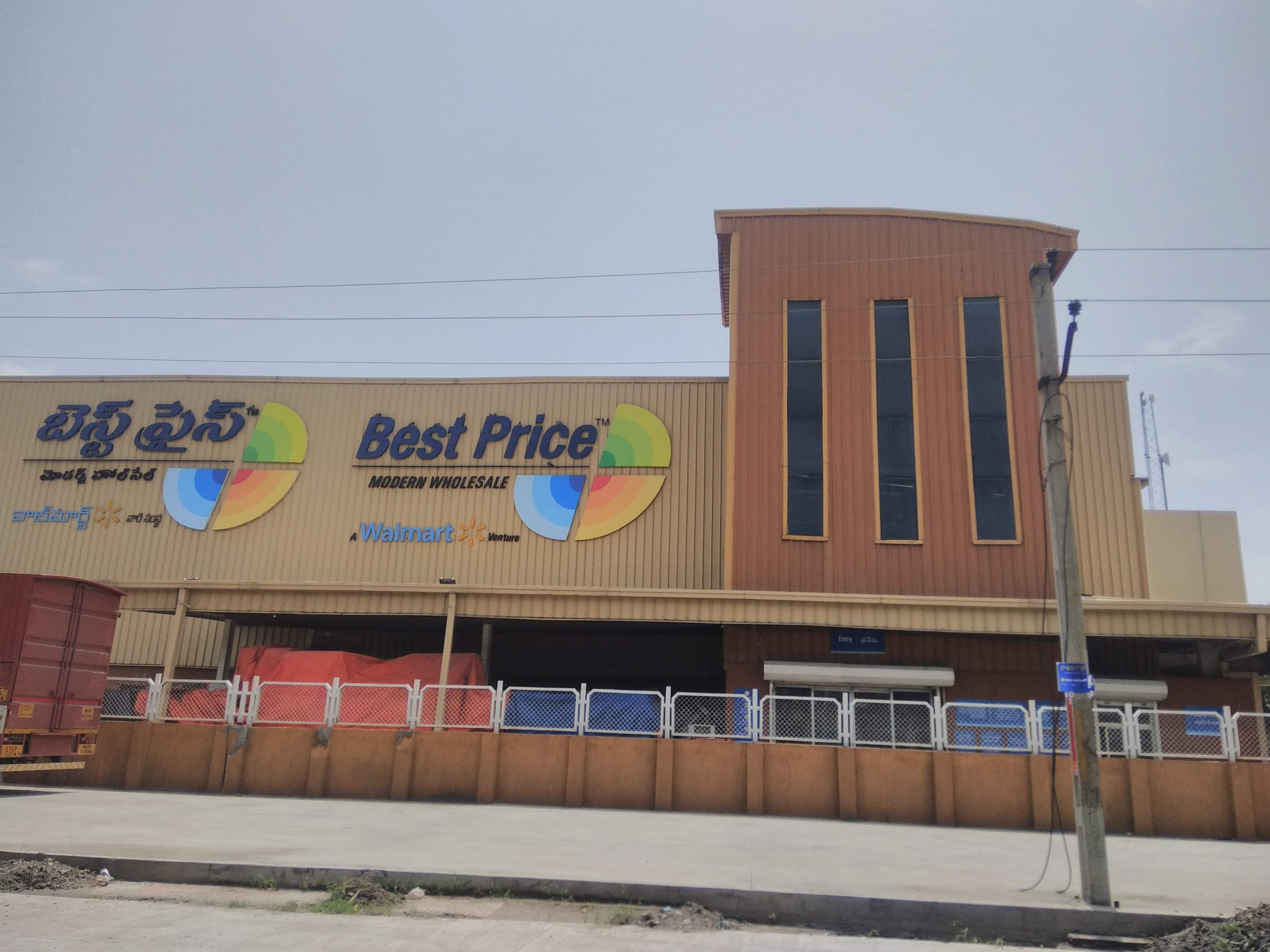
A Best Price Modern Wholesale store in Hyderabad

In November 2006, the company announced a joint venture with Bharti Enterprises to operate in India. As foreign corporations were not allowed to enter the retail sector directly, Walmart operated through franchises and handled the wholesale end of the business. The first store opened in Amritsar on May 30, 2009. On September 14, 2012, the Government of India approved 51% FDI in multi-brand retails, subject to approval by individual states, effective September 20, 2012. Expansion into India faced some significant problems. In November 2012, Walmart admitted to spending US$25 million lobbying the Indian National Congress; lobbying is conventionally considered bribery in India. Walmart is conducting an internal investigation into potential violations of the Foreign Corrupt Practices Act. Bharti Walmart suspended a number of employees to ensure "a complete and thorough investigation". In October 2013, Bharti and Walmart separated to pursue business independently.

On May 9, 2018, Walmart announced its intent to acquire a 77% majority stake in the Indian e-commerce company Flipkart for $16 billion, in a deal that was completed on August 18, 2018. As of October 31, 2022, there are 28 Best Price Modern Wholesale locations.

In India, through Flipkart, Walmart owns or controls several major brands and platforms including Myntra (fashion and lifestyle), Shopsy (budget social commerce), Cleartrip (travel bookings), Flipkart Health+ (digital healthcare and pharmacy), Ekart (logistics and delivery), Jeeves (electronics repair and installation services), and ANS Commerce (D2C e-commerce enablement). Walmart is also the largest shareholder in PhonePe, one of India's biggest digital payments and fintech platforms. In addition, Walmart operates the Best Price cash-and-carry wholesale business and supports kirana stores and MSMEs through Flipkart Wholesale.

==== Indonesia ====
Walmart entered Indonesia with the opening of stores in Lippo Supermall (now known as Supermal Karawaci) and Megamall Pluit (now known as Pluit Village) respectively, under a joint-venture agreement with local conglomerate Lippo Group. Both stores closed due to the 1997 Asian financial crisis.

==== Germany ====
In Germany, Walmart took over supermarket chain Wertkauf with its 21 stores for DM750 million in 1997 and the following year Walmart acquired 74 InterSPAR stores for DM1.3 billion. In July 2006, Walmart announced its withdrawal from Germany due to sustained losses. The stores were sold to the German company Metro. Walmart did not disclose its losses from its German investment, but they were estimated to be around €3 billion.

==== South America ====
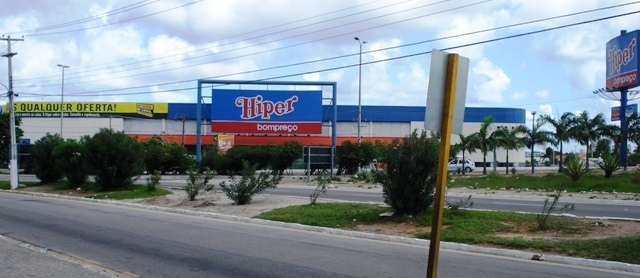
A Hiper Bompreço in Natal, Brazil in May 2008

In 2004, Walmart bought the 118 stores in the Bompreço supermarket chain in northeastern Brazil. In late 2005, it took control of the Brazilian operations of Sonae Distribution Group through its new subsidiary, WMS Supermercados do Brasil, thus acquiring control of the Nacional and Mercadorama supermarket chains, the leaders in the Rio Grande do Sul and Paraná states, respectively. None of these stores were rebranded. As of January 2014, Walmart operated 61 Bompreço supermarkets, 39 Hiper Bompreço stores. It also ran 57 Walmart Supercenters, 27 Sam's Clubs, and 174 Todo Dia stores. With the acquisition of Bompreço and Sonae, by 2010, Walmart was the third-largest supermarket chain in Brazil, behind Carrefour and Pão de Açúcar.

Walmart Brasil, the operating company, has its head office in Barueri, São Paulo State, and regional offices in Curitiba, Paraná; Porto Alegre, Rio Grande do Sul; Recife, Pernambuco; and Salvador, Bahia. Walmart Brasil operates under the banners Todo Dia, Nacional, Bompreço, Walmart Supercenter, Maxxi Atacado, Hipermercado Big, Hiper Bompreço, Sam's Club, Mercadorama, Walmart Posto (Gas Station), Supermercado Todo Dia, and Hiper Todo Dia. In 2016, the company started converting Hiper Bompreço and Big stores into Walmart Supercenters and Bompreço, Nacional and Mercadorama stores into the Walmart Supermercado brand.

Since August 2018, Walmart Inc. only holds a minority stake in Walmart Brasil, which was renamed Grupo Big on August 12, 2019, with 20% of the company's shares, and private equity firm Advent International holding 80% ownership of the company. On March 24, 2021, it was announced that Carrefour would be acquiring Grupo Big.

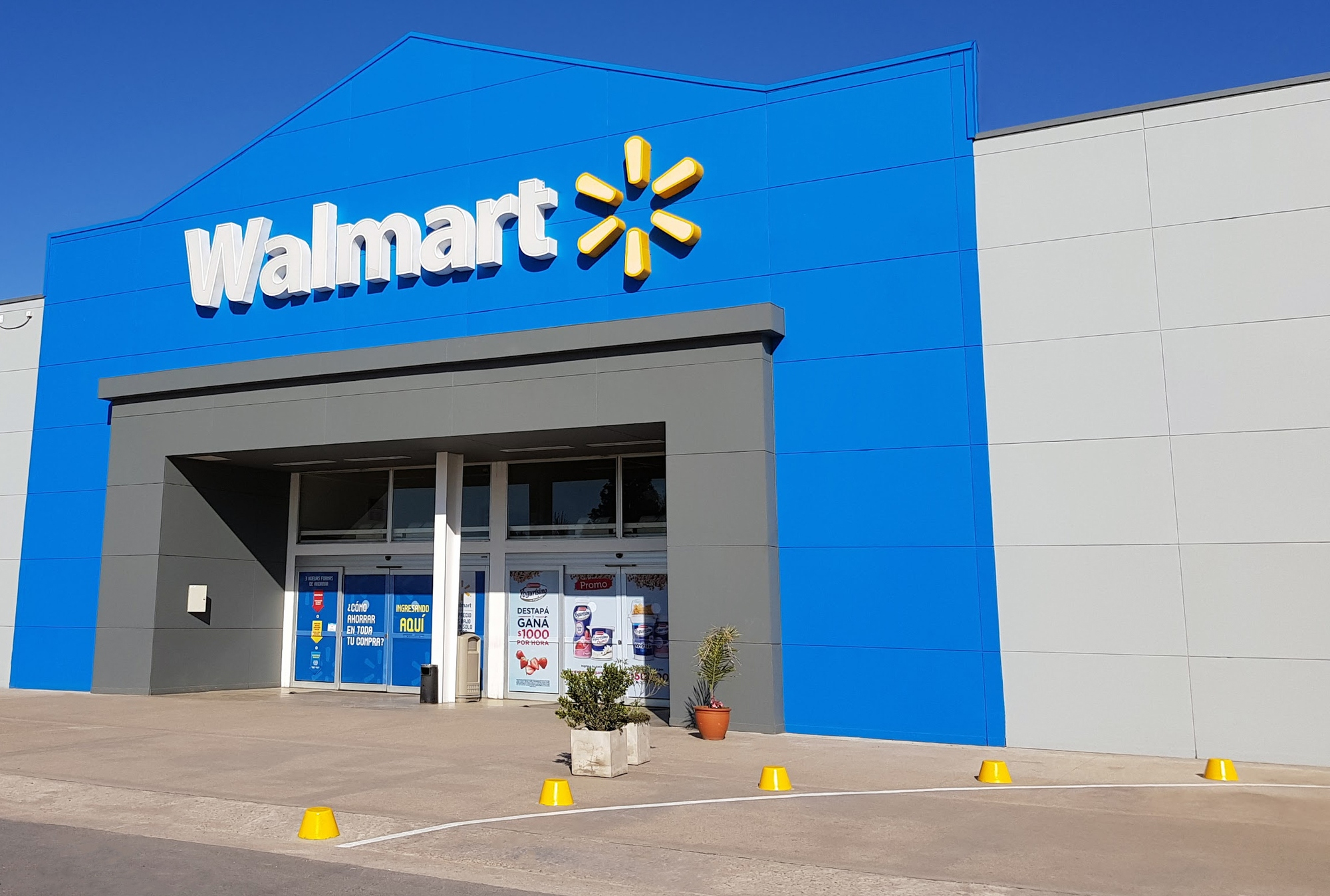
A Walmart Supercenter in Argentina in February 2019

Walmart Argentina was founded in 1995 and operates stores under the banners Walmart Supercenter, Changomas, Mi Changomas, and Punto Mayorista. On November 6, 2020, it was announced that Walmart has sold its Argentine operations to Grupo de Narváez and renamed Hiper Changomas.

==== United Kingdom ====
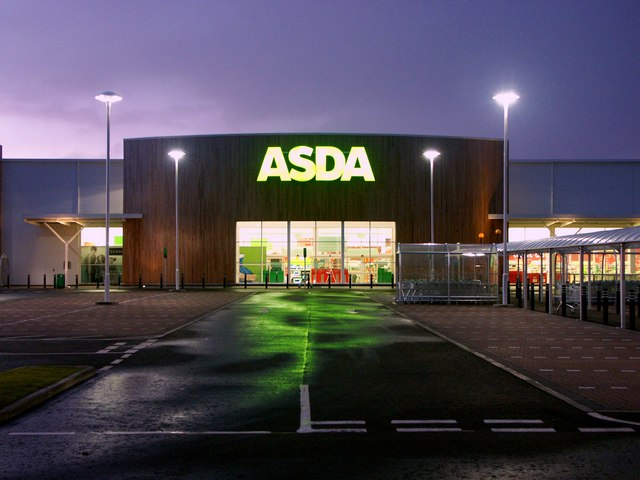
ASDA Supermarket in Fife, Scotland

Walmart's UK subsidiary Asda (which retained its name after being acquired by Walmart) is based in Leeds and accounted for 42.7% of 2006 sales of Walmart's international division. In contrast to the U.S. operations, Asda was originally and still remains primarily a grocery chain, but with a stronger focus on non-food items than most UK supermarket chains other than Tesco. In 2010 Asda acquired stores from Netto UK. In addition to small suburban Asda Supermarkets, larger stores are branded Supercentres. Other banners include Asda Superstores, Asda Living, and Asda Petrol Fueling Station. In July 2015, Asda updated its logo featuring the Walmart Asterisks behind the first 'A' in the Logo. In May 2018, Walmart announced plans to sell Asda to rival Sainsbury's for $10.1 billion. Under the terms of the deal, Walmart would have received a 42% stake in the combined company and about £3 billion in cash. However, in April 2019, the United Kingdom's Competition and Markets Authority blocked the proposed sale of Asda to Sainsburys.

On October 2, 2020, it was announced that Walmart would sell a majority stake of Asda to a consortium of Zuber and Mohsin Issa (the owners of EG Group) and private equity firm TDR Capital for £6.8bn, pending approval from the Competition and Markets Authority. The sale was approved in February 2021.

==== Japan ====
In Japan, Walmart owned 100% of Seiyu (西友 Seiyū) as of 2008. It operates under the Seiyu (Hypermarket), Seiyu (Supermarket), Seiyu (General Merchandise), Livin, and Sunny banners. On November 16, 2020, Walmart announced they would be selling 65% of their shares in the company to the private-equity firm KKR in a deal valuing 329 stores and 34,600 employees at $1.6 billion. Walmart is supposed to retain 15% and a seat on the board, while a joint-venture between KKR and Japanese company Rakuten Inc. will receive 20%.

==== Corruption charges ====
An April 2012 investigation by The New York Times reported allegations that, in September 2005, the company had paid bribes to officials throughout Mexico in exchange for construction permits, information, and other favors, which gave Walmart a substantial advantage over competitors. Walmart investigators found evidence that Mexican and American laws had been broken. Concerns were also raised that Walmart executives in the United States had "hushed up" the allegations. A follow-up investigation by The New York Times, published December 17, 2012, revealed evidence that regulatory permission for siting, construction, and operation of 19 stores had been obtained through bribery. Walmart released a statement denying the allegations and describing its anti-corruption policy. While an official Walmart report stated that it had found no evidence of corruption, the article alleges that previous internal reports had indeed turned up such evidence before the story became public.

In 2012, an incident with CJ's Seafood, a crawfish processing firm in Louisiana that was partnered with Walmart, gained media attention for the mistreatment of its 40 H-2B visa workers from Mexico. After workers confronted management at CJ's Seafood, who denied the abuse allegations, the visa workers held a protest and day-long hunger strike in June 2012 .Walmart announced its decision to no longer work with CJ's Seafood. Less than a month later, the Department of Labor fined CJ's Seafood "approximately $460,000 in back-pay, safety violations, wage and hour violations, civil damages, and fines for abuses to the H-2B program. The company has since shut down."

In December 2012, Walmart invested $99 million on internal investigations into possible violations of the Foreign Corrupt Practices Act, which expanded beyond Mexico to implicate operations in China, Brazil, and India. In June 2019, Walmart Inc. and its wholly owned Brazil-based subsidiary, WMT Brasilia, agreed to pay $137 million to resolve the case.

=== Sam's Club ===
Sam's Club is a chain of warehouse clubs that sell groceries and general merchandise, often in bulk. Locations generally range in size from 32,000–168,000 sq ft (3,000–15,600 m^{2}), with an average club size of approximately 134,000 sq ft (12,400 m^{2}). The first Sam's Club was opened by Walmart, Inc. in 1983 in Midwest City, Oklahoma under the name "Sam's Wholesale Club". The chain was named after its founder Sam Walton. As of October 31, 2022, Sam's Club operated 600 membership warehouse clubs and accounted for 11.3% of Walmart's revenue at $57.839 billion in fiscal year 2019. Christopher Nicholas is the president and CEO of Sam's Club.

=== Global eCommerce ===
Based in San Bruno, California, Walmart's Global eCommerce division provides online retailing for Walmart, Sam's Club, and all other international brands. There are several U.S. locations in California and Oregon: San Bruno, Sunnyvale, Brisbane, and Portland. Locations outside of the United States include Shanghai (China), Leeds (United Kingdom), and Bangalore (India).

== Subsidiaries ==
=== Private label brands ===
About 40 percent of products sold in Walmart are private labels, which are produced for the company through contracts with manufacturers. Walmart began offering private label brands in 1991, with the launch of Sam's Choice, a line of drinks produced by Primo Water for Walmart. Sam's Choice quickly became popular and by 1993, was the third-most-popular beverage brand in the United States. Other Walmart brands include Great Value and Equate in the U.S. and Canada and Smart Price in Britain. A 2006 study talked of "the magnitude of mind-share Walmart appears to hold in the shoppers' minds when it comes to the awareness of private label brands and retailers".

=== Entertainment ===
In 2010, the company teamed with Procter & Gamble to produce Secrets of the Mountain and The Jensen Project, two-hour family movies which featured the characters using Walmart and Procter & Gamble–branded products. The Jensen Project also featured a preview of a product to be released in several months in Walmart stores. A third movie, A Walk in My Shoes, also aired in 2010 and a fourth is in production. Walmart's director of brand marketing also serves as co-chair of the Association of National Advertisers's Alliance for Family Entertainment.

== Online commerce acquisitions and plans ==
Launched in 2009, Walmart's Marketplace stayed dormant until 2016 when Walmart purchased e-commerce company Jet.com, founded in 2014 by Marc Lore, to start competing with Amazon.com. Jet.com has acquired its own share of online retailers such as Hayneedle in March 2016, Shoebuy.com in December 2016, and ModCloth in March 2017. Walmart also acquired Parcel, a delivery service in New York, on September 29, 2017.

On February 15, 2017, Walmart acquired Moosejaw, an online active outdoor retailer, for approximately $51 million. Moosejaw brought with it partnerships with more than 400 brands, including Patagonia, The North Face, Marmot, and Arc'teryx.

Marc Lore, Walmart's U.S. e-commerce CEO, said that Walmart's existing physical infrastructure of almost 5,000 stores around the U.S. will enhance its digital expansion by doubling as warehouses for e-commerce without increasing overhead. As of 2017, Walmart offers in-store pickup for online orders at 1,000 stores with plans to eventually expand the service to all of its stores.

On May 9, 2018, Walmart announced its intent to acquire a 77% controlling stake in the Indian e-commerce website Flipkart for $16 billion (beating bids by Amazon.com), subject to regulatory approval. Following its completion, the website's management will report to Marc Lore. Completion of the deal was announced on August 18, 2018.

The company's partnership with subscription service Kidbox was announced on April 16, 2019.

On May 19, 2020, Walmart announced that it was shutting down Jet.com, with all subsequent visitors to the site directed to the Walmart website instead.

== Corporate affairs ==
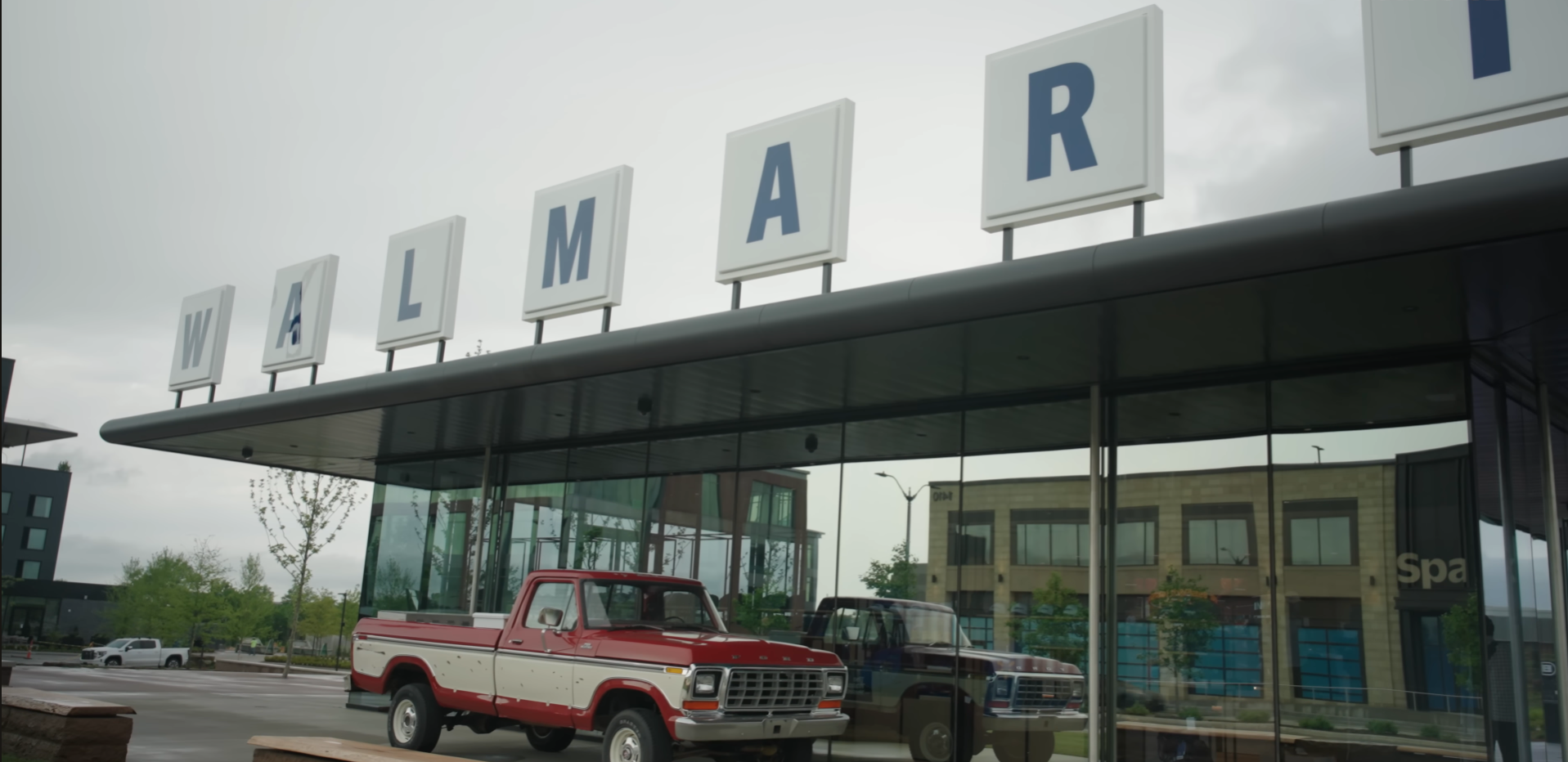
The new Walmart Home Office HQ Welcome Center at Bentonville, Arkansas in 2026.

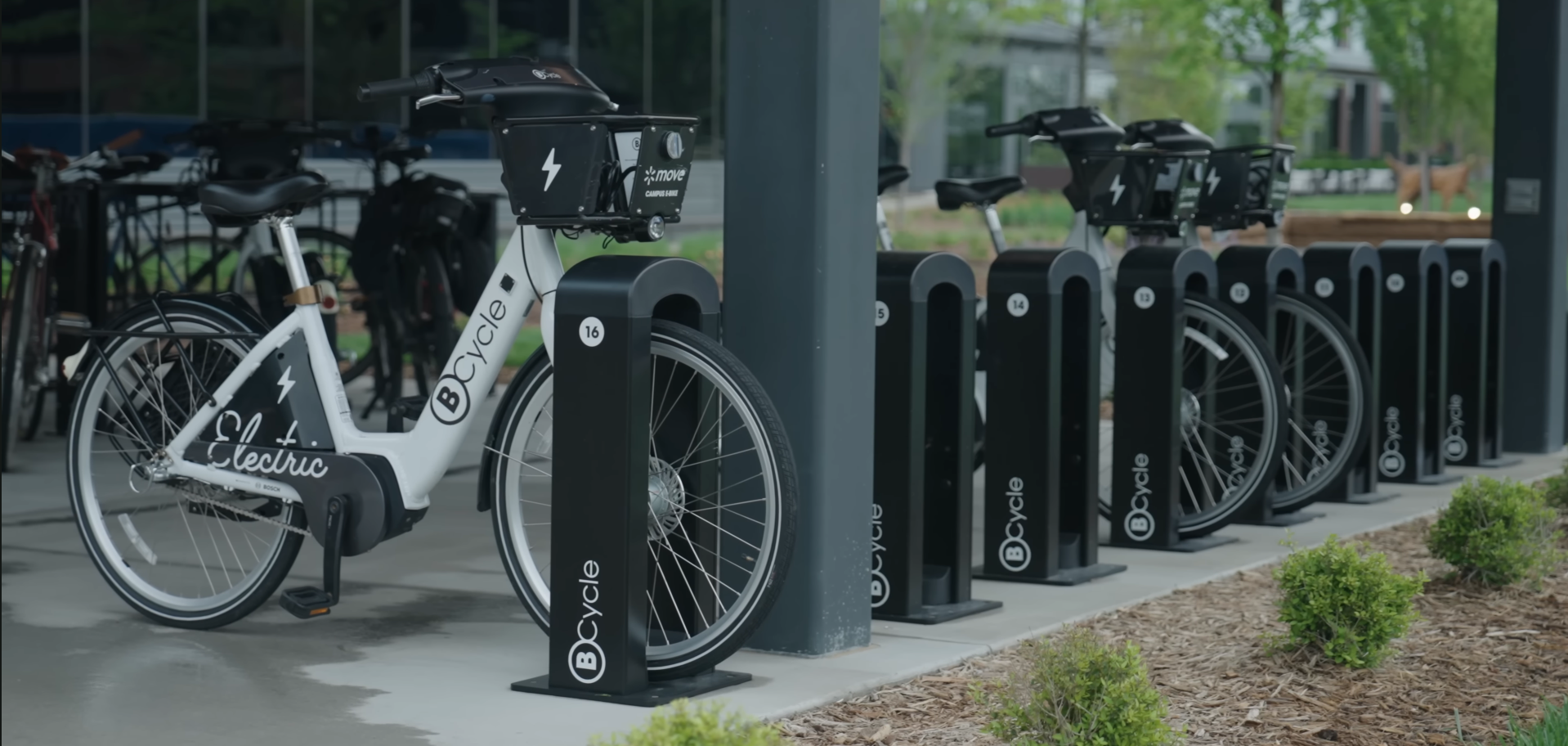
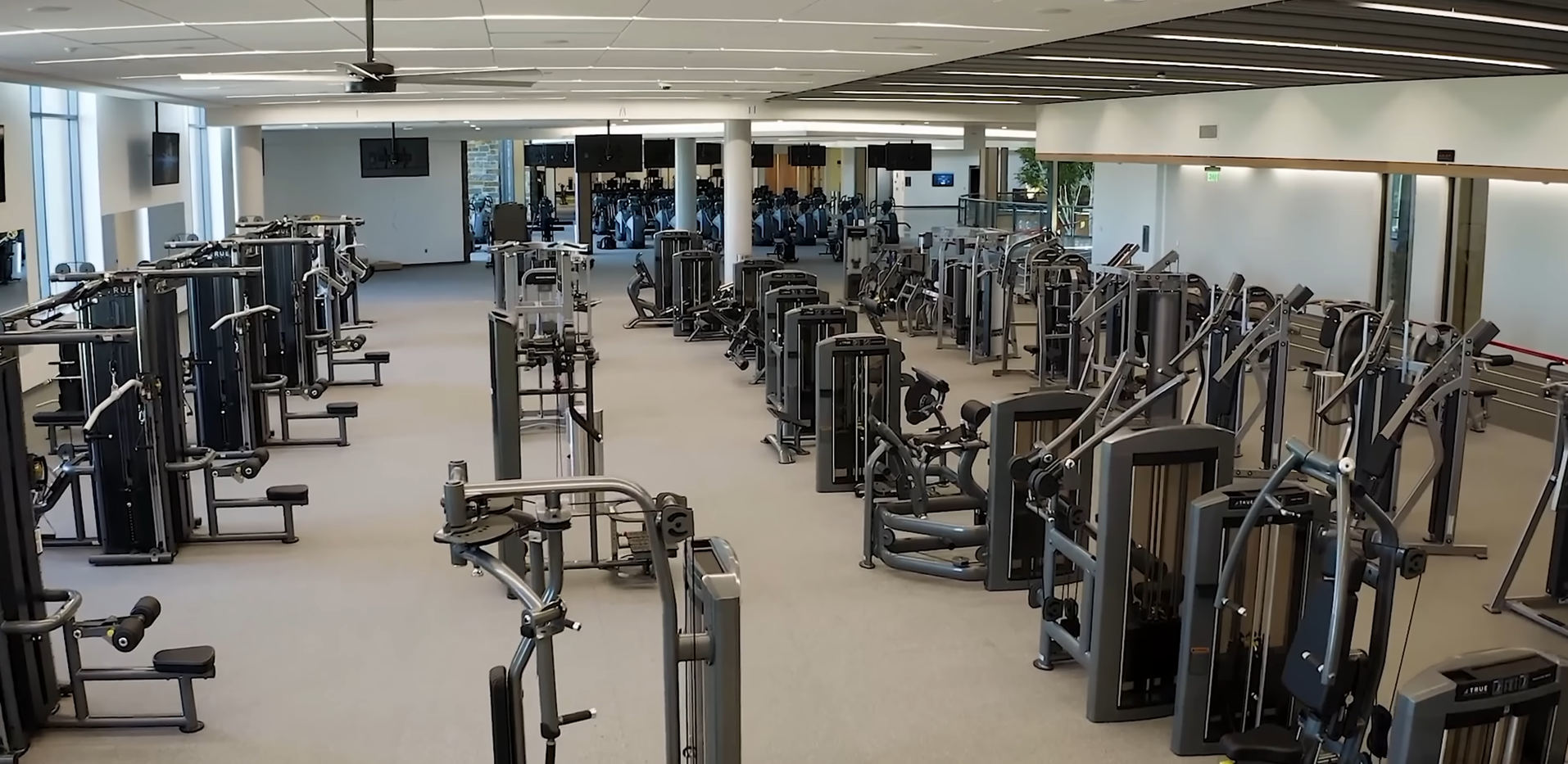
Electric bicycle and stands and new 360,000-square-foot fitness center for employees at Walmart HQ New Home Office at Bentonville, Arkansas.

Walmart is headquartered in the Walmart Home Office complex in Bentonville, Arkansas. In 2025, Walmart closed several U.S. offices and consolidated its U.S. corporate associates into its Bentonville headquarters or its West Coast offices in Sunnyvale, California. In 2025, the company opened a new, 350-acre "Home Office" campus in Bentonville, which is home to 15,000 employees in 2.4 million square feet of office space.

The company's business model is based on selling a wide variety of general merchandise at low prices. Doug McMillon became Walmart's CEO on February 1, 2014. He has also worked as the head of Sam's Club and Walmart International. The company refers to its employees as "associates". All Walmart stores in the U.S. and Canada also have designated "greeters" at the entrance, a practice pioneered by Sam Walton and later imitated by other retailers. Greeters are trained to help shoppers find what they want and answer their questions.

For many years, associates were identified in the store by their signature blue vest, but this practice was discontinued in June 2007 and replaced with khaki pants and polo shirts. The wardrobe change was part of a larger corporate overhaul to increase sales and rejuvenate the company's stock price. In September 2014, the uniform was again updated to bring back a vest (paid for by the company) for store employees over the same polos and khaki or black pants paid for by the employee. The vest is navy blue for Walmart employees at Supercenters and discounts stores, lime green for Walmart Neighborhood Market employees, and yellow for self-check-out associates; door greeters, and customer service managers. All three state "Proud Walmart Associate" on the left breast and the "Spark" logo covering the back. Reportedly one of the main reasons the vest was reintroduced was that some customers had trouble identifying employees. In 2016, self-checkout associates, door greeters and customer service managers began wearing a yellow vest to be better seen by customers. By requiring employees to wear uniforms that are made up of standard "streetwear", Walmart is not required to purchase the uniforms or reimburse employees which are required in some states, as long as that clothing can be worn elsewhere. Businesses are only legally required to pay for branded shirts and pants or clothes that would be difficult to wear outside of work.

Unlike many other retailers, Walmart does not charge slotting fees to suppliers for their products to appear in the store. Instead, it focuses on selling more-popular products and provides incentives for store managers to drop unpopular products.

From 2006 to 2010, the company eliminated its layaway program. In 2011, the company revived its layaway program.

Walmart introduced its Site-To-Store program in 2007, after testing the program since 2004 on a limited basis. The program allows walmart.com customers to buy goods online with a free shipping option, and have goods shipped to the nearest store for pickup.

On September 15, 2017, Walmart announced that it would build a new headquarters in Bentonville to replace its current 1971 building and consolidate operations that have spread out to 20 different buildings throughout Bentonville.

According to watchdog group Documented, in 2020 Walmart contributed $140,000 to the Rule of Law Defense Fund, a fund-raising arm of the Republican Attorneys General Association.

=== Business trends ===
For the fiscal year ending January 31, 2019, Walmart reported net income of US$6.6 billion on $514 billion of revenue. The company's international operations accounted for $120 billion, or 23.7 percent, of its $510 billion of sales. Walmart is the world's 23rd-largest public corporation, according to the Forbes Global 2000 list, and the largest public corporation when ranked by revenue.

The key trends for Walmart are (as of the financial year ending January 31):

Business figures 1968 – 2014
Year	Revenue (Note: "Total revenues")	Net Income (Note: "Consolidated net income attributable to Walmart")	Total Assets	Employees	Stores (Note: "total retail units")	Sources
Year	US$ millions			Employees	Stores	Sources
1968	12.6	0.48			24	
1969	21.3	0.60			27	
1970	30.8	1.1		1,000	32	
1971	44.2	1.6	15.3	1,500	38	
1972	78.0	2.9	28.4	2,300	51	
1973	124	4.5	46.2	3,500	66	
1974	167	6.1	60.1	4,400	78	
1975	236	6.3	75.2	5,800	104	
1976	340	11.5	125	7,500	125	
1977	478	16.5	168	10,000	153	
1978	678	21.8	251	14,700	195	
1979	900	29.4	324	17,500	229	
1980	1,248	41.1	457	21,000	276	
1981	1,643	55.6	592	27,000	330	
1982	2,444	82.7	937	41,000	491	
1983	3,376	124	1,187	46,000	551	
1984	4,666	196	1,652	62,000	645	
1985	6,400	270	2,205	81,000	758	
1986	8,451	327	3,103	104,000	887	
1987	11,909	450	4,049	141,000	1,037	
1988	15,959	627	5,131	183,000	1,215	
1989	20,649	837	6,359	223,000	1,381	
	US$ billions					
1990	25.8	1.0	8.1	275,000	1,528	
1991	32.6	1.2	11.3	328,000	1,725	
1992	43.8	1.6	15.4	371,000	1,930	
1993	55.4	1.9	20.5	434,000	2,136	
1994	67.3	2.3	26.4	528,000	2,463	
1995	82.4	2.6	32.8	622,000	2,872	
1996	93.6	2.7	37.5	675,000	3,106	
1997	104	3.0	39.6	728,000	3,117	
1998	117	3.5	45.3	825,000	3,406	
1999	137	4.4	49.9	910,000	3,600	
2000	165	5.3	70.3	1,140,000	3,662	
2001	191	6.2	78.1	1,244,000	4,189	
2002	204	6.5	81.5	1,383,000	4,414	
2003	229	7.9	92.9	1,400,000	4,688	
2004	256	9.0	104	1,500,000	4,906	
2005	284	10.2	120	1,700,000	5,289	
2006	312	11.2	138	1,800,000	6,141	
2007	348	11.2	151	1,900,000	6,779	
2008	377	12.7	163	2,100,000	7,262	
2009	404	13.3	163	2,100,000	7,870	
2010	408	14.3	170	2,100,000	8,416	
2011	421	16.3	180	2,100,000	8,970	
2012	446	15.6	193	2,200,000	10,130	
2013	468	16.9	203	2,200,000	10,773	
2014	476	16.0	204	2,200,000	10,942	

Business figures from 2015
Year	Revenue (Note: "Total revenues")	Net Income (Note: "Consolidated net income attributable to Walmart")	Total Assets	Employees	Stores (Note: "total retail units")	Sources
Year	US$ billions			Employees	Stores	Sources
2015	485	16.3	203	2,200,000	11,453	
2016	482	14.6	199	2,300,000	11,528	
2017	485	13.6	198	2,300,000	11,695	
2018	500	9.8	204	2,300,000	11,718	
2019	514	6.6	219	2,200,000	11,361	
2020	523	14.8	236	2,200,000	11,501	
2021	559	13.5	252	2,300,000	11,443	
2022	572	13.6	244	2,300,000	10,593	
2023	611	11.6	243	2,100,000	10,623	
2024	648	15.5	252	2,100,000	10,616	
2025	674	19.4	260	2,100,000	10,771	

=== Governance ===
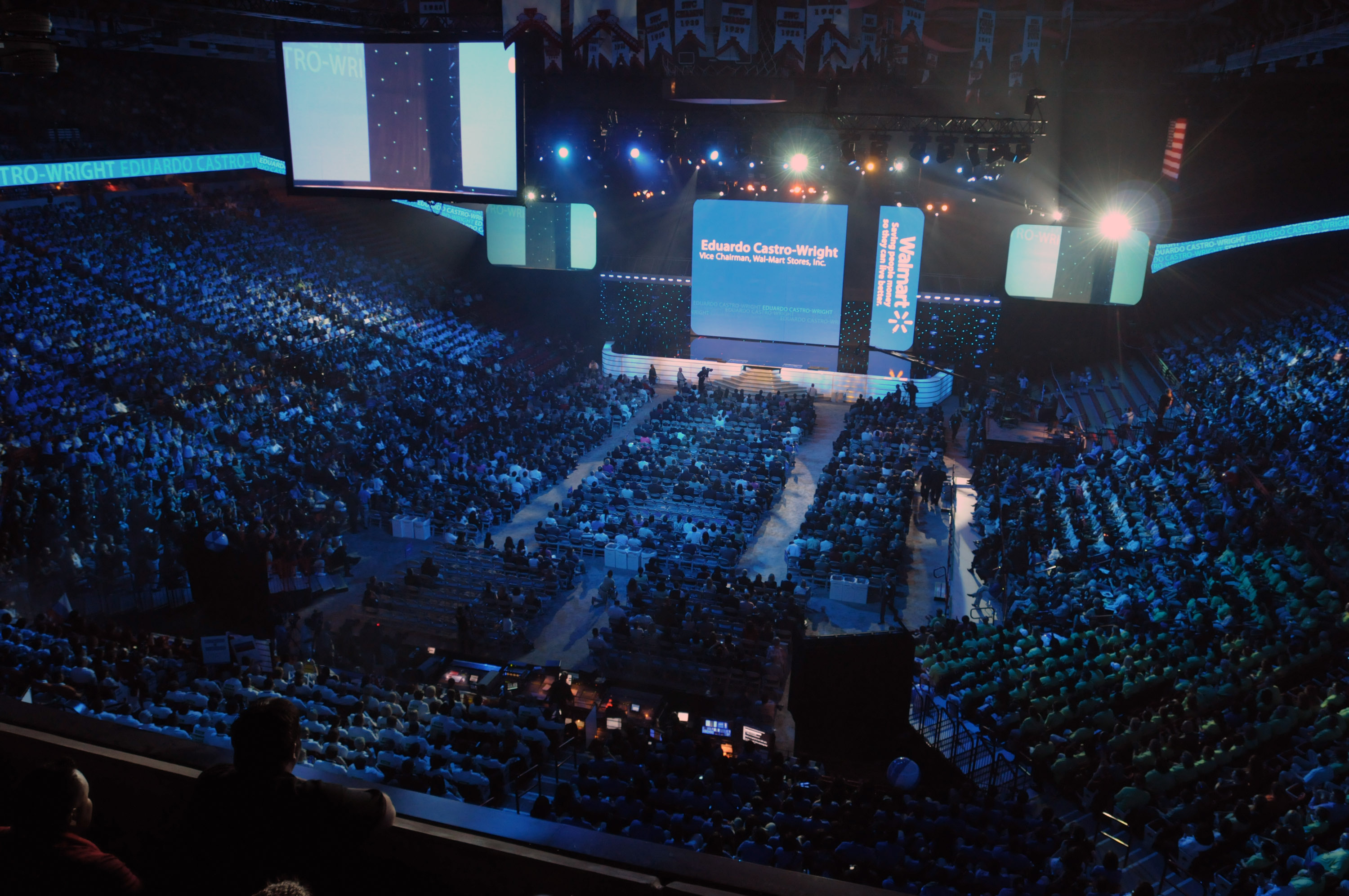
Walmart Shareholders' Meeting

Walmart is governed by an eleven-member board of directors elected annually by shareholders. Gregory B. Penner, son-in-law of S. Robson Walton and the grandson-in-law of Sam Walton, serves as chairman of the board. John Furner serves as president and chief executive officer.

Current members of the board are:

- Gregory B. Penner, chairman of the board of directors of Walmart Inc. and general partner of Madrone Capital Partners
- Cesar Conde, chairman of NBCUniversal International Group and NBCUniversal Telemundo Enterprises
- Timothy P. Flynn, retired CEO of KPMG International
- Sarah Friar, CFO of OpenAI
- Carla A. Harris, Vice-chairman of Wealth Management, head of multicultural client strategy, managing director, and senior client advisor at Morgan Stanley
- Tom Horton, senior advisor at Warburg Pincus, LLC, and retired chairman and CEO of American Airlines
- Marissa A. Mayer, co-founder of Lumi Labs, Inc., and former president and CEO of Yahoo!, Inc.
- Doug McMillon, former president and CEO of Walmart
- Bob Moritz, retired chairman of PricewaterhouseCoopers
- Brian Niccol, chairman and CEO of Starbucks
- Randall Stephenson, retired chairman and CEO of AT&T Inc.
- S. Robson "Rob" Walton, retired chairman of the board of directors of Walmart Inc.
- Steuart Walton, founder of RZC Investments, LLC.

Notable former members of the board include Hillary Clinton (1985–1992) and Tom Coughlin (2003–2004), the latter having served as vice chairman. Clinton left the board before the 1992 U.S. presidential election, and Coughlin left in December 2005 after pleading guilty to wire fraud and tax evasion for stealing hundreds of thousands of dollars from Walmart.

After Sam Walton's death in 1992, Don Soderquist, Chief Operating Officer and Senior Vice Chairman, became known as the "Keeper of the Culture".

=== Ownership ===
Walmart Inc. is a Delaware-domiciled joint-stock company registered with the U.S. Securities and Exchange Commission, with its registered office located in Wolters Kluwer's Corporation Trust Center in Wilmington. As of March 2017, it has 3,292,377,090 outstanding shares. These are held mainly by the Walton family, a number of institutions and funds.

- 43.00% (1,415,891,131): Walton Enterprises LLC
- 5.30% (174,563,205): Walton family Holdings Trust
- 3.32% (102,036,399): The Vanguard Group, Inc
- 2.37% (72,714,226): State Street Corporation
- 1.37% (42,171,892): BlackRock Institutional Trust Company
- 0.94% (28,831,721): Vanguard Total Stock Market Index Fund
- 0.77% (23,614,578): BlackRock Fund Advisors
- 0.71% (21,769,126): Dodge & Cox Inc
- 0.68% (20,978,727): Vanguard 500 Index Fund
- 0.65% (20,125,838): Bank of America Corporation
- 0.57% (17,571,058): Bank of New York Mellon Corporation
- 0.57% (17,556,128): Northern Trust Corporation
- 0.55% (16,818,165): Vanguard Institutional Index Fund-Institutional Index Fund
- 0.55% (16,800,850): State Farm Mutual Automobile Insurance Co
- 0.52% (15,989,827): SPDR S&P 500 ETF Trust

=== Competition ===
In North America, Walmart's primary competitors include grocery stores and department stores like Target, Kroger and its Harris Teeter subsidiary, Aldi, Meijer, Trader Joe's, Ingles, Publix, and Winn-Dixie in the United States; Loblaw retail stores, Sobeys, Metro, and Giant Tiger in Canada; and Comercial Mexicana and Soriana in Mexico. Competitors of Walmart's Sam's Club division are Costco and the smaller BJ's Wholesale Club chain. Walmart's move into the grocery business in the late 1990s set it against major supermarket chains in both the United States and Canada. Studies have typically found that Walmart's prices are significantly lower than those of their competitors, and that Walmart's presence is associated with lower food prices for households. Comparisons of performance metrics such as sales per square foot suggest that supermarkets in direct competition with Walmart Supercenters show significant decreases in profit margins, an effect that is strongest in the case of unionized competitors. Between 2000 and 2010, Walmart's entry into new areas often lowered local food prices at other stores. However, recent studies have not found the same effect, suggesting that retailers may have changed their competitive strategies.

While the idea that Walmart destroys small businesses is widely assumed to be true, research so far suggests that Walmart superstores have little effect on smaller retailers such as "Mom and Pop" businesses. Differences in impact appear to be specific to the goods sold. Small retailers may experience difficulty if they rely on selling products identical to those at Walmart or if they try to sell at lower prices. Dollar stores such as Family Dollar and Dollar General have been able to find a small niche market and compete successfully against Walmart. In 2004, Walmart responded by testing its own dollar store concept, a subsection of some stores called "Pennies-n-Cents".

Walmart also had to face fierce competition in some foreign markets. For example, in Germany it had captured just 2 percent of the German food market following its entry into the market in 1997 and remained "a secondary player" behind Aldi with 19 percent.

In May 2006, after entering the South Korean market in 1998, Walmart sold all 16 of its South Korean outlets to Shinsegae, a local retailer, for US$882 million. Shinsegae re-branded the Walmarts as E-mart stores.

Walmart struggled to export its brand elsewhere as it rigidly tried to reproduce its model overseas. In China, Walmart hopes to succeed by adapting and doing things preferable to Chinese citizens. For example, it found that Chinese consumers preferred to select their own live fish and seafood; stores began displaying the meat uncovered and installed fish tanks, leading to higher sales.

=== Customer base ===
Map of Walmart locations in the United States, as of January 2025.

In the United States, Walmart's early growth occurred in the Southeast and lower Midwest. More recently, Walmart has expanded throughout the country. The number of Walmart stores per 1,000 people in 2019 was highest in Arkansas, Oklahoma, Louisiana, Alabama and Kansas, and lowest in Hawaii, California, New Jersey, Massachusetts and New York. California and New Jersey were two of the ten states with the largest increases in Supercenters between 2011 and 2020, along with Pennsylvania, Illinois, and Wisconsin.

Walmart customers display strong customer loyalty and cite low prices as the most important reason for shopping there. Walmart has characterized their shoppers as falling into three main groups: "value-price shoppers" (people who like low prices and cannot afford much more), "brand aspirationals" (people with low incomes who buy well-known brands in hopes of assuring quality), and "price-sensitive affluents" (wealthier shoppers who seek deals). As of 2022 the average U.S. Walmart customer earned about $80,000 per year, above the U.S. average personal income of $63,214. Walmart reports that during times of rising inflation, customers become more sensitive to rising food prices, buying less expensive food items such as hot dogs and canned tuna rather than deli cold cuts. They also see more upper-income shoppers looking for bargains.

Walmart shoppers have been reported to be politically conservative. A poll after the 2004 U.S. presidential election reported that 76 percent of voters who shopped at Walmart once a week reported voting for George W. Bush while only 23 percent supported senator John Kerry. When measured against similar retailers in the U.S. in 2006, frequent Walmart shoppers were rated the most politically conservative. As of 2014 54 percent of Americans who preferred to shop at Walmart reported that they opposed same-sex marriage, while 40 percent were in favor, reflecting the store's southern roots.

Due to its concentration of stores in the Bible Belt, Walmart is known for its "tradition of tailoring its service to churchgoing customers". Walmart has carried clean versions of hip-hop audio CDs and in cooperation with The Timothy Plan, placed "plastic sheathes over suggestive women's periodicals and banned 'lad mags' such as Maxim" magazine. Walmart also caters to its Christian customer base by selling Christian books and media, such as VeggieTales videos and The Purpose-Driven Life, earning the company over US$1 billion annually.

In 2006, Walmart took steps to expand its U.S. customer base, announcing a modification in its U.S. stores from a "one-size-fits-all" merchandising strategy to one designed to "reflect each of six demographic groups—African-Americans, the affluent, empty-nesters, Hispanics, suburbanites, and rural residents". Around six months later, it unveiled a new slogan: "Saving people money so they can live better lives".

Walmart has also made steps to appeal to more liberal customers, for example, by rejecting the American Family Association's recommendations and carrying the DVD Brokeback Mountain, a love story between two gay cowboys in Wyoming.

=== Sales of guns and ammunition ===
Walmart stopped selling handguns in all U.S. states, except Alaska, in 1993.

In 2018, Walmart stopped selling guns and ammunition to persons younger than 21, following a similar move by Dick's Sporting Goods. That same year, Walmart stopped selling military-style rifles that were commonly used in mass shootings.

As of 2019, Walmart was a major retailer of firearms and ammunition. In 2019, after 23 people were killed in a mass shooting at a Walmart store in El Paso, Texas, Walmart announced that it would stop selling all handgun ammunition and certain short-barreled rifle ammunition. The company also announced that it would stop selling handguns in Alaska, the only state where the company still sold handguns. The move was expected to reduce Walmart's U.S. market share in ammunition from around 20% to around 6–9%. Walmart also stated that it was "respectfully requesting" that customers not openly carry weapons in Walmart stores, except for authorized law enforcement officers.

Following the fatal police shooting of Walter Wallace Jr. in October 2020, Walmart temporarily removed gun and ammunition displays in thousands of stores across the U.S., grounding their reason in concerns of civil unrest. Firearms and ammunition were still available for purchase on request.

== Technology ==
Walmart Global Tech is the technology arm of Walmart Inc and functions as a large-scale engineering and business services organization that powers the company's global retail operations. This division is led by Global Chief Technology Officer (CTO), and Chief Development Officer of Walmart Inc..

=== Artificial intelligence (AI) partnership ===
In October 2025, it was announced that Walmart would be partnering with OpenAI, which would let U.S.-based shoppers buy Walmart products (excluding food) directly through ChatGPT, OpenAI's chatbot.

In January 2026, Walmart announced a partnership with Gemini that would allow users to discover products and complete purchases from Walmart within Gemini conversations.

=== Open source software ===
Many Walmart technology projects are coded in the open and available through the Walmart Labs GitHub repository as open-source software under the OSI approved Apache V2.0 license. As of November 2016, 141 public GitHub projects are listed.

During a migration of the walmart.com retail platform to Facebook React and Node.js, the Electrode project was created to power the e-commerce platform which serves 80 million visitors per month and 15 million items.

Alex Grigoryan of Walmart Labs released a statement on Medium.com on October 3, 2016, explaining the details of the applications and the scale that they operate at Walmart.

=== Big data analytics ===
As the largest retailer in the U.S., Walmart collects and analyzes a large amount of consumer data. The big data sets are mined for use in predictive analytics, which allow the company to optimize operations by predicting customer's habits. Walmart's datacenter is unofficially referred to as Area 71.

In April 2011, Walmart acquired Kosmix to develop software for analyzing real-time data streams. In August 2012, Walmart announced its Polaris search engine.

The amount of data gathered by Walmart has raised privacy concerns.

=== Cash handling ===
In 2016, Walmart began a drive to automate much of the cash handling process. Walmart began replacing employees who count currency by hand with machines that count 8 bills per second and 3,000 coins a minute. The processing machines, located in the back of stores, allow cashiers to process the money for electronic depositing.

=== Robots ===
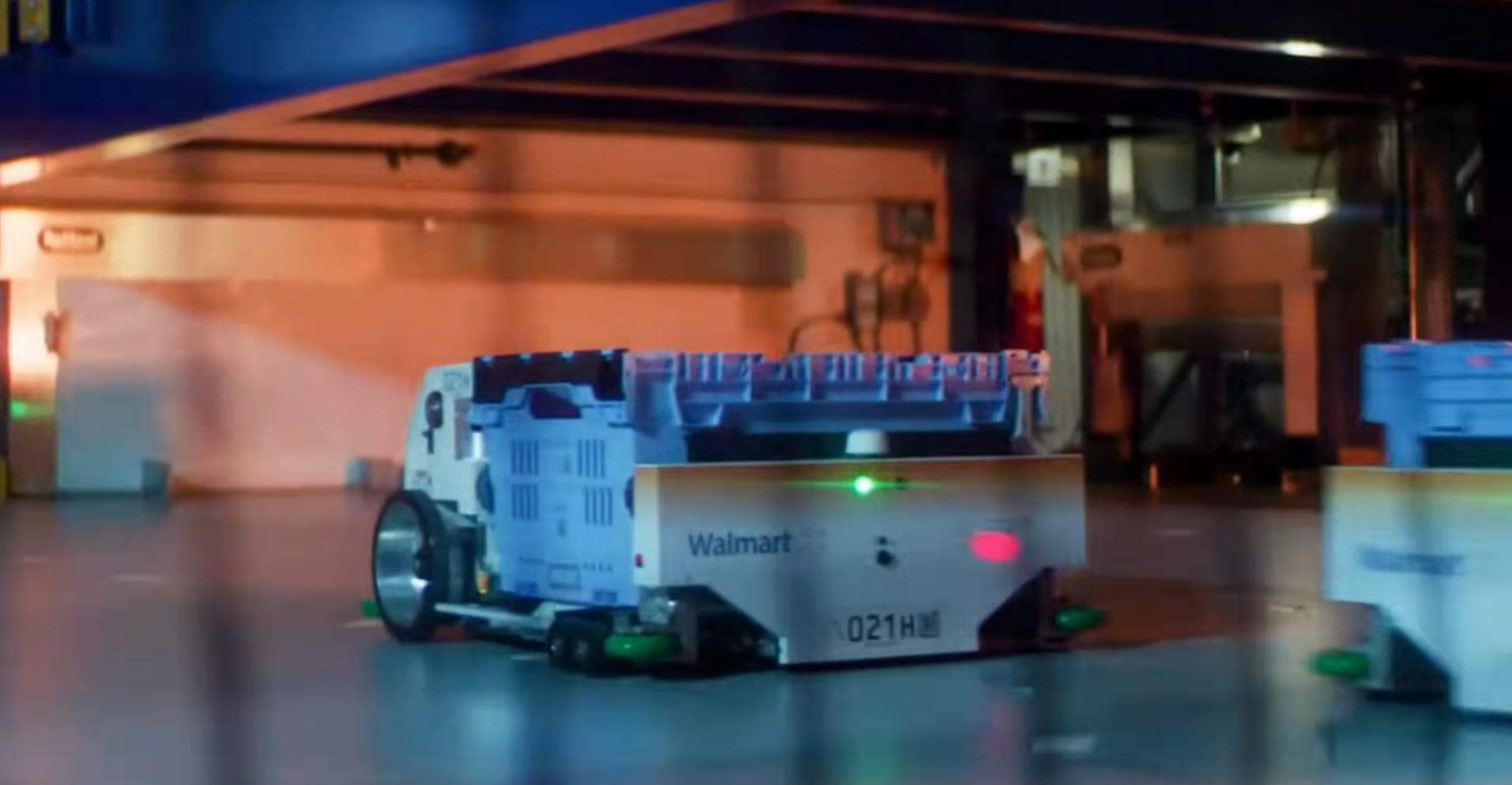
Walmart robotics

Walmart Advanced Systems and Robotics division is the Boston, Massachusetts based engineering and technology hub of Walmart. Alert Innovation, a specialized robotics startup initially founded to revolutionize retail automation, was officially acquired by Walmart after a successful technological partnership. Following its official acquisition by Walmart in late 2022, the entity was rebranded to serve as the retailer's premier in-house automation lab. This transition allowed the hub to rapidly scale its engineering talent pool. Walmart dedicated the division's engineering power exclusively to its own supply chain, utilizing the tech to successfully launch new Market Fulfillment Centers in Arkansas and aggressively scale store-level micro-fulfillment capabilities across its massive nationwide retail footprint.

In April 2019, Walmart Inc. announced plans to extend the use of robots in stores to improve and monitor inventory, clean floors and unload trucks, part of the company's effort to lower its labor costs. The use of robots has alienated some workers.

In 2020, Walmart expanded its use of robotics and artificial intelligence for "repeatable and predictable" tasks including scanning shelves for out of stock items, by introducing the technology into an additional 650 Walmart locations in 2020 as part of a partnership with Bossa Nova Robotics and NCR corporation. Later that year, the company ended its contract Bossa Nova Robotics with which it joined over the past five years to gradually add six-foot-tall inventory-scanning machines to stores.

In 2025, Symbotic Inc. announced it has agreed to acquire the Advanced Systems and Robotics business from Walmart. Symbotic will build and develop an AI-enabled robotics platform to automate accelerated pickup and delivery centers. Walmart will invest $520 million to fund the development program and purchase and deploy 400 Accelerated Pickup and Delivery centers from Symbotic over a multi-year period.

== Charity ==
Sam Walton believed that the company's contribution to society was that it operated efficiently, thereby lowering the cost of living for customers, and, therefore, in that sense was a "powerful force for good", despite his refusal to contribute cash to philanthropic causes. Having begun to feel that his wealth attracted people who wanted nothing more than a "handout", he explained that while he believed his family had been fortunate and wished to use his wealth to aid worthy causes like education, it could not be expected to "solve every personal problem that comes to [their] attention". He explained later in his autobiography, "We feel very strongly that Wal-Mart really is not, and should not be, in the charity business," stating "any debit has to be passed along to somebody—either shareholders or our customers." Since Sam Walton's death in 1992, however, Walmart and the Walmart Foundation dramatically increased charitable giving. For example, in 2005, Walmart donated US$20 million in cash and merchandise for Hurricane Katrina relief and in 2020 it committed $25 million to organizations on the frontlines of the COVID-19 pandemic response. Today, Walmart's charitable donations approach US$1 billion each year.

=== COVID-19 ===
As of January 2021, healthcare workers could get vaccines through Walmart in New Mexico and Arkansas. Walmart planned to offer vaccines in Georgia, Indiana, Louisiana, Maryland, New Jersey, South Carolina, Texas, Chicago and Puerto Rico with the target of delivering between 10 million and 13 million doses per month at full capacity.

In May 2021, Walmart said that starting from May 18 all its fully vaccinated employees could stop wearing masks at work following the guidance from the U.S. Centers for Disease Control and Prevention.

== Economic impact ==
=== Effects on customers ===
A 2005 story in The Washington Post reported that "Wal-Mart's discounting on food alone boosts the welfare of American shoppers by at least US$50 billion per year." A study in 2005 at the Massachusetts Institute of Technology (MIT) measured the effect on consumer welfare and found that the poorest segment of the population benefits the most from the existence of discount retailers. In 2006, American newspaper columnist George Will stated that In terms of economic effects, "Wal-Mart and its effects save shoppers more than US$200 billion a year, dwarfing such government programs as food stamps (US$28.6 billion) and the earned income tax credit (US$34.6 billion)".

=== Effects on retailers ===
Kenneth Stone, Professor of Economics at Iowa State University, in a paper published in Farm Foundation (1997), found that some small towns can lose almost half of their retail trade within ten years of a Walmart store opening. Presumably, people who previously shopped in towns without Wal-Mart stores choose to shop in towns with Wal-Mart stores, part of an older pattern in which smaller centers lose retail sales to larger ones. Stone compared the changes to previous competitors that small town shops have faced in the past, such as the development of the railroads, the Sears Roebuck catalog, and shopping malls. He concluded that small towns are more affected by "discount mass merchandiser stores" than larger towns and that shop owners who adapt to the ever-changing retail market can "co-exist and even thrive in this type of environment". In later research Artz and Stone (2006) reported that in Mississippi the impact of opening a Walmart was much larger on existing retailers in rural communities (17%) than more urban ones (4%). This also suggests that Walmart has achieved its strongest growth in non-metropolitan areas, which tend to be low-income.

Studies of the impact of Walmart tend to focus on Supercenters rather than Neighborhood Markets. Comparisons of performance metrics such as sales per square foot suggest that supermarkets and other high-volume retailers in direct competition with Walmart Supercenters show significant decreases in profit margins. While Walmart has often been said to be a destroyer of small businesses, much of this is anecdotal. Research so far suggests that Walmart superstores have little effect on smaller retailers such as "Mom and Pop" businesses. A 2008 economic analysis published in the journal Economic Inquiry suggested that "the process of creative destruction unleashed by Wal‐Mart has had no statistically significant long‐run impact on the overall size and profitability of the small business sector in the United States".

Impact appears to be related to a number of factors, with a key factor being the goods offered for sale. A study by Ailawadi and others (2010) examined the impact of new Walmarts in detail. She reported that median sales dropped 40 percent at similar high-volume stores, 17 percent at supermarkets and 6 percent at drugstores. However, 30 percent of specific product categories at high-volume stores were unaffected. Many retailers reduced prices and cut product selection in an attempt to compete directly with Walmart, in effect attacking its areas of strength. A more successful approach was to track sales, identify vulnerable categories, and increase the range of products in those categories. By including products at both top and bottom price points, and offering temporary promotions on those items, retailers could attract both customers who were price-conscious and those interested in a wider range of options. A small store that specialized in a particular product area could compete effectively against Walmart. Small specialized stores are less effective against big-box category killer chains such as Home Depot and Best Buy electronics.

Some studies have suggested that the impact a Walmart store has on a local business is correlated to its distance from the store. David Merriman, Joseph Persky, Julie Davis and Ron Baiman (2012) outlined the impacts of Walmart in Chicago. Based on three annual surveys of enterprises within a four-mile radius of a new Chicago Walmart it "shows that the probability of going out of business was significantly higher for establishments close to that store". The overall findings of this study reinforce the "contention that large-city Walmarts, like those in small towns, absorb retail sales from nearby stores without significantly expanding the market". Ellickson & Grieco (2013) report in the Journal of Urban Economics that Wal-Marts most strongly affect outlets of larger chains that are within 2 miles (3.2 km) of its location.

=== Effects on jobs ===
A 2022 literature review concludes that "there is no consensus on the impact of Walmart on local employment, but most studies on the topic point to a modest increase in retail employment". For example, studies at the University of Missouri found that a new store increases net retail employment in the county by 100 jobs in the short term, half of which disappear over five years as other retail establishments close.

In broader economic terms, the Economic Policy Institute estimated that between 2001 and 2006 Wal-Mart's trade deficit with China alone represented a loss of nearly 200,000 U.S. jobs. During this period, Wal-Mart was responsible for 9.3% of total U.S. imports from China, increasing the U.S. trade deficit by an estimated $17.1 billion. This represents about 200,000 jobs, most of them in the manufacturing sector (133,000).

In 2014, The Guardian reported that the Wal-Mart Foundation was boosting its efforts to work with U.S. manufacturers. In February 2014, the Walmart Foundation pledged to support domestic manufacturers by buying US$250 billion worth of American-made products in the next decade. Between 2014 and 2017, the Walmart U.S. Manufacturing Innovation Fund gave $10 million in grants to research and academic institutions for projects that improve domestic manufacturing. For the 2020 fiscal year, Walmart reported that nearly two-thirds of its merchandise was made, assembled or grown in the United States. As of March 2021, Walmart pledged to buy an additional $350 billion worth of American-based items over the next decade.

In 2024, Walmart's "Associate to Technician" and "Associate to Driver" pilot programs gave hourly workers opportunities to move into roles as "skilled specialists" like facilities maintenance, refrigeration, heating, ventilation and air conditioning, and automation, "sometimes doubling or tripling their income," according to Forbes. The Associate to Technician program had its first graduating class in December 2024, with the 108 graduates securing new roles.

In 2025, Walmart pledged to invest $1 billion in career-driven training and education by 2026. It also announced its decision "to remove college degree requirements for more than 90% of its jobs" as a way to improve career mobility. Also, Walmart leadership pivoted its workforce strategy, identifying in-demand roles at Walmart and training current employees rather than depending on the external labor market.

=== Effects on productivity ===
A 2001 McKinsey Global Institute study of U.S. labor productivity growth between 1995 and 2000 concluded that "Wal-Mart directly and indirectly caused the bulk of the productivity acceleration" in general merchandise, representing 16 percent of total productivity growth in the retail sector. Walmart's transformative use of information technology, particularly in supply-chain management, is identified as a major reason for its impact on productivity per man hour. For every dollar spent by Walmart to improve its own technology, an estimated ten dollars has been invested by suppliers throughout its supply chain on their own systems and software. Economist Robert Solow has emphasized the importance of imitation and adaptation: in addition to improving its own efficiency, Walmart's innovations have been adopted by its competitors so that they can compete.

== Impact on the environment ==
Walmart's transportation network is a large contributor to its carbon footprint, with transportation fuel emissions increasing by 10% in 2023 to approximately 15.06 million metric tons of CO_{2}.

Another source of environmental concern is refrigerators, which are very important for Walmart's transportation of goods. Walmart's use of refrigerators relies on hydrofluorocarbons (HFCs), chlorofluorocarbons (CFCs), and hydrochlorofluorocarbons (HCFCs), which are potent greenhouse gases. In 2023, refrigerant-related emissions increased by 5.3% due to leaks in equipment across the United States and Mexico. Additionally, Walmart's shipping operations in 2021 produced more greenhouse gases than a coal-fired power station, coming in at 1.7 million metric tons of CO_{2}, underscoring the environmental cost of its logistics. Walmart's practices have faced criticism for contributing to deforestation, specifically in regions that produce palm oil, soy, and beef. Walmart works with suppliers linked to illegal deforestation in critical ecosystems like the Amazon. The company's focus on low-cost, low-quality goods with short lifespans also adds to landfill waste, further harming the environment.

=== Labor relations ===
Workers speak during Occupy Wall Street

With over 2.3 million employees worldwide, Walmart has faced lawsuits and issues with regards to its workforce. These issues involve low wages, poor working conditions, inadequate health care, and issues involving the company's strong anti-union policies. In November 2013, the National Labor Relations Board (NLRB) announced that it had found that in 13 U.S. states, Wal-Mart had pressured employees not to engage in strikes on Black Friday, and had illegally disciplined workers who had engaged in strikes. Critics point to Walmart's high turnover rate as evidence of an unhappy workforce, although other factors may be involved. Approximately 70% of its employees leave within the first year. Despite this turnover rate, the company is still able to affect unemployment rates. This was found in a study by Oklahoma State University which states, "Walmart is found to have substantially lowered the relative unemployment rates of blacks in those counties where it is present, but to have had only a limited impact on relative incomes after the influences of other socio-economic variables were taken into account."

Walmart is the largest private employer in the United States, with 1.6 million employees as of 2020. Walmart employs almost five times as many people as IBM, the second-largest employer. Walmart employs more African Americans than any other private employer in the United States. While 4.6% of all retail workers, and 16.5% of all U.S. grocery workers, were unionized as of 2020, Walmart does not employ unionized labor and actively discourages unionization and collective bargaining.

In 2017, Walmart launched its free in-house training program, Walmart Academy, to teach associates customer service skills, retail math, and how to use new technology.

In 2016 and 2017, Walmart also offered Career Online High School (COHS) through its Lifetime Learning program in partnership with Cengage. Walmart rebranded its Associate Education Benefits, which helped workers complete their high school education and take the GED, to Live Better U in March 2018. Live Better U supports associate education at every level and includes $1 a day college program, cost-free high school education, and discounts on higher education programs through partnership with Guild Education. In 2024, Walmart expanded its online training options through the Live Better U certificate program, including 50 skills associates can complete in four months.

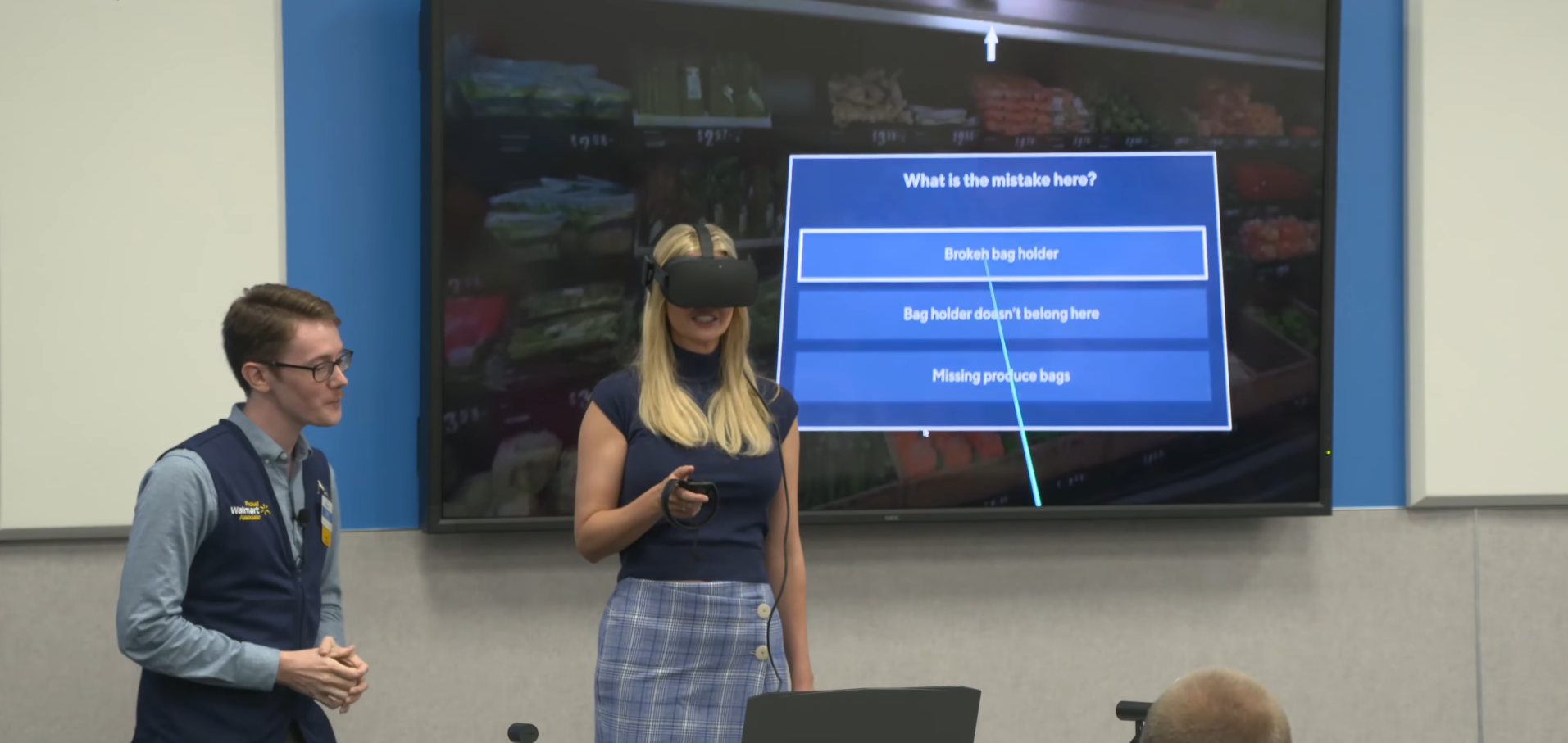
Ivanka Trump trying out the Virtual Reality training system at Walmart Academy in Mesquite, Texas as part of workforce development initiative in 2018.

In June 2019, Walmart Inc. announced the expansion of education benefits to recruit high school students. The incentives include flexible work schedules, free SAT and ACT preparation courses, up to seven hours of free college credit, and a debt-free college degree in three fields from six nonprofit universities.

In 2024, Walmart began offering new perks for employees, including raises and a new bonus plan. In January 2024, Walmart announced it would be raising U.S. store managers' average pay from $117,000 to $128,000 and offering a bonus of up to 200% base pay, effective February 2024. In June 2024, Walmart announced that about 700,000 part-time and full-time employees would become eligible for new bonuses that increase the longer they have been with the company.

In October 2024, Walmart began offering employees and their dependents expanded cancer treatment with doctors at the Mayo Clinic through the retailer's insurance coverage, saying "those covered by the insurance and diagnosed with most types of cancer will be able to get a second opinion from the Mayo Clinic and then travel to the clinic for treatment if needed."

In August 2025, an internal memo by the Chief People Officer announced that Walmart was broadening its 10% employee discount to include most grocery products, year-round. The discount would affect about 1.6 million U.S. employees (after 90 days of employment) and include 95% of Walmart's store products.

=== Gender ===
In 2007, a gender discrimination lawsuit, Dukes v. Wal-Mart Stores, Inc., was filed against Walmart, alleging that female employees were discriminated against in matters regarding pay and promotions. A class action suit was sought, which would have been the nation's largest in history, covering 1.5 million past and current employees. On June 20, 2011, the United States Supreme Court ruled in Wal-Mart's favor, stating that the plaintiffs did not have enough in common to constitute a class. The court ruled unanimously that because of the variability of the plaintiffs' circumstances, the class action could not proceed as presented, and furthermore, in a 5–4 decision that it could not proceed as any kind of class action suit. Several plaintiffs, including the lead plaintiff, Betty Dukes, expressed their intent to file individual discrimination lawsuits separately. Dukes died in 2017. In 2020, Walmart agreed to pay $20 million, stop using a pre-employment test, and furnish other relief to settle a companywide, sex-based hiring discrimination lawsuit filed by the U.S. Equal Employment Opportunity Commission (EEOC).

According to a consultant hired by plaintiffs in a sex discrimination lawsuit, in 2001, Wal-Mart's Equal Employment Opportunity Commission filings showed that female employees made up 65% of Wal-Mart's hourly paid workforce, but only 33% of its management. Just 35% of its store managers were women, compared to 57% at similar retailers. Wal-Mart says comparisons with other retailers are unfair, because it classifies employees differently; if department managers were included in the totals, women would make up 60% of the managerial ranks.

In November 2023, Walmart expanded its nationwide health care coverage, providing up to $1,000 per pregnancy for employees who wanted to enlist the services of a doula.

=== Sexual orientation and gender identity ===
In the Human Rights Campaign's (HRC) 2002 Corporate Equality Index, a measure of how companies treat LGBT employees and customers, gave Wal-Mart Stores Inc. a score of 14%. By 2017, however, HRC's 2017 Corporate Equality Index gave Wal-Mart Stores Inc. a score of a 100%. In 2003, Walmart added sexual orientation to its anti-discrimination policy. In 2005, Walmart's definition of family began including same-sex partners. In 2006, Walmart announced that "diversity efforts include new groups of minority, female and gay employees that meet at Walmart headquarters in Bentonville to advise the company on marketing and internal promotion. There are seven business resource groups: women, African Americans, Hispanics, Asians, Native Americans, gays and lesbians, and a disabled group." From 2006 to 2008, Walmart was a member of the National Gay & Lesbian Chamber of Commerce. In 2011, Walmart added gender identity to their anti-discrimination policy. Walmart's anti-discrimination policies allow associates to use restroom facilities that corresponds with their gender identity and gender expression. In 2013, Walmart began offering health insurance benefits to domestic partners. In 2015, Doug McMillon, CEO of Walmart, issued a statement opposing House Bill 1228 and asked Governor Asa Hutchinson to veto the bill. In 2016, Walmart began offering full healthcare benefits to its transgender employees.

== Criticism and controversies ==
Walmart has been subject to criticism from various groups and individuals, including labor unions, community groups, grassroots organizations, religious organizations, environmental groups, firearm groups, and the company's own customers and employees. They have protested against the company's policies and business practices, including charges of racial and gender discrimination. Other areas of criticism include the company's foreign product sourcing, treatment of suppliers, employee compensation and working conditions, environmental practices, the use of public subsidies, the company's security policies, and slavery. Walmart denies wrongdoing and maintains that low prices are the result of efficiency.

=== Animal welfare ===
In 2012 and 2013, undercover investigations by Mercy for Animals (MFA) showed pigs at Walmart pork suppliers in Minnesota being allegedly mistreated. MFA launched a high-profile campaign to pressure Walmart to stop sourcing crated pork, including protests at Walmart stores in at least 145 cities and a signed letter from several actors calling on the company to end the use of "cruel" gestation crates. In May 2015, Walmart issued animal welfare guidelines suggesting that suppliers give pigs, egg-laying hens, and veal calves more room to move, but it was criticized by animal welfare groups for not being mandatory.

In 2024, the shareholder activism organization The Accountability Board authored a shareholder resolution requesting Walmart publish targets for ending the use of gestation crates in its pork supply chain. At a shareholder meeting in June 2024, the resolution received the support of 12.5% of Walmart investors.

In April 2016, Walmart announced plans to eliminate battery cage eggs from its supply chain by 2025. The decision was particularly important because of Walmart's large market share and influence on the rest of the industry. The move was praised by major animal welfare groups but a poultry trade group representative expressed skepticism about the decision's impact. As of 2023, 21% of Walmart's eggs and 41% of Sam's Club eggs were produced in cage-free facilities. Walmart was one of several retailers, including Target and Costco, that missed the 100% cage-free egg goal for 2025, citing bird flu outbreaks and affordability concerns.

=== Business practices ===
In March 2018, Walmart was sued by former Director of Business Development Tri Huynh for claims of reporting misleading e-commerce performance results in favor of the company. Huynh stated the company's move was an attempt to regain lost ground to competitor Amazon.

In September 2018, Walmart was sued by Equal Employment Opportunity Commission alleging that Walmart denied requests from pregnant employees to limit heavy lifting.

In July 2019, the Walmart subreddit was flooded with pro-union memes in a protest to the firing of an employee who posted confidential material to the subreddit. Many of these posts were angry with Walmart surveilling its staff on the Internet. The posting of the union content is in response to the aforementioned alleged anti-union position Walmart has taken in the past.

In June 2022, the Federal Trade Commission (FTC) sued Walmart, alleging that the company facilitated money transfer fraud by allowing its money transfer services to be used by scammers who stole hundreds of millions of dollars from customers.

=== Crime problems ===
According to an August 2016 report by Bloomberg Businessweek, aggressive cost-cutting decisions that began in 2000 when Lee Scott took over as CEO of the company led to a significant increase in crime in stores across the United States. These included the removal of the store's famed greeters, who are in part seen as a theft deterrent at exits, the replacement of many cashiers with self-checkout stations, and the addition of stores at a rate that exceeded the hiring of new employees, which led to a 19% increase in space per employee from a decade previous. While these decisions succeeded in increasing profits 23% in the decade that followed, they also led to an increase in both theft and violent crime.

In 2015, under CEO Doug McMillon, Walmart began a company-wide campaign to reduce crime that included spot-checking receipts at exits, stationing employees at self-checkout areas, eye-level security cameras in high-theft areas, use of data analytics to detect credit fraud, hiring off-duty police and private security officers, and reducing calls to police with a program by which first-time offenders caught stealing merchandise below a certain value can avoid arrest if they agree to go through a theft-prevention program.

Law enforcement agencies across the United States have noted a burden on resources created by a disproportionate number of calls from Walmart. Experts have criticized the retailer for shifting its security burden onto the taxpayers. Across three Florida counties, approximately 9,000 police calls were logged to 53 Walmart stores but resulted in only a few hundred arrests. In Granite Falls, North Carolina, 92% of larceny calls to local police were from the Walmart store. The trend is similar in rural, suburban, and urban areas. Police are called to Walmart stores 3 to 4 times as much as similar retailers such as Target. Experts say the chain and its razor-thin profit margins rely heavily on police to protect its bottom line. Walmart Supercenters top the list of those most visited by police.

In addition to hundreds of thousands of petty crimes, more than 200 violent crimes, including attempted kidnappings, stabbings, shootings, and murders occurred at the 4,500 Walmarts in the U.S. in 2016. In 2019, 23 people were killed in a mass shooting at a Walmart store in El Paso, Texas.

On June 27, 2020, a shooting occurred at a Walmart distribution center in Red Bluff, California, United States. One employee was killed and the shooter was killed by officers.

On July 26, 2025, a mass stabbing occurred in a Walmart store in Traverse City, Michigan. Eleven people were stabbed, some with life-threatening injuries.

On November 22, 2026, two Indians were killed in a shooting outside in a Walmart store in Surrey, British Columbia, in Canada, and the police believed that it was a targeted attack linked to organised crime.

=== Product safety ===
In 2012, Walmart's pork and mango supply chain was contaminated, resulting in a large number of customers suffering from severe food poisoning. In order to resolve the incident immediately, Walmart recalled all contaminated pork and mangoes and emptied its inventory to prevent further sales.

In May 2019, the Center for Inquiry filed a lawsuit in the District of Columbia alleging consumer fraud and the endangering of its customers' health due to Walmart's practice of "selling homeopathic [products] alongside real medicine, in the same sections in its stores, under the same signs", according to Nicholas Little, CFI's vice president and general counsel. On May 20, 2020, District of Columbia Superior Court Judge Florence Pan dismissed CFI's lawsuit, claiming that CFI had no standing as a consumer protection organization and failed to identify the specific actions on the part of Walmart that led to harm to consumers. CFI has challenged both of those arguments and is planning an appeal.

In November 2021, a federal jury found that Walmart, along with Walgreens and CVS, "had substantially contributed to" the opioid crisis. The damages between the three chains in this suit totalled $650 million. Damages claimed by the lawyers for Lake County and Trumbull County in Ohio were $3.3 billion.

In August 2026, Walmart agreed to pay $50 million to settle allegations by the U.S. Department of Justice and Drug Enforcement Administration that its pharmacies had illegally filled thousands of invalid prescriptions for opioids and other controlled substances. The government alleged that Walmart failed to adequately respond to warning signs involving suspicious prescriptions and prescribers, including suspected "pill mill" doctors. Walmart did not admit liability as part of the settlement, which also requires the company to strengthen oversight of pharmacy dispensing practices and establish a hotline for reporting suspected illegal activity. The settlement followed earlier opioid-related litigation against Walmart, including a $3.1 billion settlement with state and local governments in 2022.

=== Lawsuits and cases ===
Walmart has faced major class-action and high-profile lawsuits throughout its history, most notably reaching the U.S. Supreme Court or resulting in multi-million dollar settlements. The most famous U.S. Supreme Court case involving Walmart is Wal-Mart Stores, Inc. v. Dukes (2011), which ruled 5–4 that a massive class-action gender discrimination lawsuit could not proceed as a nationwide class. In 2026, Walmart agreed to a $100 million judgment to settle allegations from the Federal Trade Commission and a bipartisan group of 11 state attorneys general. The lawsuit alleged that Walmart had systematically misled its network of nearly 1 million gig delivery drivers since 2021.

A complaint filed in December 2020 and later amended in the United States District Court for the District of Delaware, the suit accused Walmart of violating the Controlled Substances Act since June 2013. In 2026, Walmart agreed to pay a $50 million financial penalty for fueling the nationwide opioid epidemic by unlawfully dispensing controlled substances from its pharmacies.

== Sponsorships ==
In 2025, Walmart signed multi-year partnership that makes it an official partner of Major League Soccer and Leagues Cup. In 2026, Walmart Canada became an official partner of Canada Soccer and Canadian Premier League, and Jonathan David has been named as Walmart Canada ambassador.

Arkansas Razorbacks of the University of Arkansas has multiyear partnership with Walmart.

== Case studies and academic significance ==
Walmart has been extensively studied in business schools, universities, and economic research for its influence on modern retailing, logistics, and corporate strategy. The company is frequently used as a case-study subject in courses relating to supply-chain management, operations, organizational behavior, globalization, and competitive strategy. As of May 2026, the Harvard Business Publishing catalog contains over 65 distinct case studies and curriculum materials where Walmart is the primary subject.

Its large-scale distribution network, inventory management systems, and retail practices have been analyzed in teaching materials and academic discussions at institutions including Harvard Business School, Stanford Graduate School of Business, and Wharton School. Walmart has often been cited as an example of operational efficiency, economies of scale, and data-driven retail management. Management scholars and economists such as Michael Porter, Clayton Christensen, Rosabeth Moss Kanter, C. K. Prahalad and Pankaj Ghemawat have referenced Walmart in discussions concerning competition, innovation, globalization, and corporate influence.

In the wake of the tragic murder of George Floyd, Walmart provided direct financial backing, organizational data, and collaborative insights to support the development of the McKinsey & Company report named "Race in the Workplace: The Black Experience in the U.S. Private Sector", which analyzes private-sector data from 24 top companies to reveal the systemic educational, geographical, and criminal justice hurdles facing Black workers.

== In popular culture ==
=== Movies and TV show ===
- Walmart has appeared in several Hollywood movies, such as Where the Heart Is, Looney Tunes: Back in Action, Zombieland, and Ghostbusters: Afterlife.

=== Documentaries ===
- Several documentaries feature the company namely - Wal-Mart: The High Cost of Low Price. Capitalism: A Love Story, Why Wal-Mart Works; and Why That Drives Some People C-R-A-Z-Y has discussions about corporate power and worker conditions.

=== Others ===
- The Goods: Live Hard, Sell Hard - contains jokes referencing Walmart's dominance in retail.
- "Something Wall-Mart This Way Comes" – a 2004 episode of Comedy Central's South Park

== See also ==
- Big-box store
- Lukas Walton
- Walmart greeter
- Wal-Mart First Tee Open at Pebble Beach – former name of a golf tournament
- Walmarting – a neologism
- Why Wal-Mart Works; and Why That Drives Some People C-R-A-Z-Y – a 2005 rebuttal to the Greenwald documentary
