= Crystal Pepsi =

Clear cola by PepsiCo

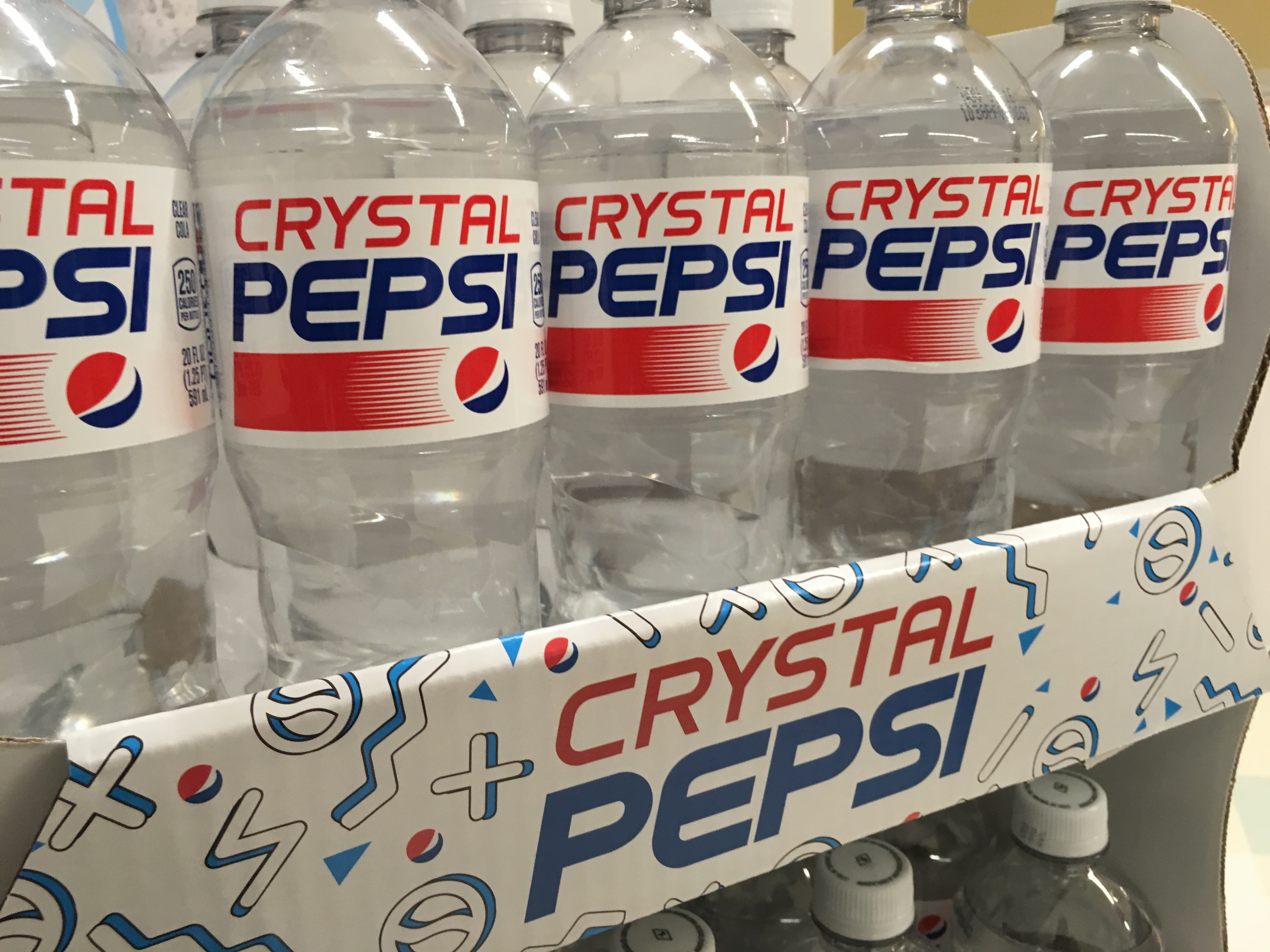
- Crystal Pepsi bottles in a store
- Type: Clear cola
- Manufacturer: PepsiCo
- Origin: United States
- Introduced: April 13, 1992; 34 years ago
- Discontinued: 1994; 32 years ago (original run)
- Variants: Diet Crystal Pepsi, Crystal From Pepsi
- Related products: Pepsi Blue, Tab Clear

Crystal Pepsi is a cola made by PepsiCo. It was initially marketed in the United States and Canada between 1992 and 1994, and has had sporadic limited releases since 2016.

In 1991, PepsiCo's leadership reshaped the company. It aimed to capitalize on healthy food consumption trends to stimulate the slowing cola market. After 1,000 product concepts and 3,000 formulations, it discovered a lighter flavor and appearance, with modified food starch instead of caramel color and 20 fewer calories. It resembles standard Pepsi but reportedly tastes less acidic.

Crystal Pepsi was launched in 1992 with a large marketing campaign and to great success, capturing a 1% share of the US soft drink market in its first year. Consumer enthusiasm quickly tailed off, however, and Coca-Cola launched Tab Clear as a deliberate copy to sabotage Crystal Pepsi. Production of Crystal Pepsi ceased in late 1993. Inspired by a grassroots campaign via telephone and the Internet, it was briefly re-released sporadically in the 2010s.

== Creation ==
=== Background ===
The Coca-Cola Company had produced a clear cola in the past, produced as a secret one-off made as a particular political favor between General Dwight D. Eisenhower and top Soviet General Georgy Zhukov. Clear Coca-Cola, named White Coke, was produced to disguise the beverage as vodka.

The clear craze was a global marketing fad in the 1980s and 1990s, equating clarity with purity. The fad was inspired by the reintroduction of Ivory soap and its marketing slogan of "99 and 44/100 percent pure". In 1990, a Canadian manufacturer released a colorless cola, called Canadian Spirit, which it tested in Boston, New York, Washington, Toronto, and Montreal. Soft drink sales boomed in the 1980s with popularization of diet drinks, but in 1991 slowed to a 1.8% growth rate.

Pepsi-Cola North America CEO Craig Weatherup was ambitiously internally restructuring the company while launching a multi-faceted development and marketing plan to expand as a "total beverage company". This included the fast-growing and expandable New Age beverage market, with established competition from Clearly Canadian (reportedly having "built a new market in two years"), Nordic Mist, Snapple, and the waning Original New York Seltzer. PepsiCo was reportedly "a lot more free-thinking and willing to make errors [... already having] made some very good errors".

=== Development ===
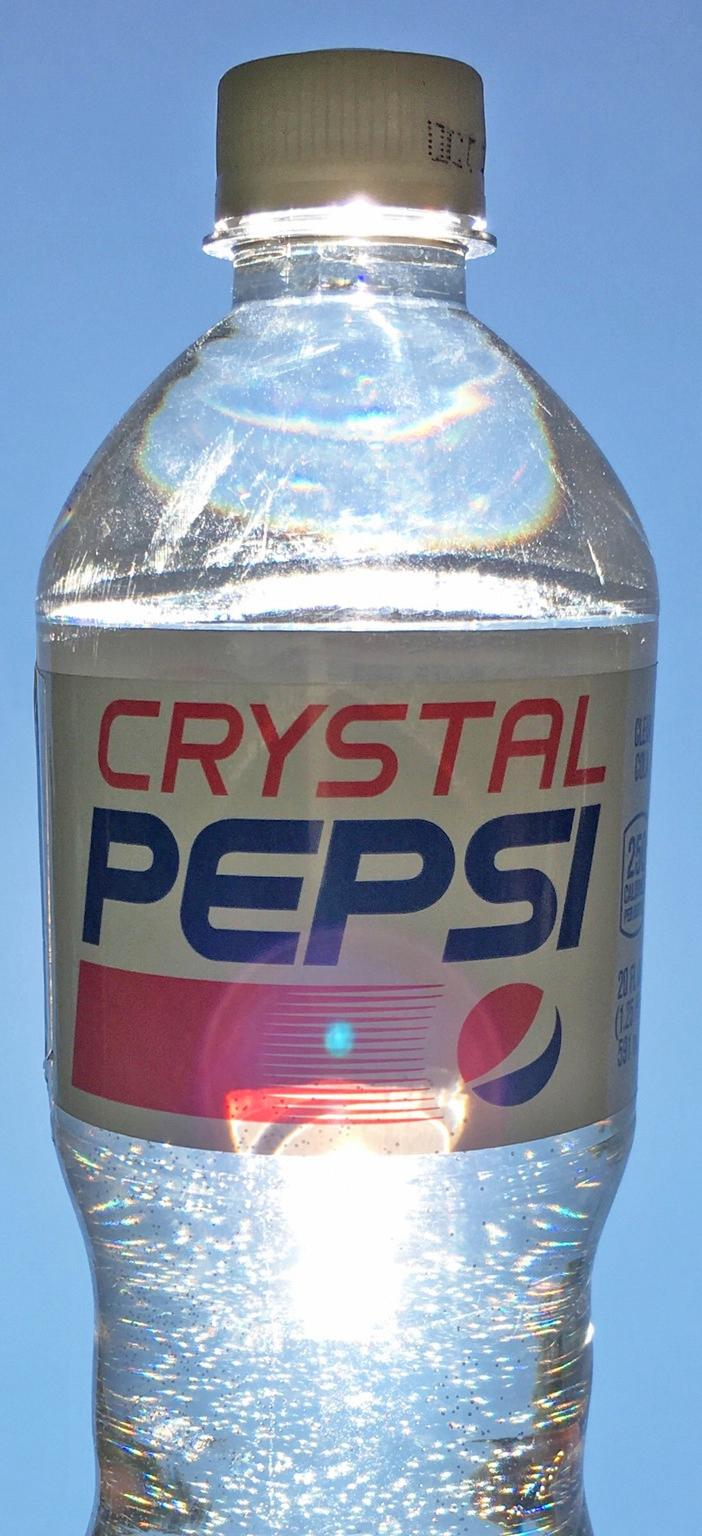
Close-up of the clear liquid of Crystal Pepsi (2016 version) in the sun

PepsiCo's internal research already had "1,000 different product concepts", but its consumer research demanded a healthier variety of cola, which was the number one soft-drink segment at 60% and yet slowing. Food technologists knew that food color strongly affects flavor perceptions, associating light flavors with light colors. Pepsi's traditional caramel coloring, which adds body and flavor, was replaced with modified food starch for body with a clear look. PepsiCo devised 3,000 formulations of a new clear drink, under consumer testing. A 12-ounce (340 g) serving of Crystal Pepsi has 134 calories compared to Pepsi's 154 calories—20 fewer. In November 1991, Pepsi-Cola publicly confirmed that it was working on a colorless version of Pepsi.

Yum! Brands chairman David C. Novak is credited with introducing the Crystal Pepsi concept. In a December 2007 interview, he reminisced:

It was a tremendous learning experience. I still think it's the best idea I ever had, and the worst executed. A lot of times as a leader you think, "They don't get it; they don't see my vision." People were saying we should stop and address some issues along the way, and they were right. It would have been nice if I'd made sure the product tasted good. Once you have a great idea and you blow it, you don't get a chance to resurrect it.

== Distribution ==
On April 13, 1992, Crystal Pepsi was launched in test markets of Dallas, Providence, Salt Lake City, and Colorado to a positive response. One month in test markets showed an unusually and unexpectedly strong launch due to product uniqueness and unprecedented consumer awareness. In Colorado, interviews of 100,000 customers further revealed demand for a diet version. This led to PepsiCo launching Diet Crystal Pepsi on August 8, 1992, initially in a new test market Grand Rapids, and launched in Colorado in October.

Crystal Pepsi was launched nationwide in the US beginning in first half of December 1992. The drink was also informally referred to as "Crystal Clear Pepsi" or "Pepsi Clear". In its first year, it captured one full percentage point of U.S. soft drink sales, or approximately $474 million (equivalent to $1.06 billion in 2025). The drink also launched in Canada in January 1993. Coca-Cola followed by launching Tab Clear on December 14, 1992.

PepsiCo did not release Crystal Pepsi overseas while it was being marketed in the United States and Canada. The company instead released a different low-calorie drink, Pepsi Max, in Europe and Australia in 1993.

By late 1993, Crystal Pepsi was discontinued, and the final batches were delivered to retailers during the first few months of 1994. Several months later, Pepsi briefly released a reformulated citrus-cola hybrid called Crystal From Pepsi.

=== Marketing ===
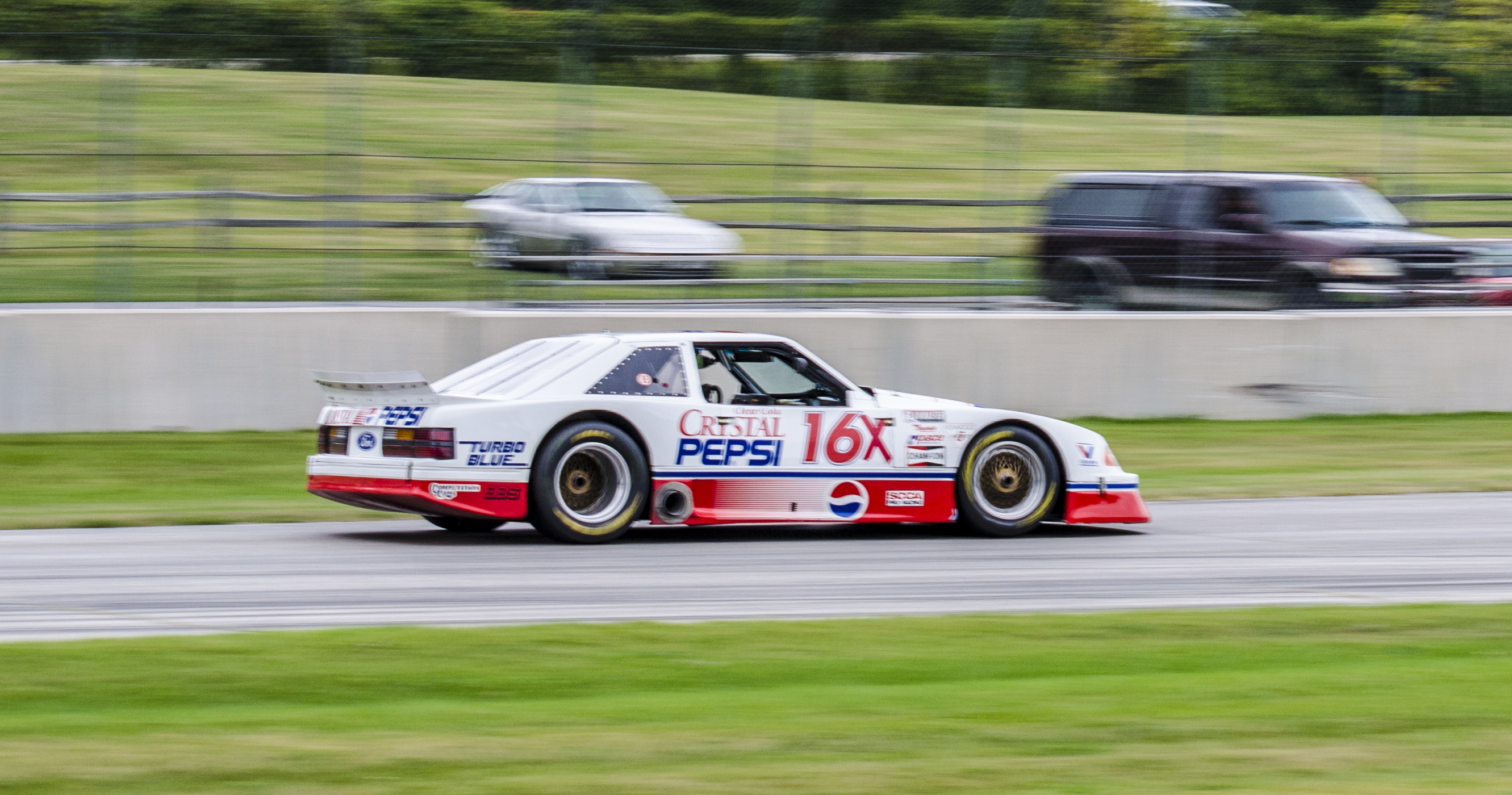
Crystal Pepsi racing car advertisement

Crystal Pepsi was marketed as a caffeine-free "clear alternative" to normal colas. Its official slogan was "You've never seen a taste like this".

Gary Hemphill, public relations manager for PepsiCo Inc, said "The basic philosophy behind Crystal Pepsi is this: Crystal Pepsi is not Pepsi with the color stripped out. It's a totally new product. It tastes differently than Pepsi [... which we married] to some of the attributes of the so-called New Age type products: lighter and less sweet tasting, clear, caffeine-free, all natural flavors, and no preservatives." A senior vice president relayed expectation of forging "an entirely new category that really transcends New Age". Test marketing suggested that 80% of sales would come from non-Pepsi consumers. The goal was to capture 2% of the $48 billion retail soft drink market by the end of 1993, or about $1 billion, but without harming the flagship Pepsi product.

The $40 million marketing campaign included a teaser ad during the television coverage of the inauguration of the US President and $7 million of Super Bowl advertisements. The company invented the world's first photo-realistic, computer-generated bus wrap printing. A series of television advertisements featuring Van Halen's hit song "Right Now" premiered on national television on January 31, 1993, during Super Bowl XXVII. This advertisement was parodied by Saturday Night Live as Crystal Gravy. Full-sized sample bottles were distributed with the Sunday paper deliveries such as the Boston Globe in Massachusetts.

According to Coca-Cola's chief marketing officer, Sergio Zyman, Tab Clear was released at the same time, as an intentional "kamikaze" effort to create an unpopular beverage that was positioned as an analogue of Crystal Pepsi to "kill both in the process". The "born to die" strategy included using the poor-performing Tab brand rather than Coke, labeling the product as a "sugar-free" diet drink to confuse consumers into thinking Crystal Pepsi had no sugar, and marketing the product as if it were "medicinal". Zyman said "Pepsi spent an enormous amount of money on the brand and, regardless, we killed it. Both of them were dead within six months."

== Reception ==
In its first year, Crystal Pepsi captured 1% of U.S. soft drink sales, or approximately $474 million. Beverage Digest said "This is another instance where Pepsi has really shown leadership to strike out in a new direction." Crystal Pepsi was named Best New Product of the Year for 1992 by Richard Saunders International, based on consumer preference polls among 16,000 new grocery products, scoring higher than any other beverage in the poll's history. Robert McMath, editor of Brand Week, said that "new sells [and] clarity equals purity" but he doubted the strategy of positioning such a new and different product directly alongside the old flagship product.

Shortly after Crystal Pepsi's nationwide release, The Coca-Cola Company followed by launching Tab Clear on December 14, 1992. During 1993, several other manufacturers also released colorless versions of their existing products, such as colorless Palmolive dish soap, colorless Softsoap liquid soap, and colorless Rembrandt mouthwash. Even the Miller Brewing Company released a colorless beer, called Miller Clear, in Richmond, Minneapolis, and Austin the following year.

However, after its initial success, Crystal Pepsi quickly became more of a fad as the trend of clear sodas wore off. According to PepsiCo, Crystal Pepsi sales played a large part in the company's profits for the first quarter of 1993 (when it launched nationally), but otherwise did not have much impact for the full year profits of 1993. Subsequently and presently, Crystal Pepsi has been viewed as a failure. Its failure has also been attributed to the apparent deterioration of its taste when the bottle was exposed in the sun.

== Revival ==
In 2005, a similarly transparent Pepsi cola was launched in Mexico and sold for a limited time as Pepsi Clear. On August 22, 2008, PepsiCo filed for trademarks in the United States on the product names "Pepsi Clear" and "Diet Pepsi Clear", but both were soon abandoned. Pepsi Clear was later released in Thailand in 2025, but as a zero sugar clear cola. In September 2019, a clear cola drink called Pepsi Nex II was launched in Japan by the local distributor, Suntory. This occurred not long after the local release of Coca-Cola Clear.

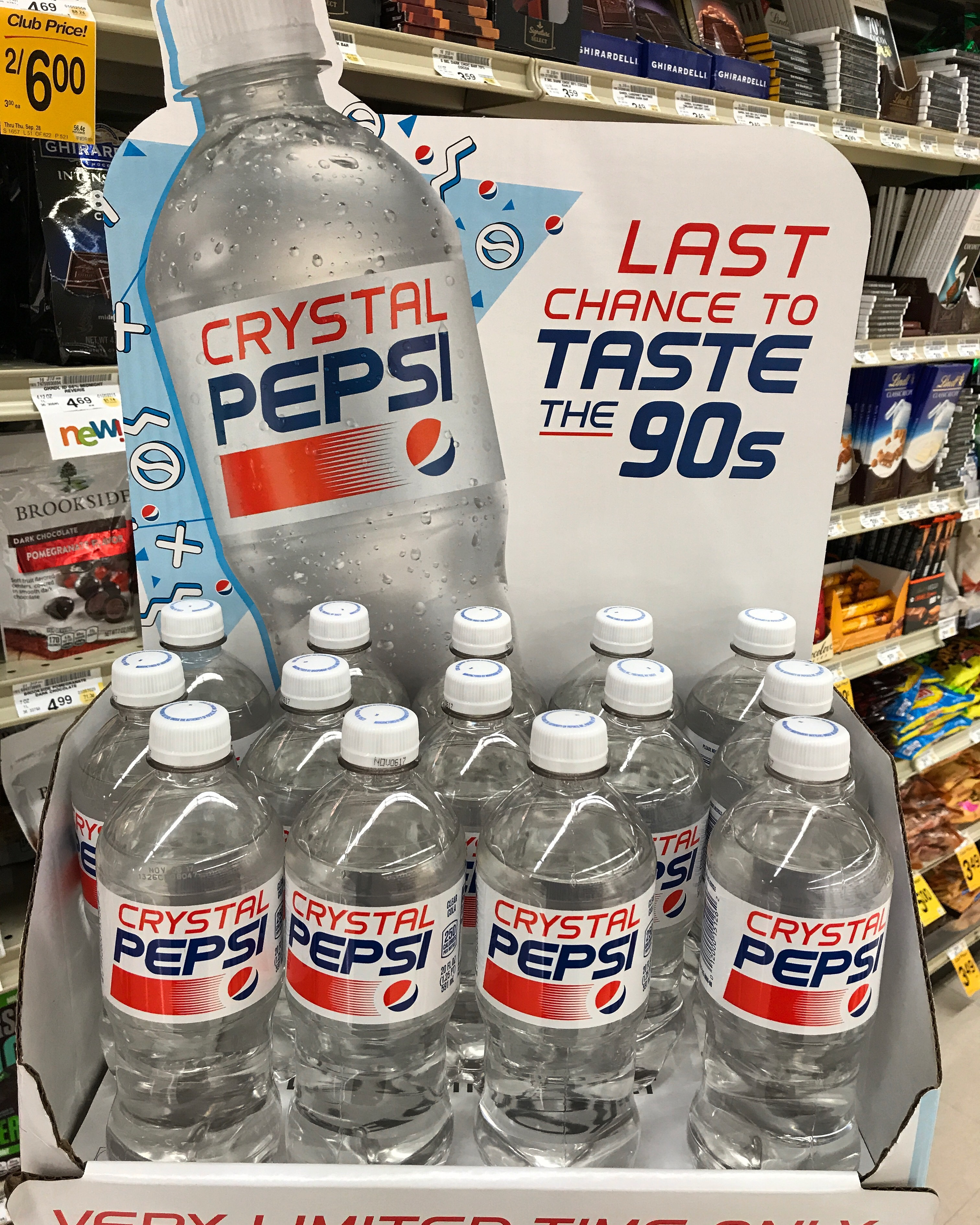
Store in Maryland with Crystal Pepsi, 2017

In March 2015, an online grassroots campaign began to bring back Crystal Pepsi, encouraged by a similar campaign that made The Coca-Cola Company reintroduce Surge in the United States. The following month, a second, separate petition was led by an online competitive eating personality, Kevin Strahle, also known as The L.A. Beast, who had made a 2013 viral video of himself drinking a vintage bottle of Crystal Pepsi. This generated enough interest for a telephone and email campaign, garnering around 37,000 Change.org petition signatures, tens of thousands of tagged comments on social media, 15 billboards erected around the Los Angeles area, and a commitment to ride a mobile billboard truck at PepsiCo's headquarters in Purchase, New York with a gathering of supporters at a park nearby on June 15 and 16, 2015.

The interest from this campaign led to an official response to Strahle by PepsiCo on June 8, 2015: "We've had customers ask us to bring back their favorite products before, but never with your level of enthusiasm and humor. We're lucky to have a Pepsi superfan like you on our side. We definitely hear you and your followers and we think you'll all be happy with what's in store. Stay tuned." A year later, PepsiCo officially brought back Crystal Pepsi for a limited time, beginning on July 11, 2016 in Canada and August 8 in America. It was promoted with a retro styled website and marketing video, including The Crystal Pepsi Trail browser game as an officially licensed parody of the classic The Oregon Trail. PepsiCo brought the product back again as part of the drink's 30th anniversary in 2022 with a total of 300 units given away as part of a competition.

== See also ==
- Coca-Cola Clear
- List of defunct consumer brands
- List of Pepsi types
- New Coke
- Zima
