= Chaska =

Chaska may refer to:

- Chaska, Minnesota, U.S.
  - Chaska High School
- Chaska Township, Carver County, Minnesota
- We-Chank-Wash-ta-don-pee or Chaska (died 1862), Dakota Native American

== See also ==
- Chasca (disambiguation)
