= Leslie Yalof Garfield =

American lawyer

Leslie Garfield Tenzer (born June 5, 1960) is a Professor of Law at Pace Law School, White Plains, New York, United States. Professor Garfield got her start in the Academic Support arena and was a force in creating the Association of American Law Schools's (AALS) Section on Academic Support. Professor Garfield teaches a wide-variety of law school courses and is currently focusing her teaching on the traditional first year course; Contracts, Criminal Law and Torts. She also serves as an editor of the Journal of Court Innovation. Professor Garfield has emerged as an expert on teaching law to non-lawyers, law students, and those returning to the profession. She regularly lectures nationally on substantive law and legal skills. In addition to teaching at Pace, she has appeared on News 12 Westchester and regularly lectures for law firms and companies including Kaplan Test Prep bar review programs and New Directions, a program for non-practicing lawyers interested in returning to the work-force.

== Biography ==
Garfield was born in New York City, and she was raised in Livingston, New Jersey. She is the daughter of Herbert Yalof, former President and Chief Operating Officer of Macy's North East. Her mother, Ina Yalof is a writer who has published 16 books. Her sister, Suze Yalof Schwartz is the former Editor-at-Large of Glamour Magazine. Her brother, Stephen Yalof, is an executive with Polo Ralph Lauren

Garfield received her both her BA ('82) and JD ('85) from the University of Florida. She is the mother of three children.

Garfield began her career at Pace Law School teaching legal research and writing. After one year, Garfield left Pace to serve as a legislative attorney for the New York City Council. While there, she worked on several pieces of legislation, most notably mandating window guards for apartments with small children, creating business improvement districts and the city's first law regulating smoking in public spaces. In 1990 Professor Garfield returned to Pace, where she started the school's nationally recognized Academic Support Program. In 1998 she was granted tenure and in 2003, and again in 2012, she was awarded the prestigious Ottinger Award for outstanding teaching, scholarship and service. <Pace Law School> In 2012, Professor Garfield was also awarded the Goettel Prize for outstanding faculty scholarship.

== Articles ==
- "The Case for a Criminal Law Theory of Intentional Infliction of Emotional Distress"
- "Don't Count Them Out Just Yet: Toward the Plausible Use of Race-Preference Student Assignment Plans", <10 Rutgers Race and the Law Review (2008)>
- "Adding Colors to the Chameleon: Why the Supreme Court May Adopt a New Compelling Governmental Interest Test for Race-Preference Student Assignment Plan's", <56 Kansas Law Review 101 (2008)>
- "The Glass Half Full: Envisioning the Future of Race Preference Policies", 63 New York University Annual Survey of the Law 385 (2007)>
- "The Cost of Good Intentions: Why the Supreme Court's Decision Upholding Affirmative Action Admission Programs is Detrimental to the Cause", <27 Pace Law Review 15 (2006)>
- "Back to Bakke: Defining the Strict Scrutiny Test for Affirmative Action Policies Aimed at Achieving Diversity in the Classroom", <83 Nebraska Law Review 631 (2005)>
- "A More Principled Approach to Criminalizing Carelessness: A Prescription for the Legislature" <65 Tenn. L. Rev. 875 (1998)>

== Tasteful Tort Tuesday ==
A weekly tradition, occurring every Tuesday, in which the majority of Professor Garfield's torts class dress up in business-attire fashion. It was originated around October 2010 when 2 students, Nick S. and Brad G., realized they forgot to do laundry and had to wear suits to class. The tradition has included: canes, three-piece suits, and various forms of classy dress. Tasteful Torts Tuesday is not to be confused with "A Touch-of-Grey Day" in Emily Waldman's Civil Procedure class in which students dressed like distinguished guest-speaker Adam Cohen.
