= Zima (drink) =

Carbonated alcoholic beverage

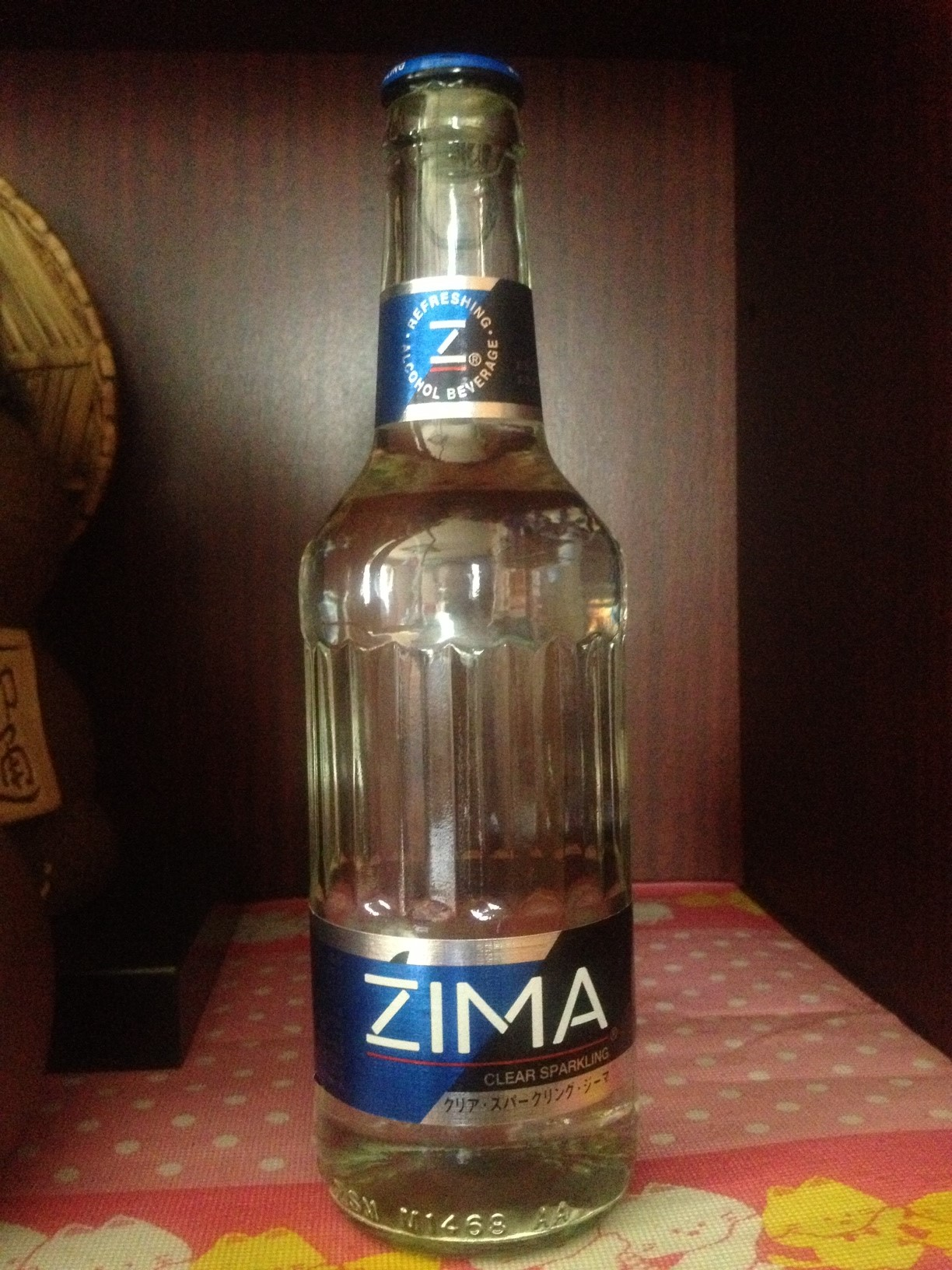
- Type: Malt beverage
- Manufacturer: Coors Brewing Company
- Origin: United States
- Introduced: 1993 (U.S.); 1996 (Japan)
- Discontinued: October 2008 (U.S.)
- Alcohol by volume: 4.7–5.4%
- Proof (US): 9.4°–10.8°
- Colour: clear
- Variants: Citrus, Tangerine, Pineapple
- Related products: Smirnoff Ice malt beverage

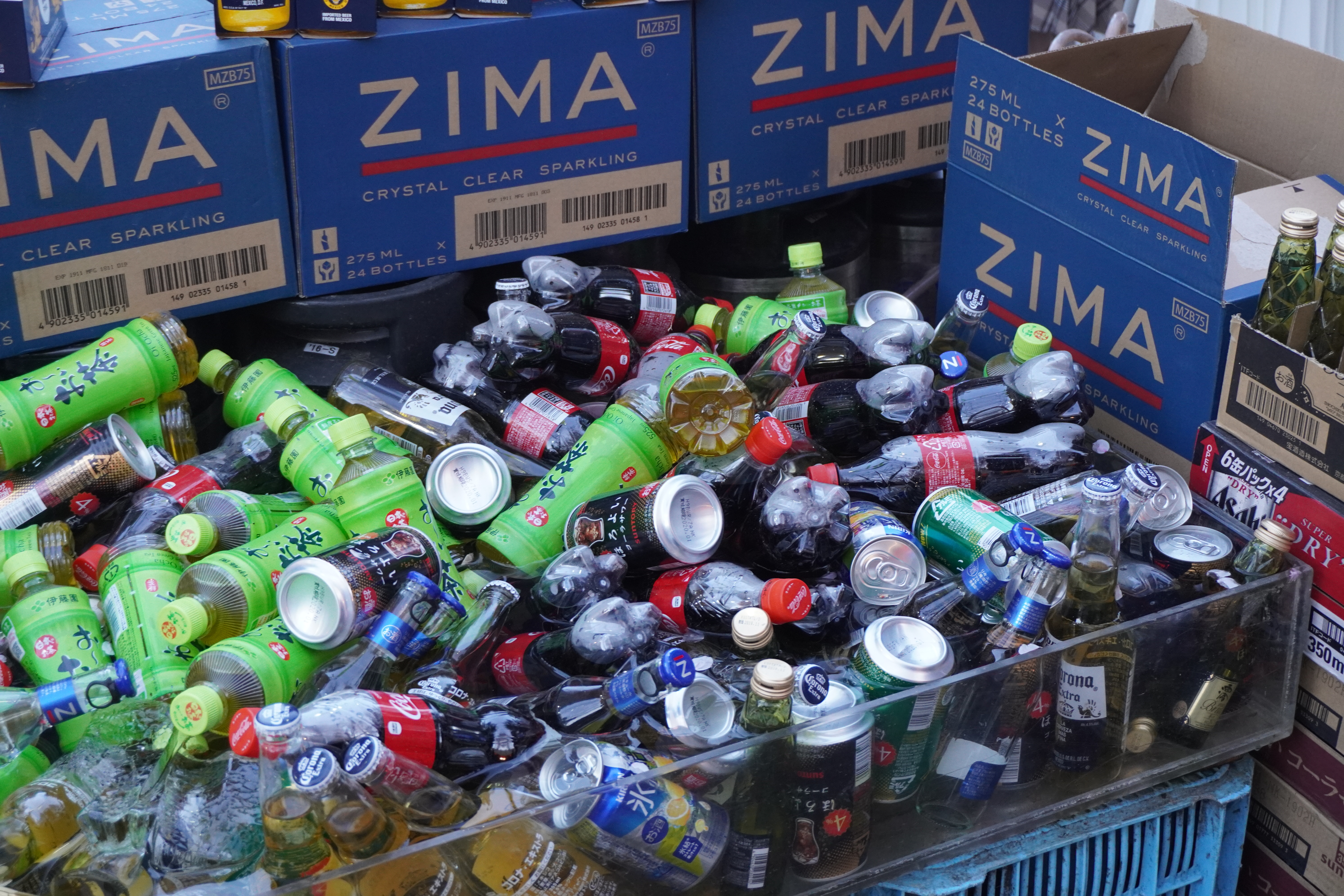
Zima boxes in a Japanese store

Zima Clearmalt was a clear, lightly carbonated alcoholic beverage made and distributed by the Coors Brewing Company or its licensees. Introduced in 1993, it was marketed as an alternative to beer, an example of what is now often referred to as a cooler, with 4.7–5.4% alcohol by volume. Its production in the United States ceased in October 2008, though it returned for limited releases in the summers of 2017 and 2018. In Japan, however, Zima was sold continuously until 2021, when sales ended due to the impact of the COVID-19 pandemic before returning in 2023.

== History ==
Zima means "winter" in many Slavic languages. It was launched nationally in the United States as Zima Clearmalt in 1993 after being test-marketed two years earlier in the cities of Nashville, Sacramento, and Syracuse. The lemon-lime flavored drink was part of the "clear craze" of the 1990s that produced products such as Crystal Pepsi and Tab Clear. Early advertisements for Zima described it as a "truly unique alcohol beverage" and used the tagline "Zomething different".

Zima offered an alternative to the then-successful wine cooler category. Coors spent $50 million marketing Zima in its first year, persuading nearly half of American alcohol drinkers to try it. Brandweek magazine reported that at Zima's peak in 1994, 1.2 million barrels of the beverage were sold. It was originally popular among young women. Coors made its first attempt at attracting young men to the brand in 1995 by marketing Zima Gold (an amber-colored beverage that promised a "taste of bourbon"). The drink was unpopular and disappeared from store shelves within the year.

In a 2008 article, writer Brendan Koerner cited Zima's perceived reputation as a "girly-man" beverage and its persistent parodying by late-night TV host David Letterman as factors in the drink's decline. The Chicago Tribune reported that distributors were asked to stock "caffeinated alcoholic beverage Sparks on retail store shelves to make up for Zima’s absence".

In the late 2000s, the beverage was marketed in additional flavors: citrus, tangerine, and pineapple citrus.

On October 20, 2008, MillerCoors LLC announced that it had discontinued production of Zima in the U.S., choosing instead to focus on other "malternative" beverages.

In 2017, MillerCoors announced that they were bringing Zima back to the U.S. market in a limited release beginning on the July 4 weekend. Demand for the product exceeded the company's expectations, selling out entirely by September. As a result, in May 2018 MillerCoors announced it would once again bring back Zima for a limited time, with 40 percent more inventory available than in 2017.

== Japan ==
Zima was launched in Japan in 1996, where it proved more popular than in its home market. In contrast to its U.S. reputation as a drink for young women, Zima was consumed in Japan by both genders from most age groups, often as an accompaniment to meals. However, sales were heavily affected by the COVID-19 lockdowns, with overall alcohol sales to businesses such as bars and restaurants in 2020 dropping by nearly 90 percent compared to the previous year, and Coors ended its operations in Japan; Zima was discontinued by December 31, 2021. In 2023, however, Coors reached an agreement with Hakutsuru Sake Brewing Co. to distribute Zima and Blue Moon in Japan.

== See also ==
- List of defunct consumer brands
