= Ottinger =

Ottinger is a surname derived from the city of Oettingen in Bavaria. Notable people with the surname include:

- Albert Ottinger (1878–1938), New York politician of the Republican Party
- Didier Ottinger (born 1957), French museum curator and art critic
- Ferenc Ottinger (1792–1869), Hungarian general in the 1848–49 Revolution
- Friedrich Christoph Oetinger (1702–1782), German theosophist
- George M. Ottinger (1833–1917), American artist
- Günther Oettinger (born 1953), German politician
- Howard G. Ottinger (1888–1964), American businessman, farmer, and politician
- Konrad Öttinger (born 1530), Reformation-era German Protestant theologian
- L. D. Ottinger (born 1938), former NASCAR driver
- Leonora von Ottinger, American actress
- Richard Ottinger (1929–2026), American lawyer, politician, and legal educator from New York
- Ulrike Ottinger (born 1942), German filmmaker

== Fictional characters who share this surname ==
- Eugene Ottinger from Wednesday.

== See also ==
- Oettinger (disambiguation)
- Köstinger
