= Walnut Street Historic District (Chaska, Minnesota) =

Historic district in Minnesota, United States

- U.S. National Register of Historic Places
- U.S. Historic district
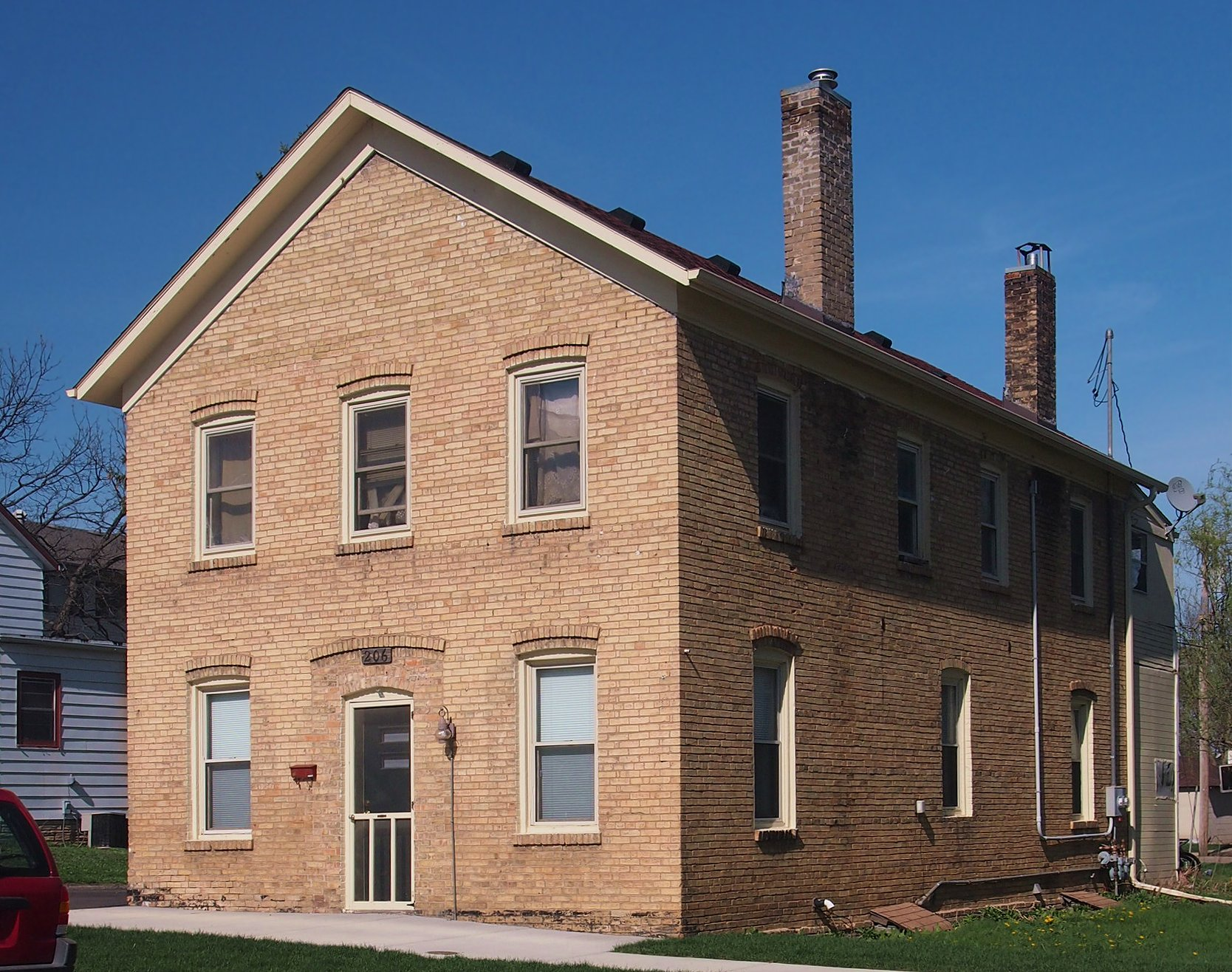
- The Frank Miesseler House within the district

- Location within Minnesota Location within the United States
- Location: Chaska, Minnesota
- Coordinates: 44°47′12″N 93°35′58″W
- Area: 17 acres (6.9 ha)
- Built: 1860–1920
- MPS: Carver County MRA
- NRHP reference No.: 80001973
- Added to NRHP: January 4, 1980

Walnut Street Historic District is a historic district in Chaska, Minnesota, United States, listed on the National Register of Historic Places. The district is roughly bounded by Walnut, Second, Chestnut, and Sixth Streets. It contains burial mounds representing the area's prehistory, and the buildings and structures in the district represent Chaska's period of commercial, industrial, religious, and residential development. Houses within this district include the Greek Revival style and other Neoclassical styles.

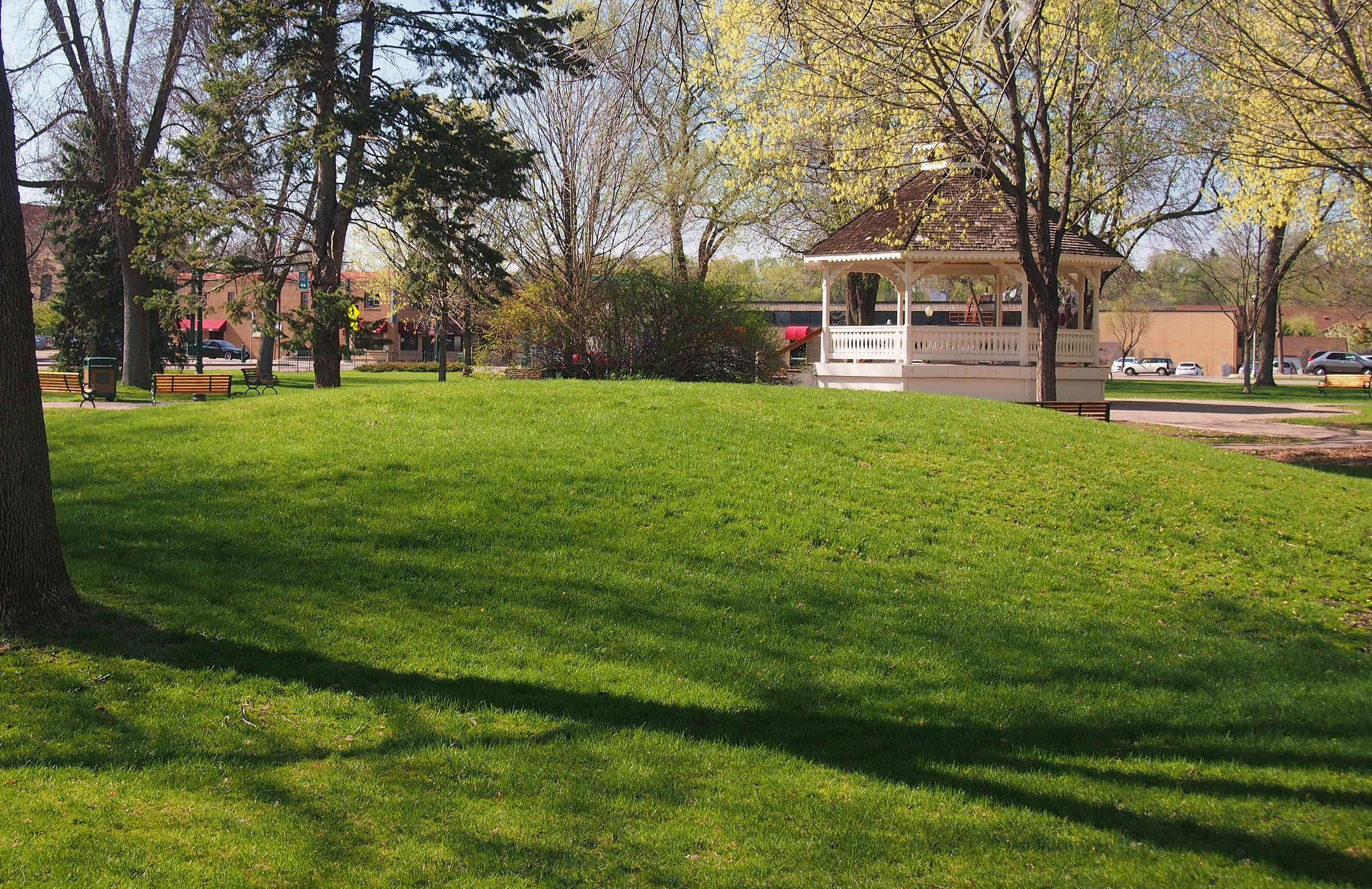
Public Square with precontact Native American burial mound

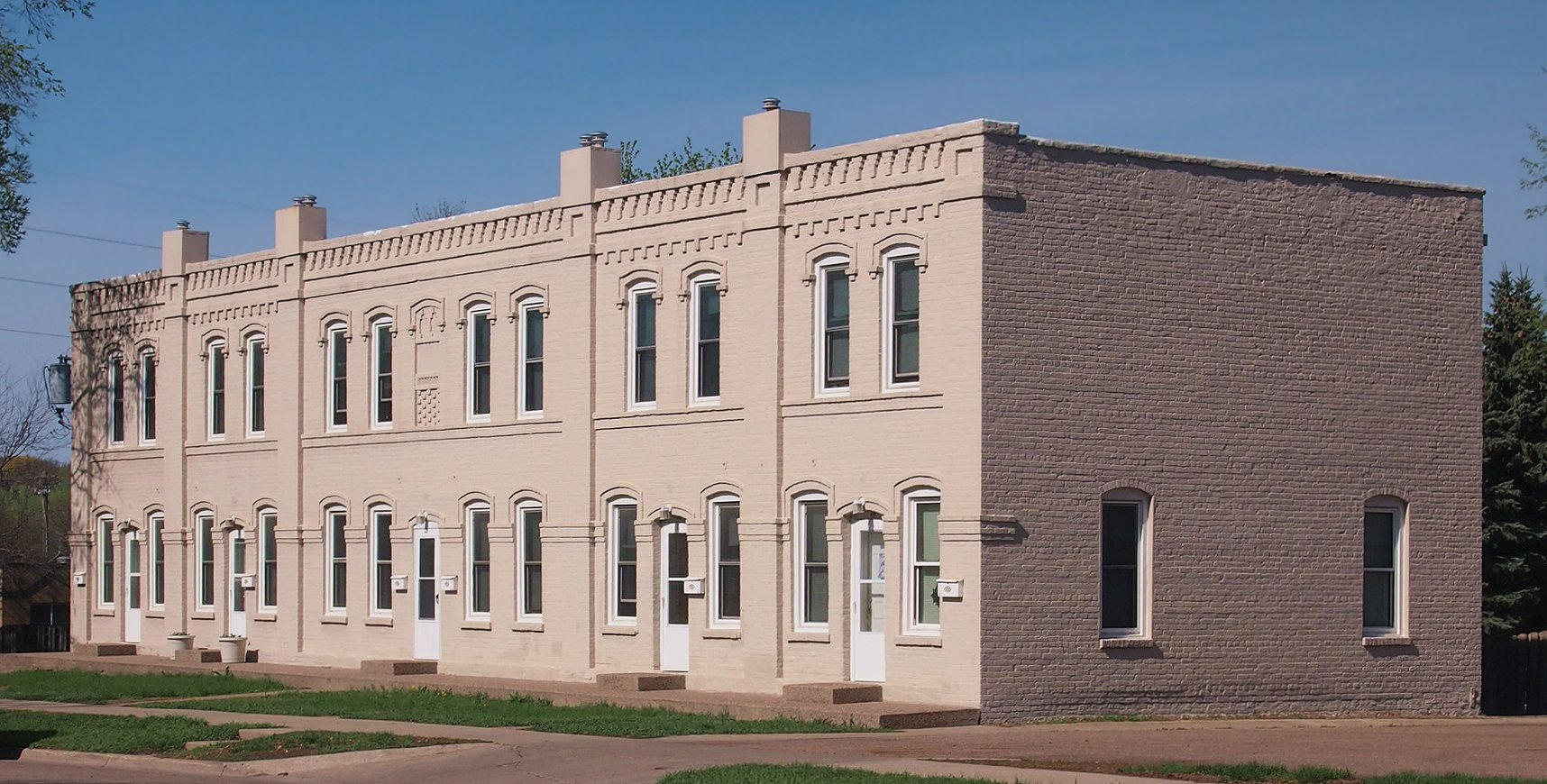
Tenement House built c. 1880

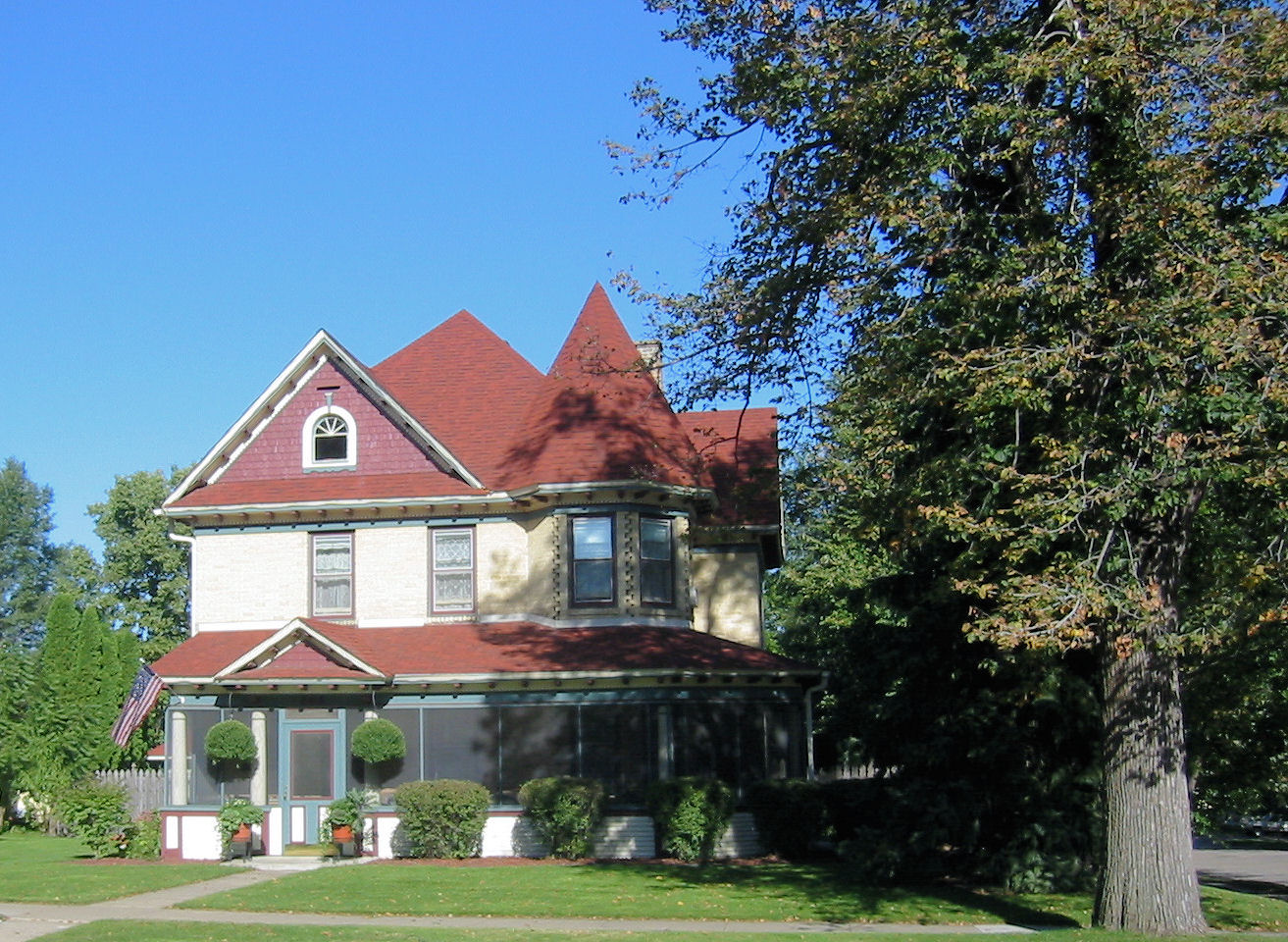
The K. K. Klammer House, built c. 1896

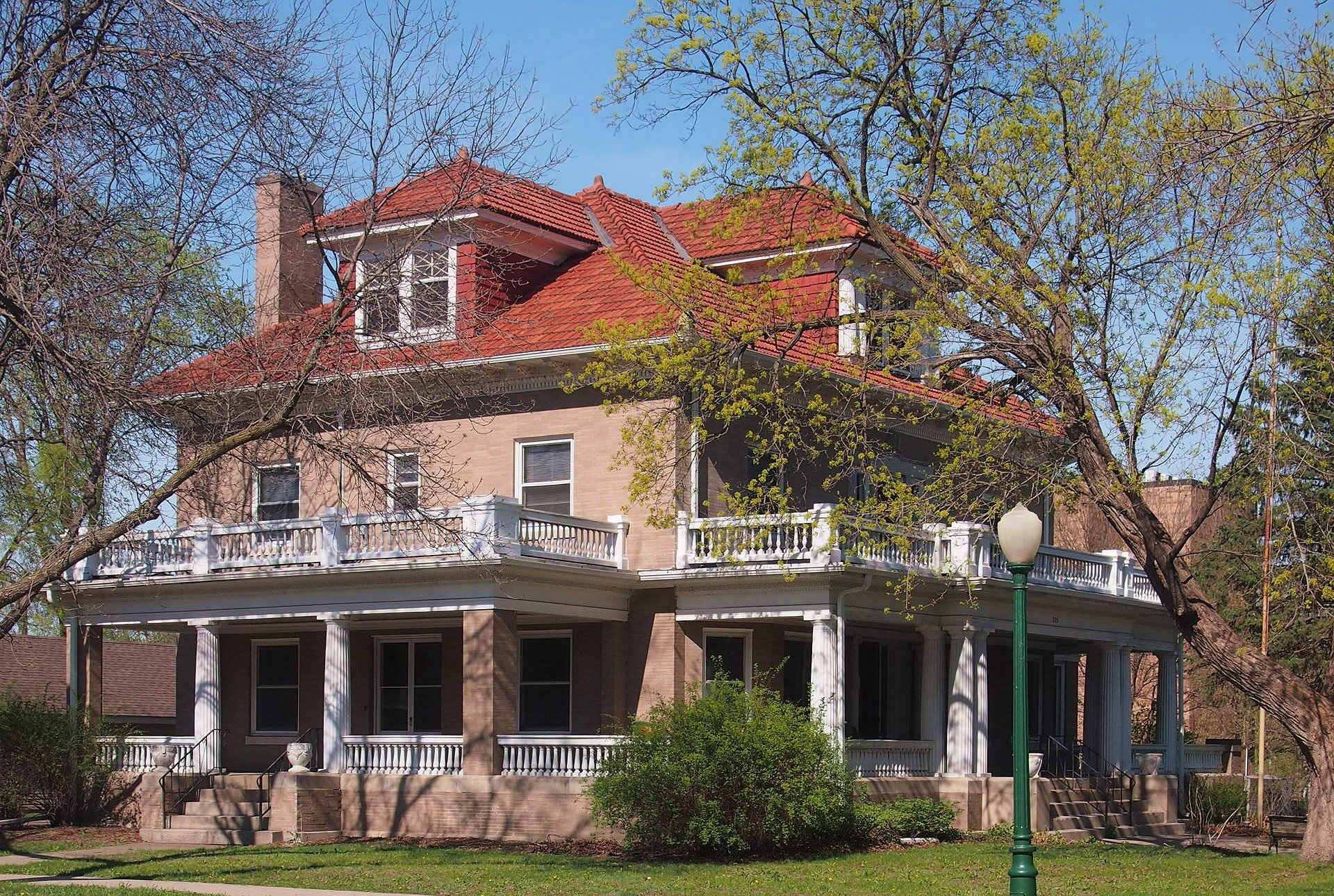
The Chris Klein House, built c. 1900
