= FSI International =

American manufacturing company

FSI International, Inc.
- Type: Subsidiary
- Traded as: Nasdaq: FSII
- Industry: Semiconductor Equipment & Testing
- Founded: 1973; 53 years ago
- Headquarters: Chaska, Minnesota, United States
- Products: surface conditioning technology solutions, microlithography system
- Website: www.tel.com/about/index.htm

FSI International, Inc. (FSI) is an American manufacturing company based in Chaska, Minnesota, that supplies processing equipment used to manufacture microelectronics, including semiconductor devices.

== History ==
The company's history began with the establishment of Fluoroware, Inc. in 1966, a company that made fixtures to hold the silicon wafers in place during the various processes involved in producing semiconductor devices. When asked to design a drying apparatus, the principals of Fluoroware agreed to do so and established FSI International in 1973 to market this new product.

The company's offerings expanded to meet the market need for equipment used in the fabrication of microelectronics. In the 1990s, the company relocated from its original facility overlooking Hazeltine Lake to a larger site nearby.

In 1999, FSI International announced an agreement to acquire YieldUP International Corp. In October 2012, Tokyo Electron acquired FSI International, Inc. and renamed the division TEL FSI.

== Products ==
FSI International supplied wafer cleaning equipment, using wet, cryogenic or other chemistry techniques. The company also sold microlithography systems using photoresist processes. The company provides upgrade, replacement and other support services. The five main series of equipment produced by the company are/were: ZETA, ORION, ANTARES, POLARIS, and up to late 2024, the MERCURY. In earlier years, the company also produced the SATURN, TITAN and NEPTUNE processing systems. In late 2024 the company sold the assets and manufacturing rights for the MERCURY to the company Shellback. Some of the products of the company are spray cleaning systems, single wafer cleaning systems, cryogenic processing systems, and immersion cleaning systems.
