= Sergio Zyman =

Advertising executive

- Born: July 30, 1945 (age 80); Mexico City, Mexico
- Occupation: Marketer
- Known for: Failed launch of New Coke; Eradication of Crystal Pepsi and Tab Clear; Founder of the Zyman Group; Founder of the Zyman Foundation
- Notable work: The End of Marketing as We Know It (2002)

Sergio Zyman (born July 30, 1945) is a marketing executive from Mexico best known as the marketer behind the failed launch of New Coke and the success of Diet Coke, Fruitopia, Surge, and ad campaigns such as "Coke Is It."

== Early life and education ==
Zyman was born to a Mexican Jewish family in Mexico City. He attended executive programs at Harvard University and graduate schools in London, Paris and Jerusalem though his professional resume does not list a graduate degree or MBA.

== Career ==
Zyman's work experience includes tenures with Coca-Cola, PepsiCo, and Procter & Gamble, and his own firm Zyman Group. He is also known for helping introduce Diet Coke in 1982 and conceiving Fruitopia in 1994.

After leaving the Coca-Cola Company, Zyman launched a consulting firm called the Zyman Group, which he sold to MDC Partners Inc., a Canadian advertising firm holding company, for around $60 million in April 2005. He was replaced there as Chairman by Scott Miller, formerly with McCann Erickson. The Zyman Group is no longer in business. Zyman later served as a director of Upstream Worldwide, the parent company of uSell.com, but he has been replaced there and is no longer on the Executive Team. He then worked with JC Penney as a Marketing Consultant but left after the failed re-positioning of the chain.

=== New Coke ===
A cover story in Fortune Magazine from May 1, 1995 referred to New Coke as the biggest marketing blunder since the launch of Ford's Edsel. New Coke was a reformulation of the original Coca-Cola flavor. After significant consumer opposition, the original flavor was reintroduced after 77 days. Fortune Magazine reported:

Zyman, then head of U.S. marketing, was coming off his enormously successful introduction of Diet Coke when he was assigned day-to-day responsibility for top-secret Project Kansas in 1984. The zealous Mexican insisted that Coca-Cola (or Co-Coola, as he pronounces it) must act boldly to reverse its 20-year market-share decline vs. Pepsi. Zyman, a former Pepsi marketer, argued that the correct strategy was to replace 98-year-old Coke with a better-tasting cola, label it New Coke," and blare the news--which is exactly what the company did. Zyman's greatest error was that he and his team failed to present the option of keeping old Coke on the market.

== Published works ==
Zyman has written four books on marketing and advertising, including:

- The End of Advertising as We Know It with Armin Brott. John Wiley & Sons, 2002
- The End of Marketing as We Know It
