= Soft soap =

Soft soap may refer to:

- a type of soap
- Softsoap, trade name of a liquid soap product
