= Nordic Mist =

Line of soft drink mixers

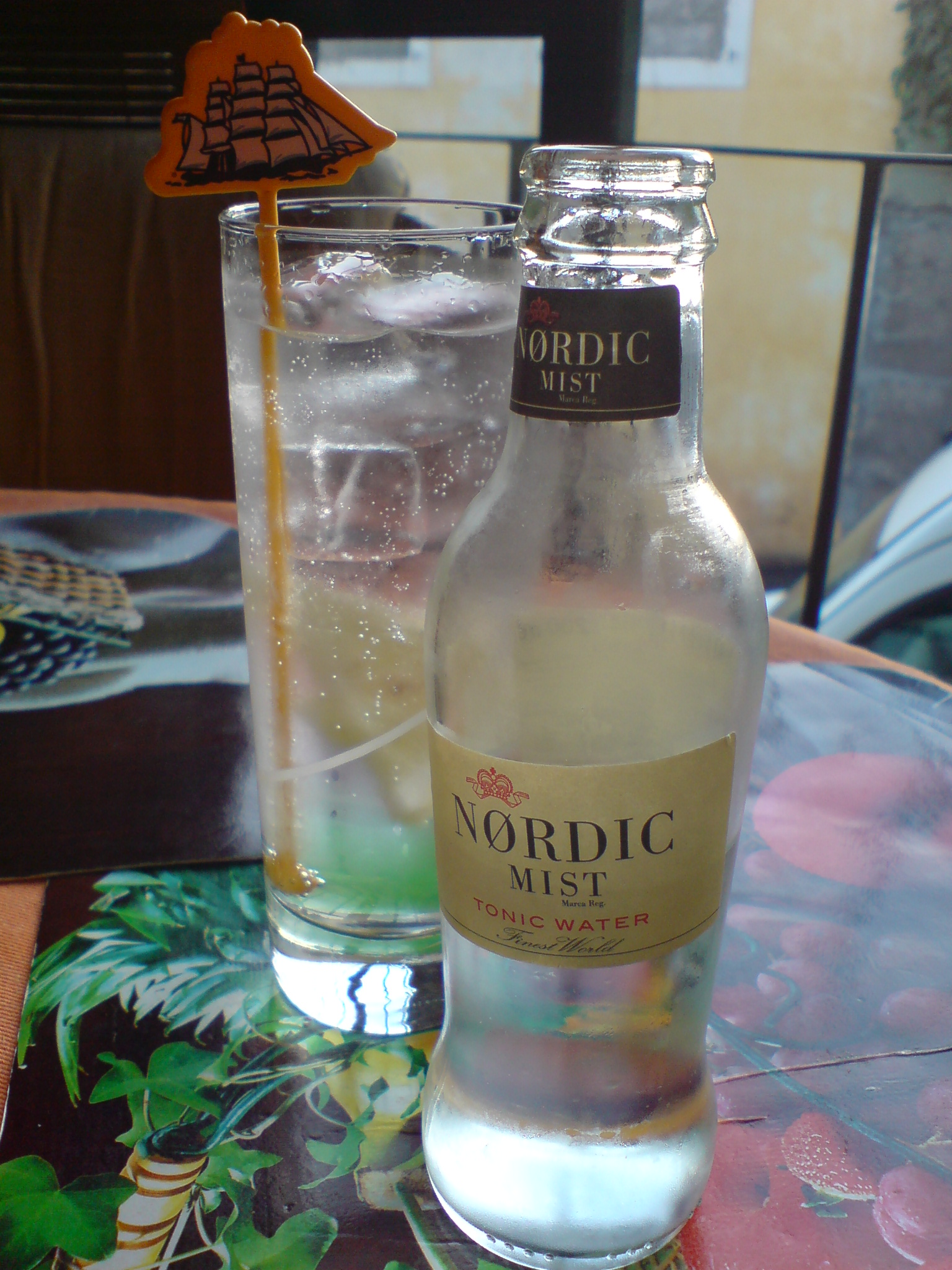
- Type: Drink mixer
- Manufacturer: Coca-Cola
- Origin: United States
- Introduced: 1992
- Related products: Clearly Canadian; Perrier

Nordic Mist (stylised as Nørdic Mist) is a line of soft drink mixers produced by The Coca-Cola Company and sold in Chile, Guinea-Bissau, Luxembourg, Belgium, Portugal, Israel and Spain.

== History ==
Nørdic Mist was introduced to New York City, Boston, Pittsburgh, and Philadelphia in September 1992. It was the result of a team working under Mary Minnick to develop beverages to compete in the growing low-carbohydrate, healthier soft drink market. Nørdic Mist was created more specifically to compete with Clearly Canadian, a brand of sparkling water quickly growing in popularity at the time. At its debut it was available in five flavors - black cherry, raspberry, peach, pineapple, and kiwi-pineapple-guava. Chile saw the arrival of Nørdic Mist in 1997, distributed there by Embotelladora Andina.

Nørdic Mist was introduced to Spain in 2000. In less than three years Coca-Cola enjoyed a 17% share of the tonic water market.

== Flavors ==
- Bitter Lemon
- Bitter Water
- Fruit Punch
- Ginger Ale
- Lemon
- Orange
- Tonic Water
- Agrumes

== Trivia ==
Nørdic Mist has achieved almost cult status as the best mixer for gin & tonic with various Facebook pages and blogs requesting its export to other countries where it is not currently available.

== See also ==
- Clearly Canadian
- Mistic
- Perrier
- Brand blunder
