= Tab Clear =

Soft drink

- Type: Diet clear cola
- Manufacturer: The Coca-Cola Company
- Origin: United States
- Introduced: 1992; 34 years ago
- Discontinued: 1994; 32 years ago
- Related products: Crystal Pepsi, Tab, Coca-Cola Clear, White Coke, Zevia

Tab Clear is a variation of the Tab soft drink. It is Coca-Cola's contribution to the short-lived "clear cola" movement during the early 1990s.

Tab Clear was introduced in the United States on December 14, 1992 to initially positive results, and was also marketed in Britain a month later, in Japan in March 1993 and in Australia in April 1993. Tab Clear was discontinued after only a short time of marketing in 1994. Unlike most other "clear" soft drinks, Tab Clear contained caffeine and, according to the company, had the flavor of cola.

== Background ==
After PepsiCo's introduction of Crystal Pepsi in mid-1992, Coca-Cola decided to follow suit with its own clear cola, Tab Clear, at the end of the year.

In late December 1992, Coca-Cola Co. president Doug Ivester told a gathering of New York reporters that Tab Clear was being positioned as part of the "mainstream of diet soft drinks" and was "not a new-age beverage". He declared:

Consumers want an alternative new soft drink with a lot of flavor. A new-age label would doom it. It would be aiming too low to go up against Crystal Pepsi and Clearly Canadian.

== Production and marketing ==
After positive consumer response in its initial 10 markets, it was announced on February 17, 1993, that Tab Clear would be introduced into an additional 20 American markets the coming March, increasing the drink's availability to 35 percent of the American population. In an article from the Los Angeles Times, it was reported that Coca-Cola expected to have Tab Clear available nationwide by the end of the year. Despite the positive results, an article published in March that year reported "one oddity about the new Tab Clear: it is only sold in cans. You would think that would eliminate one of the pop's strongest selling points--its clearness."

=== International introductions ===
Tab Clear went international only two weeks after its introduction in the United States. The clear cola with "a mouthful of flavor" was introduced at a news conference in London on January 18, 1993. The product was made available to the British public from early February that year with a trial price of 23 pence, initially in 330 ml cans and later in 1.5 and 2 litre plastic bottles. The drink was referred to as "a completely new idea in soft drinks and is unlike any other product available". This made Coca-Cola the first of the two rival US soft drink global brands (Coke and Pepsi) to launch a clear cola in Europe.

In early February that year, The Coca-Cola Company announced plans to introduce Tab Clear into Japan, scheduling a public introduction for mid-March. Japan became the third country to be introduced to Tab Clear. On the 1st of April, The Coca-Cola Company launched Tab Clear in Australia as well. In Australia, the product was a major failure. Despite a large marketing effort from the Australian arm of the company, Tab Clear sales peaked at only 1% in the month of June and declined to just 0.1% by October, by which time it was decided to discontinue the drink.

=== Ad campaigns ===
In both the US and in Britain, Coca-Cola launched a heavy ad campaign for TaB clear with Chain of Mystery and Sinister Connections, linking TaB Clear with unintentionally being the cause of various historical events with the slogan "Suddenly everything is clear". Several radio ads were created as well, such as an ad about TaB Clear being an "eternal paradox" and an ad where "Drink TaB Clear" is discovered when a song is played backwards. In Australia, TV commercials were fronted by the popular personality Bert Newton. A very different ad campaign was created in Japan with ads mostly unrelated to each other and either featuring or voiced over by a Japanese spokesman.

TaB Clear commercials were played often, sometimes twice within a short break, proof of Coca-Cola's attempt to generate quick attention for the soft drink.

== Legacy ==
In July 2004, a BBC Business News article referred to how "colourless versions" of Coke "have not been hugely successful". Some have even referred to Tab Clear's marketing as a "born to die" campaign.

In his 2011 book, Killing Giants: 10 Strategies to Topple the Goliath in Your Industry, Stephen Denny published an interview with former Coca-Cola Chief Marketing Officer Sergio Zyman that stated the formation and subsequent failure of Tab Clear was a deliberate move to destroy Crystal Pepsi, capitalizing on the public's lack of understanding of Pepsi's heavily marketed product. Tab Clear was marketed as a diet drink, which were less popular than traditional colas, and the Tab brand in general was seen as an inferior product to flagships like Coca-Cola or Pepsi. With Tab Clear being placed in such close proximity to Crystal Pepsi, the image of both brands would be damaged in what Zyman called a "kamikaze" strategy. "This is like a cola," Zyman explained, "but it doesn't have any color. It has all this great taste. And we said, 'No, Crystal Pepsi is actually a diet drink.' Even though it wasn't. Because Tab had the attributes of diet, which was its demise. That was its problem. It was perceived to be a medicinal drink. Within three or five months, Tab Clear was dead. And so was Crystal Pepsi."

== See also ==
- List of defunct consumer brands
