= Cocacolonization =

American culture globalization through products

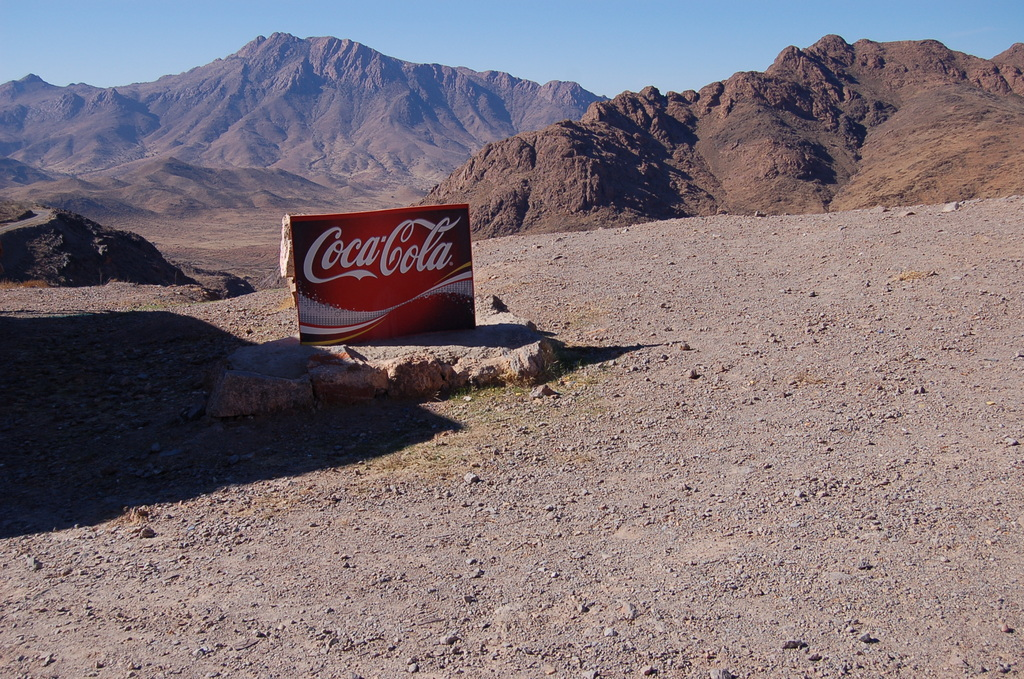
Coca-Cola advertising in the High Atlas mountains of Morocco

Cocacolonization (alternatively coca-colonization) refers to the globalization of American culture (also referred to as Americanization) pushed through popular American products such as the soft-drink brand Coca-Cola. The term is a portmanteau of the name of the multinational soft-drink maker and "colonization".

The term was first documented in 1949 in Australia and in France, where the French Communist Party strongly opposed the further expansion of Coca-Cola. In 1948, the French finance ministry stood against "Coke" on the grounds that its operation would bring no capital to help with French recovery, and was likely to drain profits back to the parent company in the United States. The French Communist Party also warned that the Coke distribution-system would double as an espionage network.

In World War II (1939-1945) and the Cold War (1947-1991), many outside of the United States associated Coca-Cola with American culture. Seeing ties to the culture of the United States, some Europeans rejected perceived attempts to cocacolonize their countries, objecting to what they saw as an invasion of their nationalistic identities. Europeans saw Coca-Cola not just as a carbonated refreshment, but as bottled America. By the end of the Cold War, American ideals were spread across the world by Coke and in certain cases, used to combat Communism.

Cocacolonization as a historical concept gained visibility in the Americanization debate in Europe with the 1994 publication of Reinhold Wagnleitner's book Coca-Colonization and the Cold War: The Cultural Mission of the United States in Austria After the Second World War. Wagnleitner used "Coca-Colonization" to embody the premise of his book: the United States of America attempted cultural imperialism by expanding American ideals through the spread of consumer goods such as Coca-Cola and Levi jeans, and through cultural symbols like rock and roll and Marlon Brando's black leather jacket, as well as through the promotion of democracy in Europe.

The expression "coca-colonization" also appears in medical literature to describe the lifestyle changes and the associated increase of incidence of characteristic chronic diseases, e.g. type 2 diabetes.

== History ==
The concept of Cocacolonization began at the beginning of World War II. Over time, some countries resisted the American soft drink while others openly accepted it. To all, it represented America and its culture and at a majority of major historical events during the 20th century, Coke was in attendance.

=== World War II ===
When war broke out and American troops were sent overseas, the Coca-Cola company vowed that any American in uniform should be able to get a Coke for five cents wherever they were. As a result, the company built bottling stations in the Pacific and on the Western front.

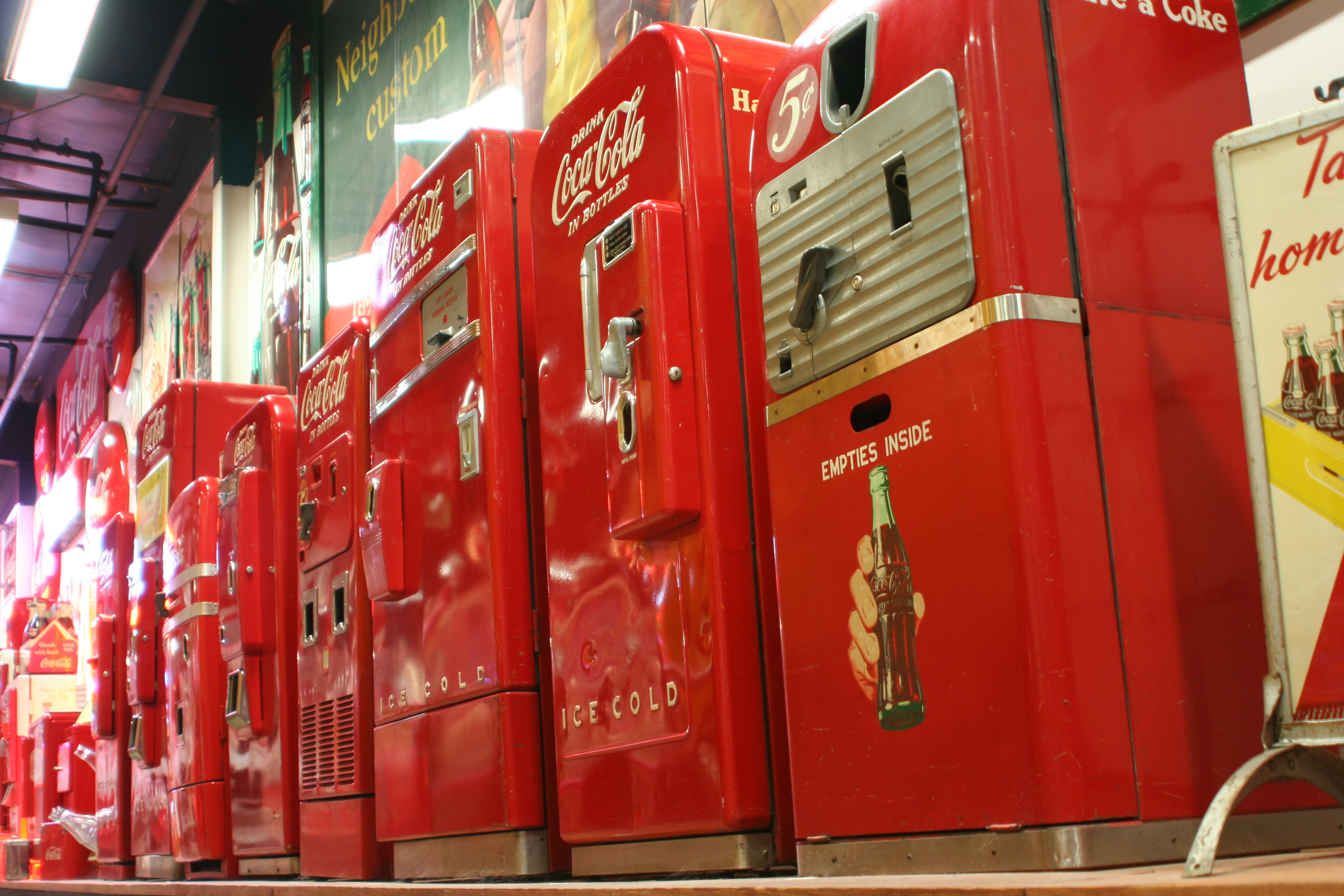
Vintage Coca-Cola vending machines from World War II. They resemble the machines spread out throughout the Pacific front.

Nazis recognized Coke to be a "Jewish-American" drink. In response, the regime only allowed Coke in the country if it displayed a swastika on the bottle, which it did. In the Soviet Union, war hero Marshal Georgi Zhukov loved the drink, but Soviet leader Joseph Stalin viewed it as a symbol of American imperialism and forbade its consumption. As a solution, Coca-Cola developed a clear version of the drink bottled with a white cap and red star as a disguise to allow Zhukov to consume Cola without suspicion. It would look like Vodka.

On the Pacific front of the war, Coke had a tough time reaching the troops. To address the issue, the company created portable soda fountains that were distributed throughout the islands on the Pacific Ocean. Asian countries experienced Coca-Cola. According to the company, the drink spread throughout the islands because, "Coke symbolized the American way of life."

Throughout the war, Coke dispersed ads for their soda all over the world. The majority of the ads displayed an American soldier drinking a soda with the natives of that country. If the ad was in a country outside of the United States, it was written in the native language of that country. Popular ads had positive images of Americans with Coke in New Zealand, Russia, the Philippines, Newfoundland, Italy, England, and in Poland. According to Coca-Cola, "From the jungles of the Admiral Islands to the officer clubs in the Riviera," Coke and America was there.

=== Late 1940s and the Cold War ===
The end of World War II marked up by widespread cocacolonization of Europe and Asia. In 1947, Coca-Cola bottling operations began in the Netherlands, Belgium, and Luxembourg; then Switzerland, Italy, and France by 1949. Author Mark Gordon said, "American ideals were now being pushed on Europeans every time they sipped a bottle of Coke." By the early 1950s, there were 63 bottling plants expanding across three continents including the countries of: Egypt, Iceland, Iran, West Africa, and New Guinea. Many US companies benefitted from expansion into Europe, including Coca-Cola. Through these foreign endeavours, the US was able to informally create a business and corporate empire via the expansion of several US companies.

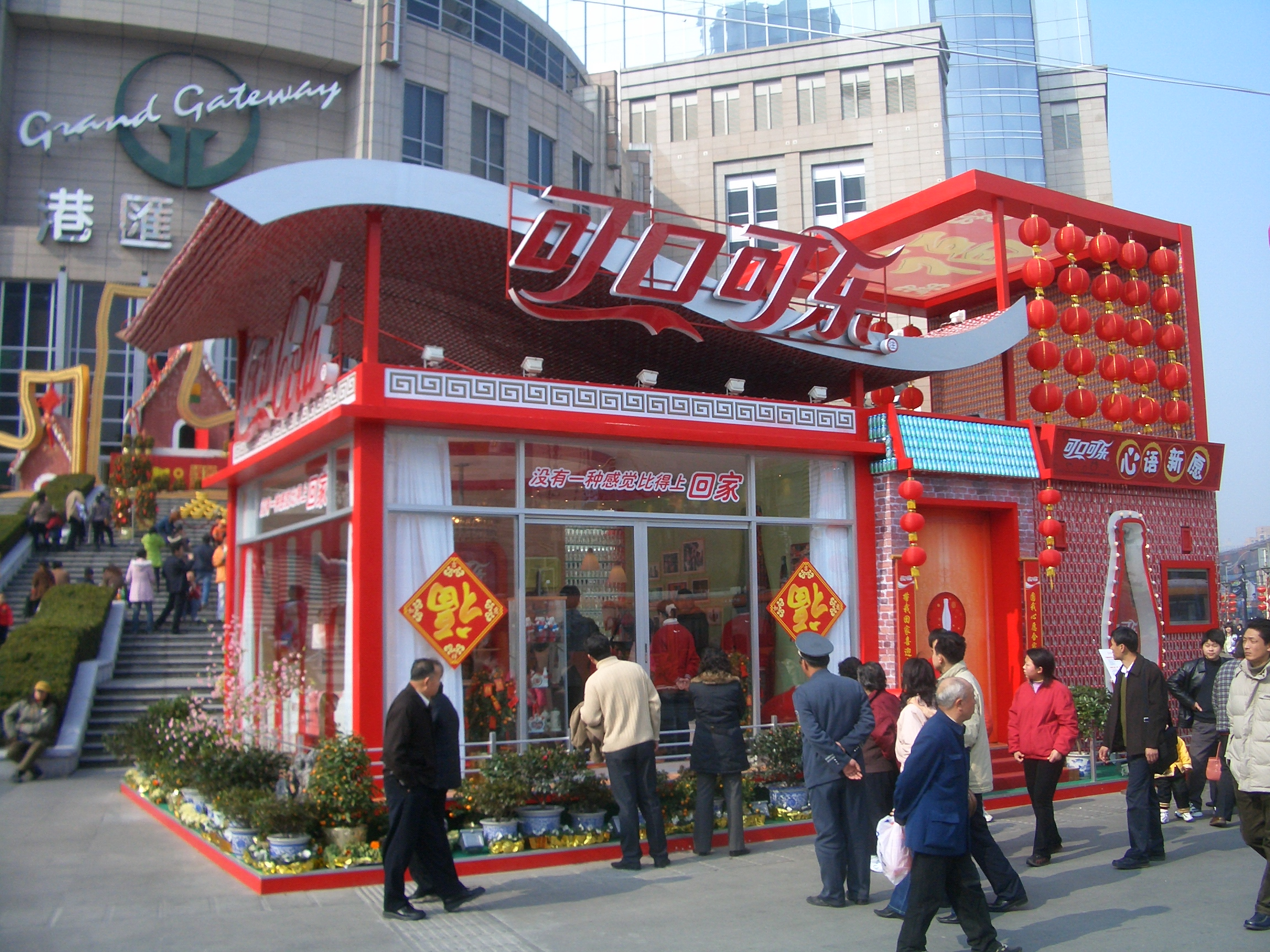
The Coca-Cola store in China helping to celebrate the New Year

By the time of the Cold War, Coke met resistance in some countries. Italians kept from indulging in the soda. Austrians recognized the expansion of the company as an attempt to spread American culture and ideals overseas. In France, French communists spread awareness about Coca-Cola. They coined the term cocacolonization because they saw the spread of Coke in their country as an attempt to make it an American colony. When the company attempted to open a bottling plant in the country, French Communists threatened to barricade Paris to keep Coke out. To the French, the company represented capitalist America.

At the fall of the Berlin Wall, the end of Communism in Germany in November 1989, Coca-Cola handed out sodas.

== Significance ==
=== Health factors ===
Medical experts use the term cocacolonization in their medical journals representing the spread of unhealthy American foods overseas.

A significant shift in nutrition has occurred. Developed nations export processed foods that are high in trans fats and refined sugar to developing nations, causing a change from previous methods of survival such as hunting and gathering.

Cocacolonization has been linked to the spike in Type 2 diabetes, obesity, and increased risk for cardiovascular diseases because of the connection between economic situation and low costs of high fat, high sugar foods.

Due to an increase in tourism in their area, the Mayan tribe in the Yucatán Peninsula experienced a decline in health because they were introduced to unhealthy American foods. They became increasingly dependent on the foods. Similarly, the Tz'utujill tribe in Guatemala was also introduced to the same food and encountered the same decline in health. Worldwide, type 2 diabetes spread and steadily increased over the next 20 years. The explanation for their decline in health was cocacolonization.

=== Widespread ===
As of 2015, Coca-Cola has been distributed to over 200 countries worldwide. A few of the many countries consist of China, Guatemala, Papua New Guinea, Mexico, Russia, Canada, United Kingdom, Algeria, and Libya. According to the company, "Coca-Cola is the second-most understood term in the world behind "okay."

Coca-Cola as a product has stretched across international borders to create a brand. “In much political, academic and conversational rhetoric the term Coca-Cola comes to stand, not just for a particular soft drink, but also for the problematic nature of commodities in general. It is a meta-commodity. … It may stand for commodities or capitalism, but equally Imperialism or Americanization.” Cocacolonization as referring to the spread of American culture and/or brands; Coca-Cola is an example of the widespread infrastructure of westernized capitalism and consumerism. There have been several notable pushbacks against Cocacolonization. In 2012, Bolivia's Foreign Minister David Choquehuanca (alongside President Evo Morales) unsuccessfully tried to place a ban on Coca-Cola in a move against Western imperialism and capitalism.

Coca-Cola operates via franchises; therefore, for areas to benefit from its production, local bottling plants are required. Trinidad obtained the franchise in 1939. In Trinidad, Coke was bottled by Cannings Foods Limited.

In Trinidad, sweet drinks are not viewed as luxury items, but instead as everyday items of the common man. In relation to Coca-Cola, “the centrality of the black sweet drink to Trinidadian drinking is above all summed up in the notion of a “rum and Coke” as the core alcoholic drink for most people of the island.”

== See also ==
- Cultural globalization
- Cultural imperialism
- Disneyfication
- McDonaldization
- McWorld
- Walmarting
