= Orbitz (drink) =

Soft drink with edible spheres in suspension

- Type: Soft drink
- Manufacturer: The Clearly Food & Beverage Company
- Origin: Canada
- Introduced: 1997
- Discontinued: 1999
- Related products: Clearly Canadian

Orbitz was a non-carbonated fruit-flavored beverage produced by The Clearly Food & Beverage Company of Canada, makers of Clearly Canadian, in the late 1990s. The drink was sold in five flavors, and made with small floating edible fruit-flavored jelly beads. Orbitz was marketed as a "texturally enhanced alternative beverage" but some consumers compared it to a potable lava lamp.

== History ==
It was introduced in 1997 and marketed as a “scientific marvel”. It was discontinued by early 1999.

=== Post-discontinuation ===
The product's domain name was bought by the Internet-based travel agency named Orbitz.

Unopened bottles from the drink's original launch have become a collector's item, appearing on online auction websites worth $30-$50 on online sales. The Clearly Food & Beverage Company states that the proprietary equipment that made Orbitz broke down and the trademark is no longer owned by the company.

== Ingredients ==
The small balls floated due to their nearly equal density to the surrounding liquid, and remained suspended with the assistance of gellan gum. The gellan gum provided a support matrix and had a visual clarity approaching that of water, which increased with the addition of sugar. The gellan gum created a very weak yield stress which has been measured to be ~0.04 Pa.

== Flavors ==
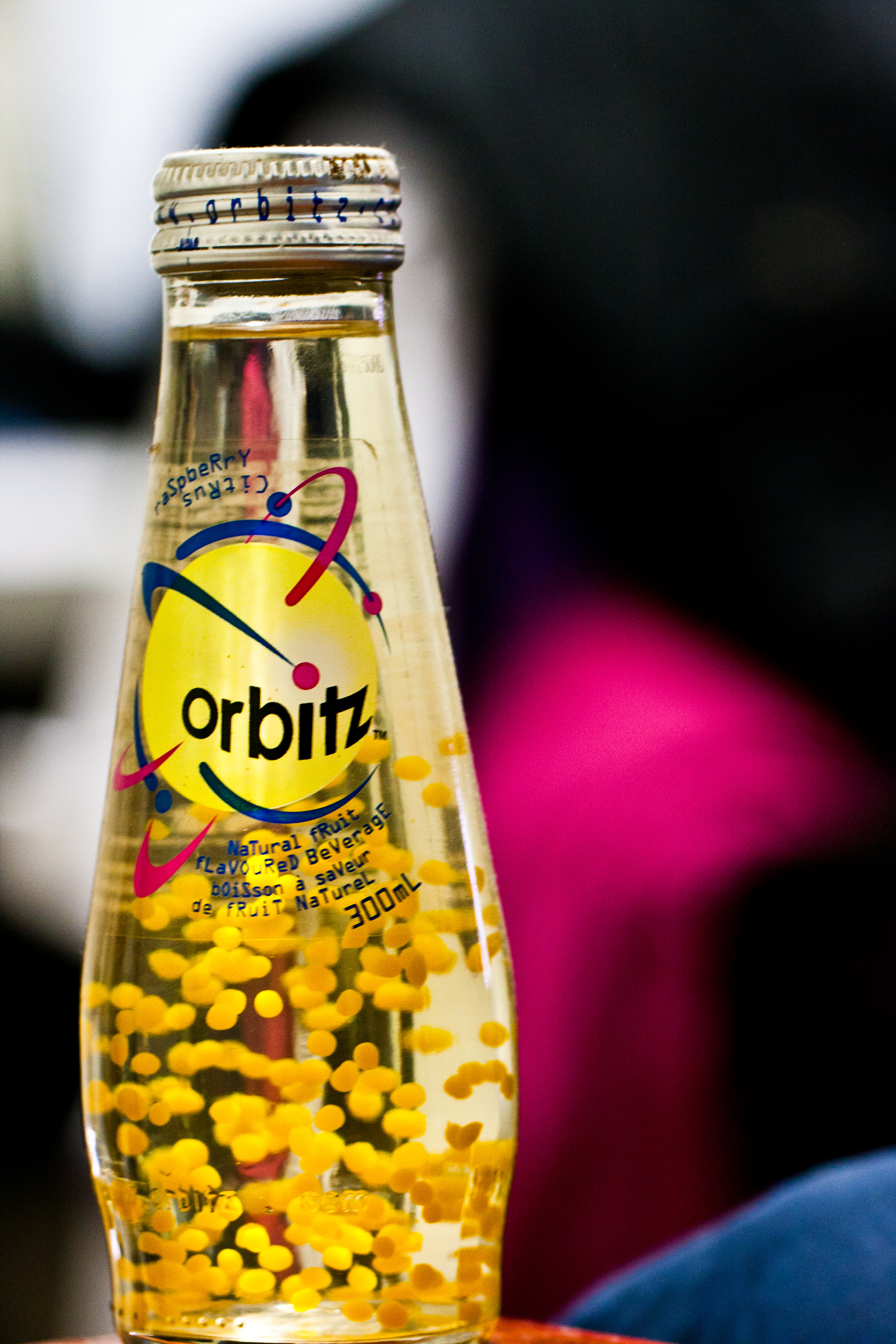
Bottle of Orbitz

Several flavors of Orbitz were produced:

- Raspberry Citrus
- Blueberry Melon Strawberry
- Pineapple Banana Cherry Coconut
- Vanilla Orange
- Black Currant Berry

== In popular culture ==
The drink is seen in the 1999 Gregg Araki film Splendor, in which Kelly MacDonald's character opens a fridge full of Orbitz and drinks one.

The drink is featured as a plot device in the 2025 film Nirvanna the Band the Show the Movie, as an element necessary for the function of a time machine, but which is not readily available in the present.

== See also ==
- Bubble tea
- List of defunct consumer brands
