= Oetinger =

Oetinger is a surname. Notable people with the surname include:

- Ferdinand Christoph Oetinger (1719–1772), German physician
- Friedrich Christoph Oetinger (1702–1782), German Lutheran theologian and theosopher

== See also ==
- Oettinger (disambiguation)
