= Chasca =

Chasca may refer to:

- Chasca (Salvadoran folklore), fictional character in Salvadoran folklore
- Chasca Coyllur or Ch'aska Quyllur, goddess in Inca mythology
- Chasca, a character in 2020 video game Genshin Impact
- Chasca, a regional term for esquites

== See also ==
- Chaska (disambiguation)
