= Coca-Cola Clear =

Colorless variant of Coca-Cola

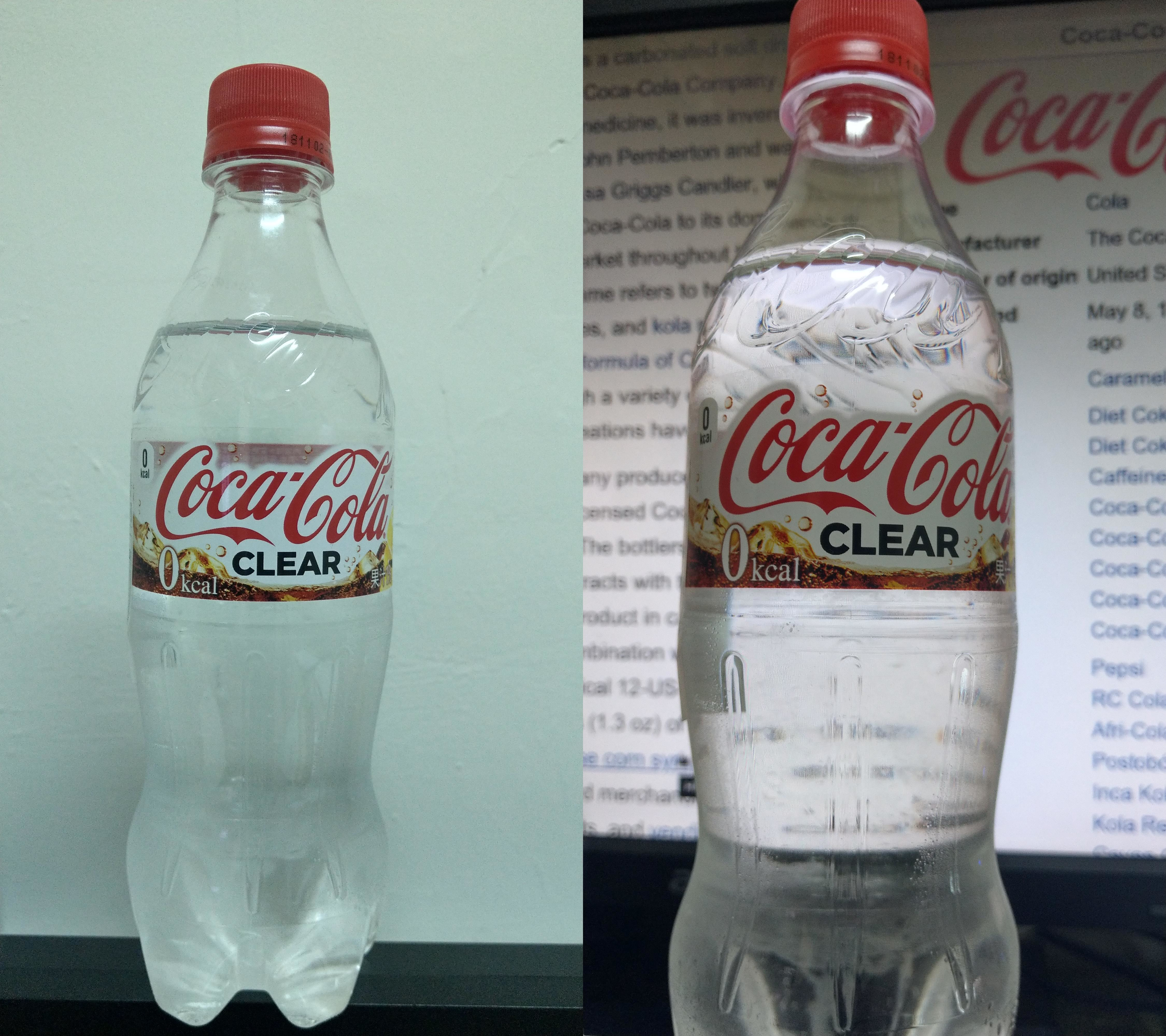
- Type: Clear cola
- Manufacturer: The Coca-Cola Company
- Origin: Japan
- Introduced: June 2018; 8 years ago
- Related products: White Coke, Sprite

Coca-Cola Clear is a colorless variant of the soft drink Coca-Cola. Without the normal caramel ingredient, Coca-Cola Clear has none of the typical dark Coke color. The drink is lemon-flavored to compensate for the removed caramel. It was developed at Coca-Cola Asia Pacific and launched locally in Japan in June 2018. A lime-flavored variation was released on June 10, 2019, known as Coca-Cola Clear Lime. Unlike regular Coca-Cola Clear, which is sweetened with both sucralose and acesulfame potassium, Coca-Cola Clear Lime is instead sweetened with high-fructose corn syrup. The product was then discontinued in 2020 after the promotion season ended.

== Production and distribution ==
Coca-Cola Clear is officially available in Japan, but is also available in Taiwan, China, and Singapore through specialty import outlets.

== See also ==
- Crystal Pepsi
- White Coke
- Tab Clear
