= Köstinger =

Köstinger is a German language surname. Notable people with the surname include:

- Elisabeth Köstinger (born 1978), Austrian politician
- Hubert Köstinger (1914–1975), Austrian skier
- Willy Köstinger (1940–2014), Austrian skier

== See also ==
- Ottinger
