= White Coke =

Nickname for a clear variant of Coca-Cola from the 1940s

- Product type: Clear cola
- Current owner: The Coca-Cola Company
- Country: Soviet Union
- Introduced: 1946
- Discontinued: 1946; 80 years ago
- Related brands: Coca-Cola Clear
- Markets: Soviet Union

White Coke (Russian: Бесцветная кока-кола, romanized: Bestsvetnaya koka-kola, lit. 'colorless Coca-Cola') was a clear variant of Coca-Cola produced in the 1940s at the request of Marshal of the Soviet Union Georgy Zhukov. It had the same flavor as the original, but changed by the absence of caramel coloring.

== History ==
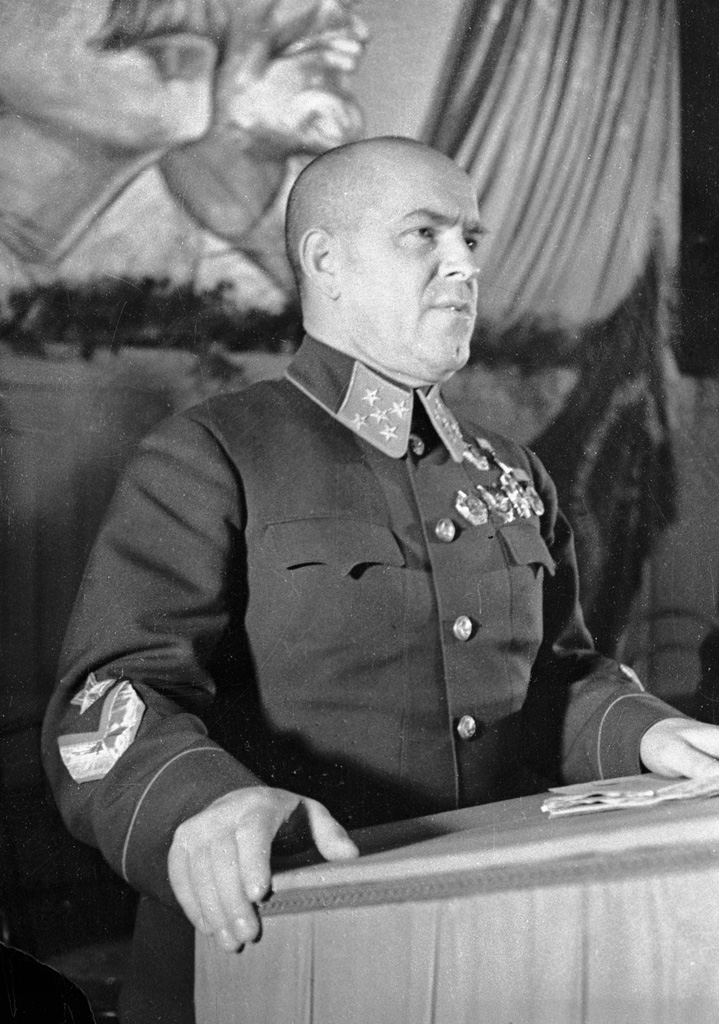
Marshal Zhukov (shown here in 1941 with a General's insignia) reportedly requested the manufacture of a colorless, unlabeled variant of Coca-Cola, known later as "White Coke"

Zhukov was introduced to Coca-Cola during, or shortly after, World War II by his counterpart in Western Europe, Dwight D. Eisenhower, who was also a fan of the drink. As Coca-Cola was regarded in the Soviet Union as a symbol of American imperialism, Zhukov was apparently reluctant to be photographed with or reported as consuming such a product. According to journalist Tom Standage, without corroborating sources, Zhukov later asked whether Coca-Cola could be manufactured and packaged to resemble vodka.

Marshal Zhukov reportedly made this inquiry through General Mark W. Clark, commander of the US sector of Allied-occupied Austria, who passed the request on to US President Harry S. Truman. The President's staff contacted James Farley, chairman of the Board of the Coca-Cola Export Corporation. At the time, Farley was overseeing the establishment of 38 Coca-Cola plants in Southeast Europe, including Austria. Farley delegated Zhukov's special order to Mladin Zarubica, a technical supervisor for the Coca-Cola Company. (Note: Mladin Zarubica was the a son of an immigrant to the US from Yugoslavia, and had been a wartime PT boat commander.) He had been sent to Austria in 1946 to supervise establishment of a large bottling plant. Zarubica received a charge of Coca-Cola base ingredients without the coloring.

The colorless version of Coca-Cola was bottled using straight, clear glass bottles with a white cap and a red star in the middle. The bottle and the cap were produced by a Crown Cork and Seal Company satellite in Brussels. The first shipment of White Coke consisted of 50 cases.

One beneficial consequence for the Coca-Cola Company was a relaxation of the regulations imposed by the occupying powers in Austria at the time. Coca-Cola supplies and products were required to transit a Soviet occupation zone while being transported between the Lambach bottling plant and the Vienna warehouse. While all goods entering the Soviet zone normally took weeks to be cleared by authorities, Coca-Cola shipments were never stopped.

== See also ==
- Coca-Cola Clear
- Crystal Pepsi
- Tab Clear
- Afri Cola
