= Chaska, Minnesota =

City in Minnesota, United States

Chaska
- City
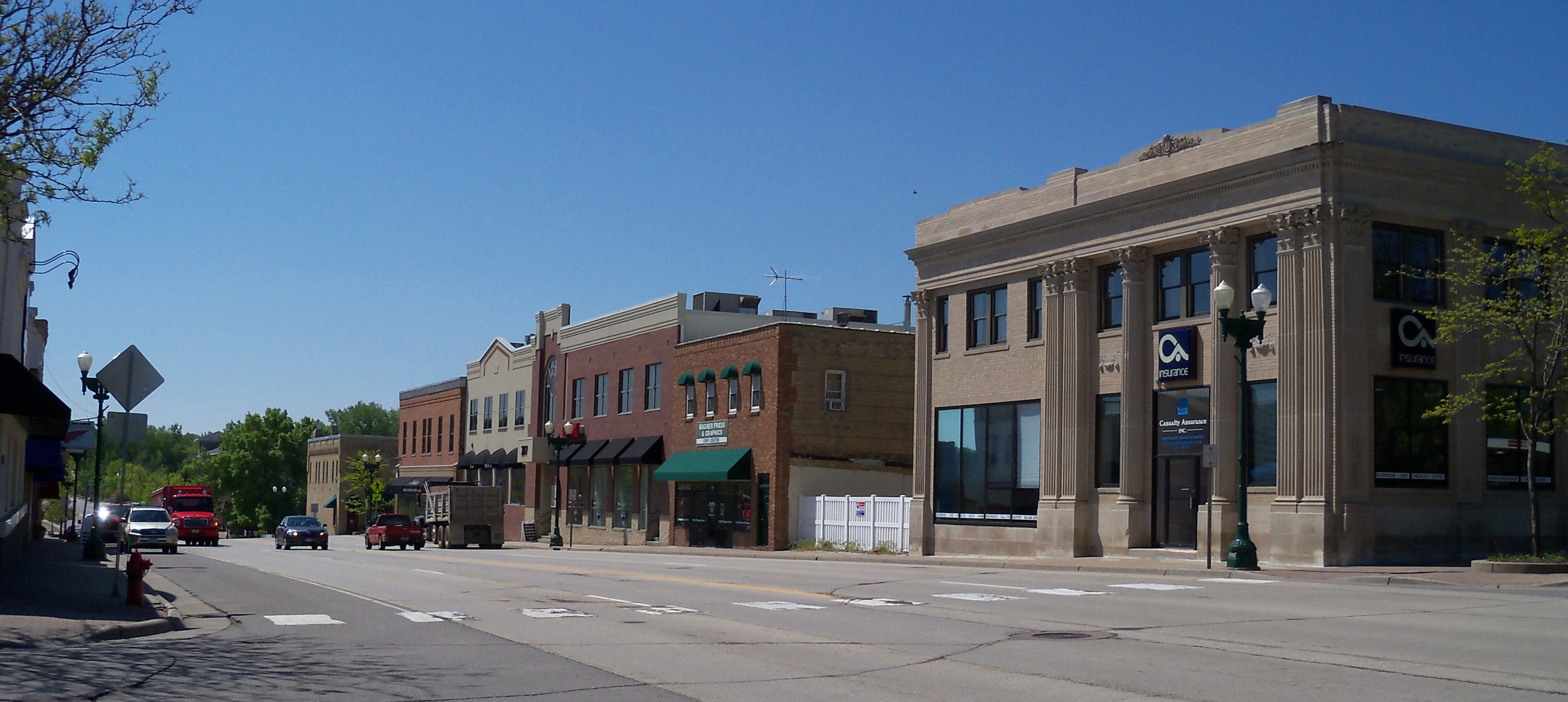
- Buildings in downtown Chaska

- Flag Seal
- Motto: "A Quality Small Town"
- Location in Carver County, Minnesota
- Coordinates: 44°49′00″N 93°37′00″W
- Country: United States
- State: Minnesota
- County: Carver
- Incorporated (village): 1871
- Incorporated (city): 1891

Government
  - Mayor: Taylor Hubbard

Area
  - Total: 17.84 sq mi (46.20 km^{2})
  - Land: 17.02 sq mi (44.09 km^{2})
  - Water: 0.81 sq mi (2.11 km^{2})
- Elevation: 919 ft (280 m)

Population (2020)
  - Total: 27,810
  - Estimate (2022): 28,262
  - Density: 1,634/sq mi (630.7/km^{2})
- Time zone: UTC-6 (Central)
  - Summer (DST): UTC-5 (CDT)
- ZIP Code: 55318
- Area code: 952
- FIPS code: 27-10972
- GNIS feature ID: 2393809
- Website: chaskamn.gov

Chaska (/ˈtʃæskə/ CHASS-kə) is a city in and the county seat of Carver County, Minnesota, United States. The population was 27,810 at the 2020 census. An outer ring suburb of the Twin Cities located 21 miles (34 km) southwest of Minneapolis, Chaska is home to the Hazeltine National Golf Club, which has hosted two PGA Championships and the Ryder Cup. The City of Chaska merged with Chaska Township in 2006.

== Etymology ==
The name "Chaska" is an anglicization of the Dakota word čhaské, which means "first-born son." It is commonly given as a name to oldest sons in Dakota communities.

== History ==
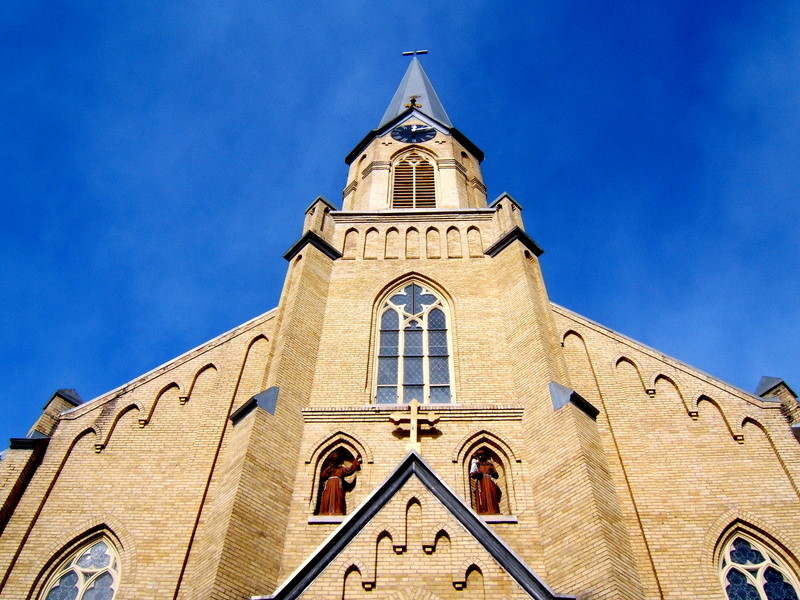
Guardian Angels Catholic Church in Chaska was built with the characteristic yellow Chaska brick.

Chaska's history reflects the influence of the Native American culture. The first inhabitants are believed to be the Mound Builders, whose ancient communities are marked by mounds in City Square. Later, the Dakota (also commonly known as the Sioux) were the primary nation in this region known as the Big Woods. Although the Indian mounds located in Chaska City Square indicate the immediate area was inhabited years before 1769, the year Chaska's recorded history began.

In 1776, Jonathan Carver explored the lands along the Minnesota River and chronicled his journeys. French Canadian fur traders traveled the waterways, trading with the Dakota in the early 19th century. During this time, Jean-Baptiste Faribault established a trading post in Chaska.

In 1851, the Treaty of Traverse des Sioux officially opened Little Rapids, as Chaska was then known, to settlement. Soon after, speculators moved into the new territory. Among the earliest was Thomas Andrew Holmes who, in August 1851, claimed a 20-acre (81,000 m^{2}) clearing as the Chaska townsite.

The name "Chaska" is derived from a Dakota word often given as a name to the first born male child. Records show that David L. Fuller purchased the "Shaska" townsite from Holmes in 1852. In 1857, the townsite was platted by the Shaska Company. In the same year, construction began on the original Carver County Courthouse located where the post office and KleinBank now stand in downtown Chaska. Chaska was incorporated as a village in 1871 and, by special legislative charter, as a city in 1891.

An abundance of high quality clay led to the start of brick making in 1857. By the 1880s, as a result of the clay resources, Chaska was a thriving brick manufacturing center. Bricks were shipped by boat to Saint Paul and, although the city grew as a result of steamboat trade, it was not until the Minneapolis and St. Louis Railway was built through town in 1873 that rapid expansion began.

With the advent of the 20th century came other industries, including the processing of beet sugar and other agricultural products; flour making, butter making, the canning of peas, corn, and tomatoes, and the curing of sauerkraut and pickles.

National polls named Chaska the eighth-best city in the United States in 2007 and 20th best in 2009.

In September 2016, Chaska hosted the Ryder Cup at Hazeltine National Golf Course, and in March 2018, the PGA of America, with help from the U.S. Curling team, announced Hazeltine would be the first American venue to host a second Ryder Cup in 2028.

== Geography ==
According to the United States Census Bureau, the city has a total area of 17.77 square miles (46.02 km^{2}), of which 16.97 square miles (43.95 km^{2}) is land and 0.80 square miles (2.07 km^{2}) is water. The downtown portion of Chaska lies on the Minnesota River.

Chaska Boulevard (Old Highway 212), Pioneer Trail, U.S. Highway 212, and Minnesota State Highway 41 are four of the main routes in Chaska.

Climate data for Chaska, Minnesota
Month	Jan	Feb	Mar	Apr	May	Jun	Jul	Aug	Sep	Oct	Nov	Dec	Year
Mean daily maximum °F (°C)	22 (−6)	28 (−2)	40 (4)	57 (14)	69 (21)	78 (26)	81 (27)	78 (26)	71 (22)	58 (14)	41 (5)	26 (−3)	54 (12)
Mean daily minimum °F (°C)	4 (−16)	9 (−13)	21 (−6)	34 (1)	46 (8)	56 (13)	60 (16)	58 (14)	49 (9)	36 (2)	23 (−5)	8 (−13)	34 (1)
Average precipitation inches (mm)	.73 (19)	.66 (17)	1.73 (44)	2.53 (64)	3.69 (94)	4.64 (118)	3.49 (89)	5.05 (128)	3.41 (87)	2.47 (63)	1.64 (42)	.95 (24)	30.99 (789)
Source: The Weather Channel

== Demographics ==
Historical population
Census	Pop.	Note	%±
1880	1,068		—
1890	2,210		106.9%
1900	2,165		−2.0%
1910	2,050		−5.3%
1920	1,966		−4.1%
1930	1,901		−3.3%
1940	1,927		1.4%
1950	2,008		4.2%
1960	2,501		24.6%
1970	4,352		74.0%
1980	8,346		91.8%
1990	11,339		35.9%
2000	17,449		53.9%
2010	23,770		36.2%
2020	27,810		17.0%
2022 (est.)	28,262		1.6%
U.S. Decennial Census; 2020 Census

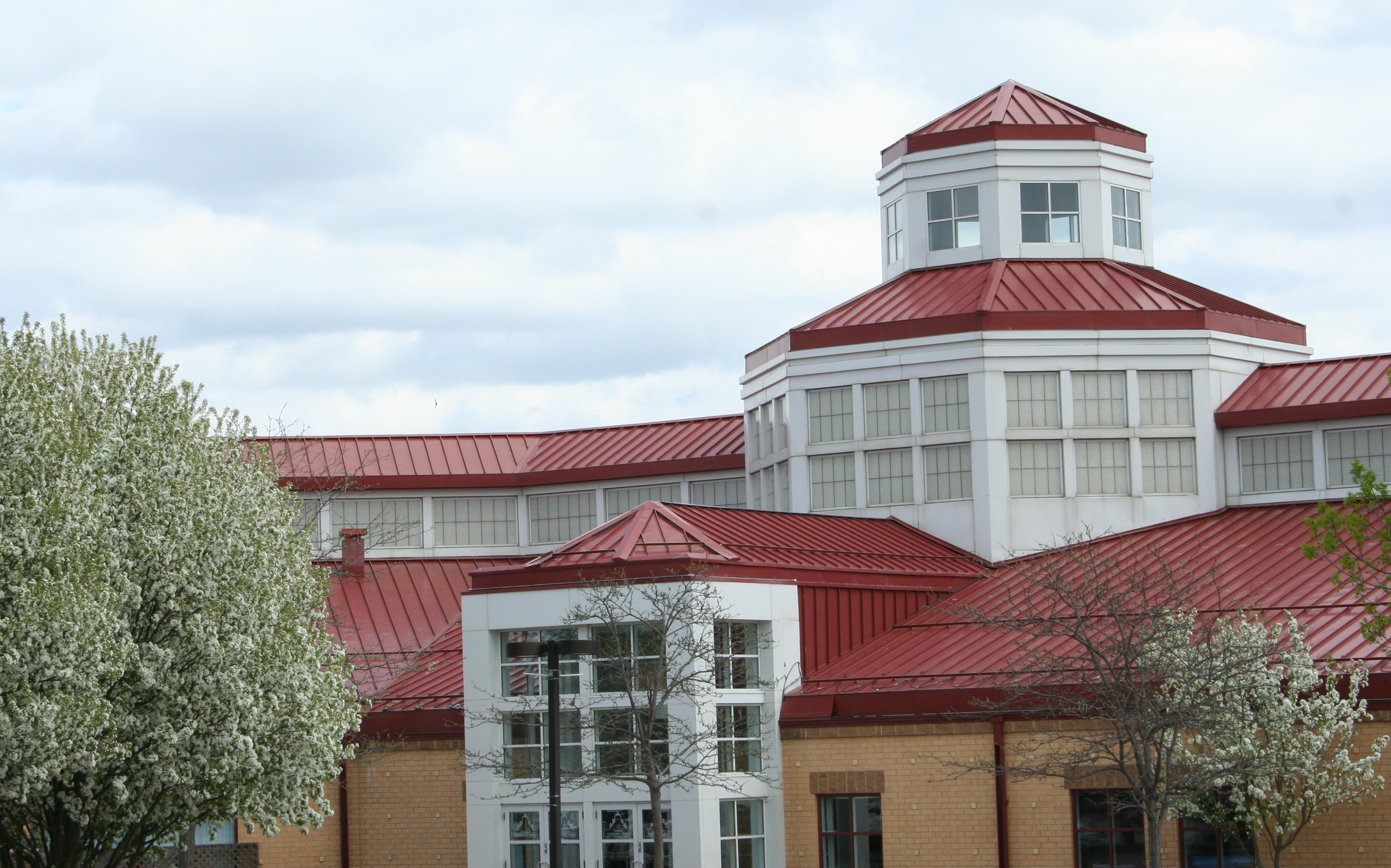
Chaska Community Center

Throughout the first half of the 20th century, Chaska's population averaged about 2,000 and the nature of the city remained unchanged. The city retained its small-town image until the 1950s when the transition to a metropolitan community began. The expansion of the seven-county metropolitan area reached Chaska in the 1960s. With that expansion came the introduction of the Jonathan New Town design concept in 1966. The Jonathan "new town" development within Chaska brought new land, new jobs and new people to the community.

This period of transition and expansion continues today. Dozens of modern industries have located to Chaska and continue to do so; residential construction adds 300 to 400 new homes per year; commercial business continues to expand offering a variety of retail and service opportunities to its residents; redevelopment of commercial areas in the downtown began in the 1980s and still continues. Although the community has seen much growth, development regulations and sound planning have ensured Chaska's small sense of community and the preservation of its rich heritage.

In early 2005, the city of Chaska annexed the remaining portion of Chaska Township. Current plans for the area include a 600-acre (2.4 km^{2}) residential "smart growth"-styled development.

A new spike in the population occurred after the construction of the Highway 212 freeway passing through the heart of Chaska, serving as a fast, direct, link to the heart of the Twin Cities. This freeway includes a bus rapid transit route serving Chaska with fast, efficient mass transit, along with convenient access to the Light Rail system which connects the southwest suburbs to the Twin Cities of Minneapolis and St Paul.

=== 2020 census ===
As of the 2020 census, Chaska had a population of 27,810. The median age was 37.2 years. 26.9% of residents were under the age of 18 and 11.7% of residents were 65 years of age or older. For every 100 females there were 95.3 males, and for every 100 females age 18 and over there were 92.7 males age 18 and over.

98.4% of residents lived in urban areas, while 1.6% lived in rural areas.

There were 10,438 households in Chaska, of which 36.6% had children under the age of 18 living in them. Of all households, 54.6% were married-couple households, 14.7% were households with a male householder and no spouse or partner present, and 24.6% were households with a female householder and no spouse or partner present. About 24.9% of all households were made up of individuals and 9.9% had someone living alone who was 65 years of age or older.

There were 10,788 housing units, of which 3.2% were vacant. The homeowner vacancy rate was 1.3% and the rental vacancy rate was 4.0%.

Racial composition as of the 2020 census
Race	Number	Percent
White	21,934	78.9%
Black or African American	1,270	4.6%
American Indian and Alaska Native	144	0.5%
Asian	1,102	4.0%
Native Hawaiian and Other Pacific Islander	8	0.0%
Some other race	1,508	5.4%
Two or more races	1,844	6.6%
Hispanic or Latino (of any race)	2,707	9.7%

=== 2010 census ===
As of the census of 2010, there were 23,770 people, 8,816 households, and 6,188 families residing in the city. The population density was 1,400.7 inhabitants per square mile (540.8/km^{2}). There were 9,290 housing units at an average density of 547.4 per square mile (211.4/km^{2}). The racial makeup of the city was 88.1% White, 2.5% African American, 0.4% Native American, 3.7% Asian, 3.4% from other races, and 2.0% from two or more races. Hispanic or Latino of any race were 8.5% of the population.

There were 8,816 households, of which 41.9% had children under the age of 18 living with them, 54.6% were married couples living together, 11.1% had a female householder with no husband present, 4.5% had a male householder with no wife present, and 29.8% were non-families. 23.9% of all households were made up of individuals, and 6% had someone living alone who was 65 years of age or older. The average household size was 2.68 and the average family size was 3.22.

The median age in the city was 33.8 years. 30% of residents were under the age of 18; 6.9% were between the ages of 18 and 24; 30.8% were from 25 to 44; 25.7% were from 45 to 64; and 6.6% were 65 years of age or older. The gender makeup of the city was 49.8% male and 50.2% female.

=== 2000 census ===
As of 2000, the median income for a household in the city was $60,325, and the median income for a family was $69,612. Males had a median income of $45,401 versus $32,312 for females. The per capita income for the city was $25,368. About 3.4% of families and 4.7% of the population were below the poverty line, including 5.9% of those under age 18 and 6.4% of those age 65 or over.

== Economy ==
Starting in 2004, the city government offered low-cost, high-speed wireless internet service for residents, businesses, and government entities throughout the community through a service called Chaska.net, but the program was canceled, after more than 10 years, in 2015 due to a decreasing customer base and large costs to upgrade equipment. Chaska is the home of numerous industrial and manufacturing concerns. Among them are TPI Specialties, Update Ltd, Wigen Water Technologies, Beckman Coulter and Hartman Homes.

Over the years, Chaska has also been the birthplace of several well known products and companies, including Softsoap, NordicTrack, the Gedney Foods Company, and Heartland America. One such company, My Pillow, has received significant media coverage for multiple lawsuits as well as controversial issues focusing on its founder, Mike Lindell.

Opening in December 2015, the Chaska Curling Center has exceeded expectations as becoming a landmark in the city. The Center has helped with not only expanding Chaska community engagement and positively impacting downtown businesses, but also bringing the city national and international recognition as well as tourism. In 2016, to commemorate the start of the international Ryder Cup tournament, hosted in Chaska, the Norwegian and American Olympic teams squared off for an International Bonspiel, again bringing international eyes to the community. In 2018, the Chaska Curling Center was named a USA Curling National Training Center for the United States Curling Association, which means the Curling Center is able to host national events with USA Curling, and the USA Curling High Performance Program and Development Program can use the Chaska Curling Center for practices, camps, and events.

=== Top employers ===
According to the City's 2020 Comprehensive Annual Financial Report, the largest employers in the city are:

#	Employer	# of Employees
1	ISD #112/Eastern Carver County	1,346
2	Entegris Inc	925
3	Beckman-Coulter, Inc	850
4	TEL-FSI, Inc	850
5	Carver County	700
6	The Bernard Group	646
7	Lake Region Manufacturing Co., Inc	600
8	Old National Bank	560
9	City of Chaska	535
10	Apex International, MFG	400

== Government ==
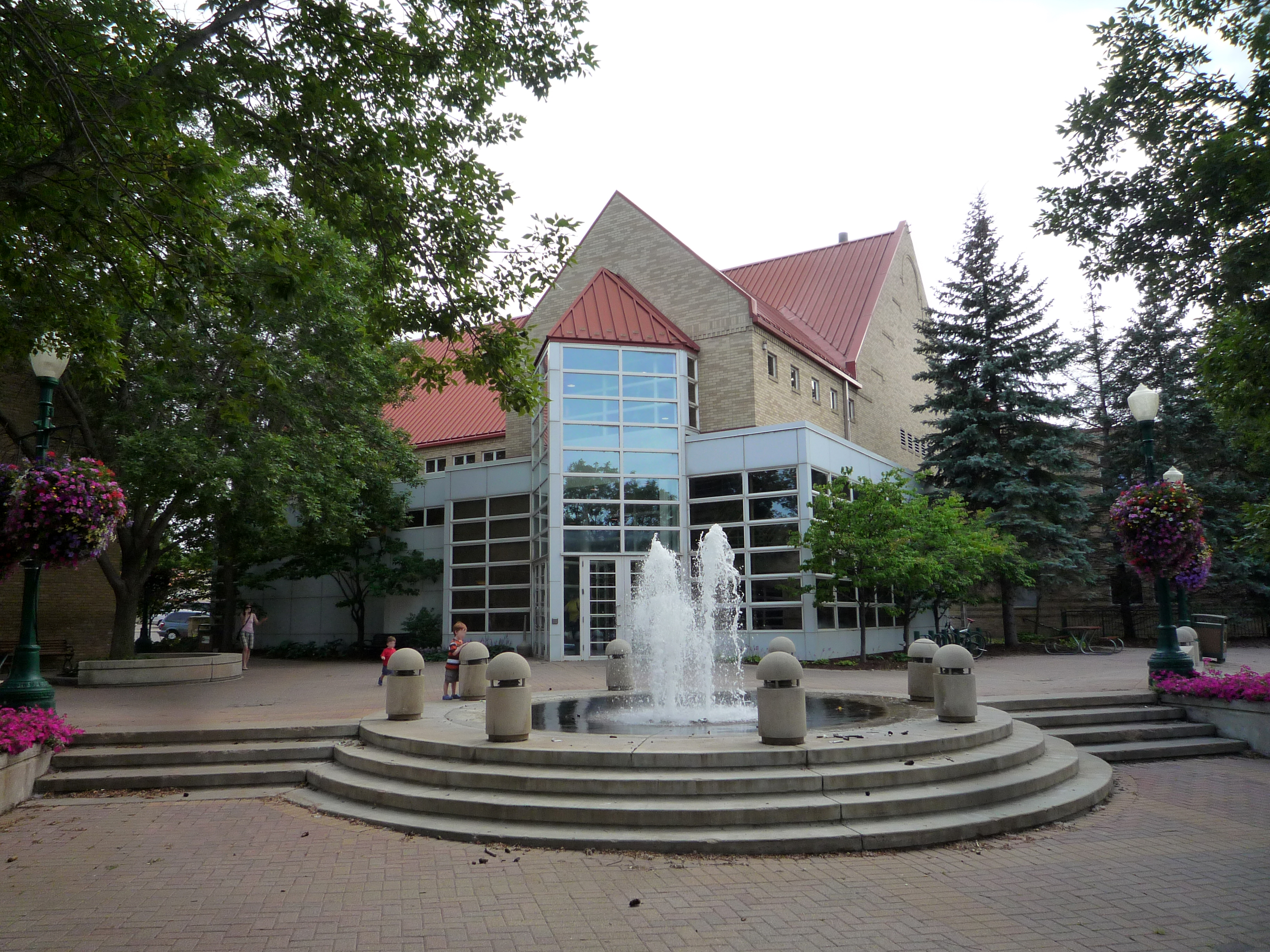
Chaska City Hall on City Hall Plaza

The City of Chaska uses the council–manager form of municipal government. The council consists of four council members, each representing the residents of a ward that contains approximately 25% of the population of the community, and a mayor who is elected at large. Each council member serves a four-year term, while the mayor is elected for a two-year term. The city council formulates city policy and the city administrator and staff are responsible for city administration. In 2019, the mayor was Mark Windschitl, and the council members were: Jon Grau (Ward I), Taylor Hubbard (Ward II), McKayla Hatfield (Ward III), and Mike Huang (Ward IV).

Chaska is located in Minnesota's 6th congressional district, represented by Tom Emmer, a Republican.

For representation in the Minnesota Legislature, Chaska is part of Minnesota Senate district 48 and divided into two districts, 48A and 48B, for the Minnesota House. As of June 2025 the senator is Julie Coleman (Republican) and the two representatives are Jim Nash (Republican) for district 48A and Lucy Rehm (DFL) for 48B.

== Politics ==
Chaska city vote by party in presidential elections
Year	Democratic	Republican	Third Parties
2020	53.19% 8,476	44.27% 7,054	2.54% 404
2016	43.53% 5,827	46.14% 6,176	10.32% 1,382
2012	44.96% 5,727	52.80% 6,726	2.25% 286
2008	46.96% 5,598	51.35% 6,122	1.69% 202
2004	41.10% 4,416	57.82% 6,212	1.08% 116
2000	40.45% 3,121	53.29% 4,111	6.26% 483

In the 2016 United States presidential election in Minnesota, Donald Trump won the city by three points. In the 2020 United States presidential election in Minnesota, turnout increased from 2016 and Democrat Joe Biden won the city by nine points.

== Education ==
Chaska is located in the Eastern Carver County Schools district (Independent School District 112). Elementary schools located in Chaska include Clover Ridge Elementary, Jonathan Elementary, and La Academia Spanish Immersion. The District 112 middle schools, all of which are in Chaska, are Chaska Middle School East, Chaska Middle School West, and Pioneer Ridge Middle School. Chaska High School and Chanhassen High School are the district's two high schools.

Southwest Christian High School, which is a private high school, is also in Chaska. Several private grade schools are also in town, including St. John's Lutheran Church and School, and Guardian Angels Catholic School.

== Popular culture ==
In the 1996 film Fargo, written by Minnesota's own Joel and Ethan Coen, Chaska was represented by two of the supporting characters, real-life Tony Denman (who played Scotty Lundegaard), a Chanhassen native, attended Chaska High School, and a young prostitute (played by Larissa Kokernot) who claimed not only to have serviced Carl Showalter (played by Steve Buscemi), but also to be from Chaska, Minnesota.

Chaska was also featured in the film Drop Dead Gorgeous. The scene in the furniture store takes place at the old Schniedermen's Furniture store in downtown Chaska. The building has since become a fitness center and was razed in 2018 to make way for a small strip mall.

Hank Snow refers to Chaska in his popular song "I've Been Everywhere" as a place he has visited.

Cheryl Strayed briefly lived in Chaska during her early life, and mentions so in her popular book Wild: From Lost to Found on the Pacific Crest Trail.

Chaska is also home of the "World's Largest" 3D printed "Mustache" found at 516 N Pine St. in downtown Chaska. The mustache is nearly 12 feet wide and took over 300 hours to print. Previously a bright red, the mustache was painted purple as the first contribution to the “painting the county purple” public art project honoring Prince.

== Notable people ==
- Phillip Bartlett, actor, voice of Mewtwo in the first Pokémon movie
- Andy Bisek, American Greco-Roman wrestler, two-time World bronze medalist and 2016 Olympian
- Greg Boe, Representative, District 47-B, Minnesota House of Representatives
- Tony Denman, actor
- Ryan Dungey, Professional motocross rider for team Red Bull/KTM
- Brad Hand, MLB pitcher for the Philadelphia Phillies
- Kris Humphries, former NBA player
- Jeff Isaacson, a two-time Gold medal American Olympic curler
- Charles H. Klein, Minnesota state legislator and businessman
- Josh Liljenquist, social media personality
- Mike Lindell, founder of My Pillow
- Howard G. Ottinger, businessman, farmer, and Minnesota state legislator
- Gordon Paschka, former NFL player
- Erik Paulsen, United States Congressman, MN 3rd Congressional District
- Mike Reilly, defenseman for the New York Islanders
- Howie Schultz, MLB first baseman for the Brooklyn Dodgers
- Dave Snuggerud, former NHL player and 1988 Olympian
- Edward Van Sloan, actor/artist
- Jimmy Snuggerud, NHL right winger for the St. Louis Blues

== See also ==
- Chaska Town Course
- Walnut Street Historic District
- Hazeltine National Golf Club
- Jonathan, Minnesota
- FSI International, now TEL FSI and Dark Waters (2019 film)
