= Softsoap =

Trade name of Colgate-Palmolive's liquid hand soap & body wash

- Product type: Soap
- Current owner: Colgate-Palmolive
- Country: United States
- Introduced: 1980; 46 years ago
- Website: www.softsoap.com

A 1980 Softsoap commercial

Softsoap (marketed as Softsoap Brand) is the trade name of Colgate-Palmolive's liquid hand soap and body wash. The company is noted for its soap dispensers' former aquarium theme, where the dispenser would be styled to make it look like an aquarium with tropical fish printed inside the plastic.

William Sheppard of New York was granted patent number 49,561 for his "Improved Liquid Soap" on August 22, 1865, for his discovery that a small amount of conventional soap could be mixed with large amounts of spirits of ammonia (or hartshorn, as it was known at the time) to create a soap with a consistency similar to that of molasses. His invention became common in public areas but was not generally available for use in homes.

In 1980, entrepreneur Robert R. Taylor began selling pump soap under "Softsoap" through his company, The Minnetonka Corporation, located in Chaska, Minnesota. To give the product exclusivity in the marketplace, he purchased 100 million hand-pumped plastic bottles – a year's production capacity from the only two domestic manufacturers – so no one else could release a similar product during that time. Within six months, he had sold $25 million worth of Softsoap. He sold the brand to Colgate-Palmolive in 1987.

== See also ==
- Soft soap (disambiguation)
