= Chaska Township, Carver County, Minnesota =

Former township in Minnesota, United States

Chaska Township
- Township
- Location within the state of Minnesota
- Coordinates: 44°47′39″N 93°37′37″W
- Country: United States
- State: Minnesota
- County: Carver

Area
  - Total: 2.9 sq mi (7.4 km^{2})
  - Land: 2.9 sq mi (7.4 km^{2})
  - Water: 0 sq mi (0.0 km^{2})
- Elevation: 942 ft (287 m)

Population (2000)
  - Total: 154
  - Density: 54/sq mi (20.8/km^{2})
- Time zone: UTC-6 (Central (CST))
  - Summer (DST): UTC-5 (CDT)
- ZIP code: 55318
- Area code: 952
- FIPS code: 27-10990
- GNIS feature ID: 0663785

Chaska Township was a township in Carver County, Minnesota, United States. The population was 154 at the 2000 census.

== Geography ==
According to the United States Census Bureau, the township had a total area of 2.9 square miles (7.5 km^{2}). 2.9 square miles (7.5 km^{2}) of it was land and 0.35% was water.

== Demographics ==
Historical population
Census	Pop.	Note	%±
1860	552		—
1870	847		53.4%
1880	187		−77.9%
1890	366		95.7%
1900	169		−53.8%
1910	166		−1.8%
1920	173		4.2%
1930	178		2.9%
1940	165		−7.3%
1950	185		12.1%
1960	233		25.9%
1970	119		−48.9%
1980	205		72.3%
1990	174		−15.1%
2000	154		−11.5%
U.S. Decennial Census

As of the census of 2000, there were 154 people, 65 households, and 46 families residing in the township. The population density was 53.8 inhabitants per square mile (20.8/km^{2}). There were 66 housing units at an average density of 23.1/sq mi (8.9/km^{2}). The racial makeup of the township was 100.00% White. 72.4% were of German, 7.9% Irish and 7.9% Norwegian ancestry according to Census 2000.

There were 65 households, out of which 30.8% had children under the age of 18 living with them, 60.0% were married couples living together, 7.7% had a female householder with no husband present, and 29.2% were non-families. 29.2% of all households were made up of individuals, and 12.3% had someone living alone who was 65 years of age or older. The average household size was 2.37 and the average family size was 2.91.

In the township the population was spread out, with 23.4% under the age of 18, 6.5% from 18 to 24, 31.8% from 25 to 44, 22.7% from 45 to 64, and 15.6% who were 65 years of age or older. The median age was 40 years. For every 100 females, there were 87.8 males. For every 100 females age 18 and over, there were 90.3 males.

The median income for a household in the township was $54,375, and the median income for a family was $61,250. Males had a median income of $36,875 versus $31,250 for females. The per capita income for the township was $23,548. None of the families and 2.0% of the population were living below the poverty line, including no under eighteens and 9.1% of those over 64.

== Annexation by Chaska ==
As a result of continuing growth in the Minneapolis-St. Paul area, Chaska Township was annexed by the city of Chaska. The township dissolved on February 11, 2005. Current plans call for 600 acres (2.4 km^{2}) of the former township, about half of the annexed land, to be developed in a project called "Heights of Chaska". The planned development includes housing, two neighborhood retail centers, community parks and an elementary school. The plan is in line with Metropolitan Council desires for "smart growth".
