= Gedney Foods Company =

American food processing company

- Formerly: M.A. Gedney Company
- Type: Private
- Industry: Food processing
- Founded: 1880 - Chaska, Minnesota
- Founder: Matthias Anderson Gedney
- Headquarters: Burnsville, Minnesota, United States
- Products: pickled cucumbers, relish, fruit preserves, and other pickled products
- Website: www.gedneyfoods.com

The Gedney Foods Company, previously known as the M.A. Gedney Company, is an American food processing company located in Burnsville, Minnesota. The company's most notable product is pickled cucumbers which are branded as "The Minnesota Pickle".

== History ==
The Gedney Foods Company was founded in 1880 by Matthias Anderson Gedney (1822–1905), originally from Paterson, New Jersey. Gedney was a veteran of the United States Navy and eyewitness to the Somers Affair. Gedney later worked for the Northwestern Pickle Works, a pickle manufacturer out of Evanston, Illinois. Gedney also worked for the S.M. Dingee and Company out of Chicago which also produced pickles.

Gedney eventually moved to Minneapolis in 1879, in hopes of creating his own pickle company. Gedney is noted as being one of the first individuals to introduce domestic mass production of cucumbers to the state of Minnesota. Gedney's first factory was officially opened in 1881, and was located on Lowry Avenue and Pacific Avenue in northern Minneapolis. The company was formerly incorporated on April 23, 1888. By 1893, the company had factories in Minnesota, Nebraska, and Wisconsin. Following the death of Matthias Gedney in 1905, the company continued to be ran by Gedney's son, Isadore Vallier Gedney, and his descendants. According the Kathryn Hujda of the Minnesota Historical Society, Gedney's market share in 1950 was 80%, however by 1986, other pickle companies such as Vlasic Pickles decreased Gedney's market share to 45%.

The company currently produces pickles, relish, and jam preserves, as well as all pickle related products for Del Monte Corporation and the Target Corporation. Gedney acquired the Cains Pickle brand in 2000, the Caine brand was later purchased by TreeHouse Foods in 2013. The Gedney pickle plant along Stoughton Avenue on the border of Chanhassen and Chaska was officially shut down in 2019.

== Slogan and jingle ==
Gedney is known regionally as "The Minnesota Pickle", the slogan was first introduced by the company on October 17, 1988, for branding purposes. A corresponding jingle was also created by Sandy Buckholtz called the "Minnesota Pickle Polka", which was advertised on local radio stations in order to encourage brand loyalty to local consumers. Since 1988 the slogan has been used on all Gedney products.
