= Howard G. Ottinger =

American farmer, businessman, and politician

Howard G. Ottinger (August 27, 1888 – May 10, 1964) was an American farmer, businessman, and politician.

Ottinger was born in Laketown Township, Carver County, Minnesota. He graduated from Chaska High School in Chaska, Minnesota, in 1907. Ottinger lived in Chaska, Minnesota with his wife and family and was a farmer. He was also involved with the Chaska Cooperative Creamery and served as the secretary. Ottinger served on the Chaska school board and in the Minnesota House of Representatives from 1939 to 1960.
