= Oettinger =

Oettinger may refer to:

- Anthony Oettinger (1929–2022), a computer scientist
- Günther Oettinger (born 1953), a German and EU politician
- Jake Oettinger (born 1998), American ice hockey goalie
- Konrad Öttinger, Reformation-era German Protestant theologian
- Oettinger Brewery, a brewery group based in Oettingen
- a resident of Oettingen in Bayern

== See also ==
- Oetinger, a surname
- Oettinger's law, a sound law in Hittite
