= Clearly Canadian =

Brand of bottled water

- Type: Sparkling water
- Manufacturer: Clearly Food & Beverage Company Ltd.
- Origin: Canada
- Introduced: December 1987
- Colour: Clear
- Flavor: Sparkling Flavoured & Non-Flavoured Spring Water
- Website: www.clearlycanadian.com

Clearly Canadian (French: Clairement Canadien) is a brand of premium sparkling waters produced by The Clearly Food & Beverage Company Ltd. based in British Columbia, Canada. The brand was founded in 1987.

== History ==
Clearly Canadian was founded in 1987 by Gordon Sim, Doug Mason and others in British Columbia. The drink began shipping in January 1988. The drink was distinguished from other soda lines due to using sugar instead of high fructose corn syrup, natural flavors, and no food colourings. It is often considered as one of the first premium "new age beverage" products, helping to pave way for the multibillion-dollar market in this category. The company changed its name to Clearly Canadian Beverage Company in 1990. The brand has produced its products every year since 1987, except for a brief hiatus in 2010 and 2011.

Clearly Canadian experienced rapid market-dominating growth throughout the 1990s alongside Snapple and Red Bull, but fell into broad corporate mismanagement beginning in 2000 and up to 2012, when it was acquired by serial entrepreneur, Robert R. Khan, under his 4NCapital Partners investment firm. Large-scale commercial production resumed shortly thereafter in Canada and was precipitated by an online crowd-sourcing campaign that pre-sold in excess of 40,000 cases.

=== Timeline ===
- 1987: Clearly Canadian, a sweetened, naturally flavoured sparkling water, is introduced.
- 1993: Annual sales hit $155 million.
- 1993: Royalty agreement with Camfrey Resources is terminated for $22.9 million.
- 1994: Clearly Tea and Clearly Two beverages are test-marketed.
- 1996: Hostile acquisition pursuit of Sun-Rype Products Ltd. initiated.
- 1996: Orbitz, with free-floating gel spheres, is introduced.
- 1997: Cascade Clear Water Co. is acquired.
- 1998: Clearly Canadian O+2, Battery, and Refresher drinks are introduced.
- 2000: Packaging of flagship line is redesigned and diet flavours are added.
- 2001: Founding management exits.
- 2005: Recapitalization brings about new ownership and management.
- 2006: Company founder resigns as chairman.
- 2007: DMR Food Corporation is acquired.
- 2007: My Organic Baby is acquired.
- 2010: Successful creditor reorganization.
- 2012: 4NCapital Partners, led by Robert Khan, acquires company.
- 2013: Fan-sourced (crowd-sourcing) direct-to-consumer pre-sales campaign.
- 2015: Pre-sale campaign reached its goal of 25,000 cases pre-sold, pushing the product back into production.
- 2017: Clearly Canadian producing at national levels in both Vancouver and Montreal.
- 2021: Clearly Canadian is sold in a non-disclosed sale to private investors.
- 2023: Clearly Canadian launches Zero Sugar (stevia sweetened) & Essence Unsweetened portfolios.
- 2024: Clearly Canadian launches its "Originals" in 6-pack SleekCans.

== See also ==
- Orbitz (drink)
