= Walmarting =

Neologism referring to the Walmart company

Walmarting or Walmartization is a neologism referring to U.S. discount department store Walmart with three meanings. The first use is similar to the concept of globalization and is used pejoratively by critics and neutrally by businesses seeking to emulate Walmart's success. The second use is pejorative, and refers to the homogenization of the retail sector because of those practices. The third use is neutral, and refers to the act of actually shopping at Walmart.

== Background ==
The term "Walmarting" derives from debate over Walmart's business practices, which apply optimization concepts from logistics, purchasing and finance to achieve and maintain low prices. More generally, "Walmarting" refers to the spread of Walmart's business model to other big-box retailers throughout the American economy, and the national or global implications of that proliferation.

The Walmart business model includes: marketing to a broad "family" demographic that includes rural as well as urban, ethnic minorities as well as mainstream, people without a higher-level education, lower- or working-class consumers, as well as the middle-class; one-stop shopping based on a large selection of goods and services; the use of intense price-competition and high-technology inventory management to stimulate and satisfy end-user demand; economies of scale based on big-box delivery of consumables; supply-chain management that requires producers to reduce their costs significantly to find an outlet for their goods; employment of store workers for low wages, few benefits, and little job security to reduce overhead.

Critics have claimed that the domestic impact of Walmarting is to force local businesses into bankruptcy because they are unable to compete with Walmart's "low, low prices", and to reduce the standard of living for local workers who lose their jobs, then must accept work at Walmart levels of compensation. Similarly, some critics argue that the international impact of Walmarting is to force American suppliers to rely on low-wage foreign producers for goods, leading in turn to an unfavorable national balance of trade and contributing to the growth of the American temporary and low-wage employment sector.

Walmarting differs both from "Disneyfication" and "McDonaldization", though there is a resemblance. "Disneyfication" and "McDonaldization" emphasize the "fun" of theme park attractions and fast food dining, while Walmarting markets itself mainly upon shopping for savings. "Disneyfied" businesses embellish a particular theme as imagined history, while "McDonaldized" businesses rationalize a specific good or service. By contrast, "Walmarting" plays upon a single aspect of shopping – getting a bargain – and applies it across the board to a broad range of goods and services available in its "super-stores".

The "Walmarting" concept has been applied in various industries. The external links below cite examples of its usage for the first two definitions.

== India ==
India has experienced a similar phenomenon of Walmartization to the United States, with significant negative ramifications for its economy.

== See also ==
- Big box store
- Category killer
- Cocacolonization
- Criticism of Walmart
- Wake Up Wal-Mart
- Whirl-Mart
