= Criticism of Walmart =

Criticism against large retailer based in the United States

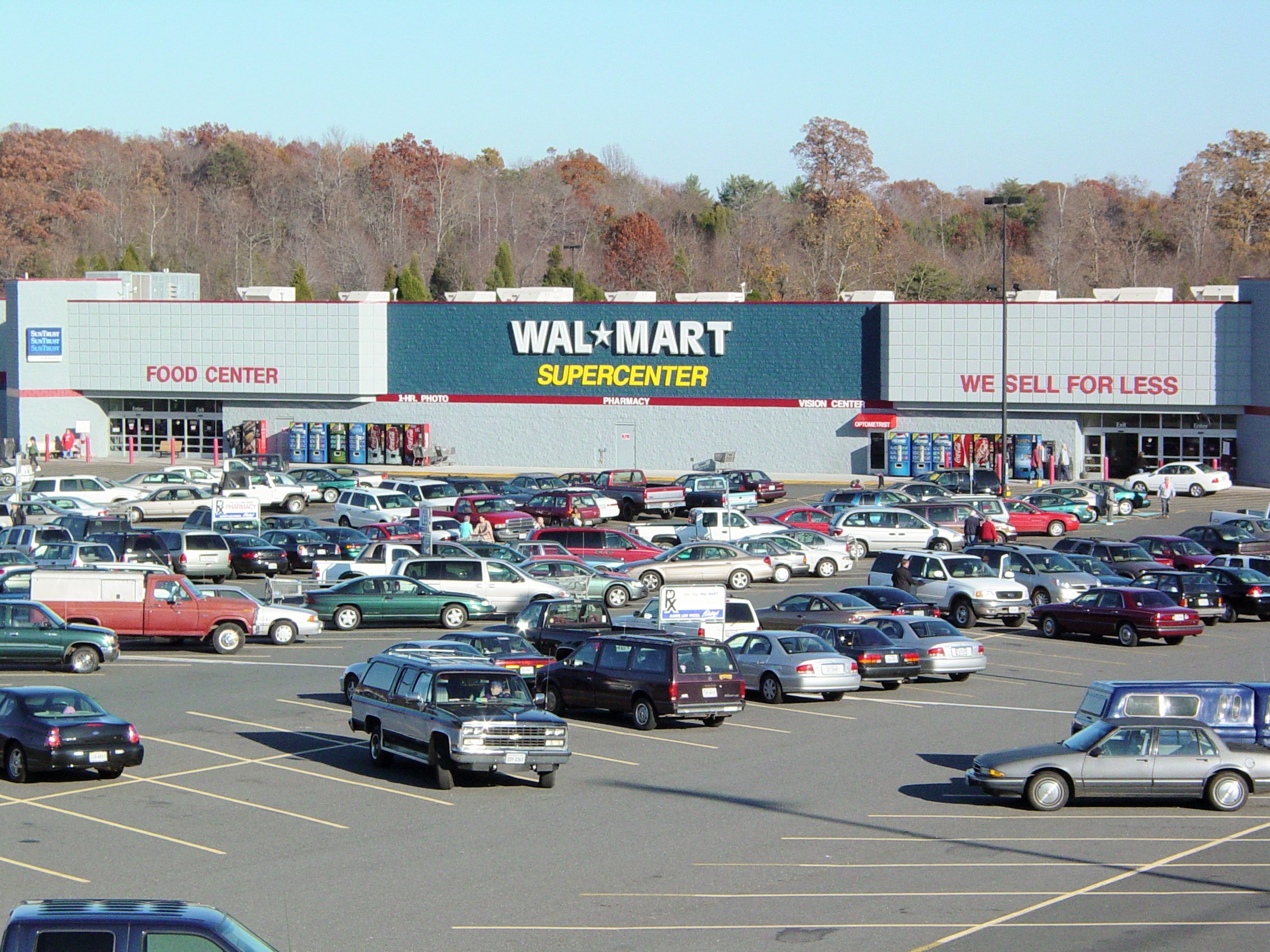
A Walmart Supercenter in Madison Heights, Virginia (2005)

The American multinational retail chain Walmart has received criticism from parties such as labor unions and small town advocates for its policies and business practices.

Criticisms include charges of racial and gender discrimination, foreign product sourcing, anticompetitive practices, treatment of product suppliers, environmental practices, the use of public subsidies, and its surveillance of its employees. The company has denied any wrongdoing and said that low prices are the result of efficiency.

In 2005, labor unions created new organizations and websites to criticize the company, including Wake Up Walmart (United Food and Commercial Workers) and Walmart Watch (Service Employees International Union). By the end of 2005, Walmart had launched Working Families for Walmart to counter those groups. Efforts to counter criticism include a public relations campaign in this same year, which included several television commercials. The company retained the public relations firm Edelman to interact with the press and respond to negative media reports, and has started working with bloggers by sending them news, suggesting topics for postings, and inviting them to visit Walmart's corporate headquarters. In November 2005, a documentary film critical of Walmart (Walmart: The High Cost of Low Price) was released on DVD.

Critics say that Walmart's lower prices draw customers away from smaller Main Street businesses, hurting local small town communities, and that the company hurts the United States economy by relying excessively on Chinese-produced products – Walmart is the largest importer in the United States in many categories, such as electronics and fast-moving consumer goods. The 2006 book The Walmart Effect by business journalist Charles Fishman contains much of the criticism, though it also enumerates Walmart's positive impacts within society.

== Local communities ==
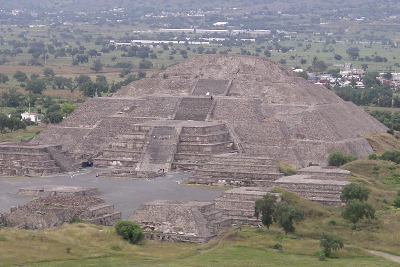
Walmart opened its Teotihuacan Superstore near the Pyramid of the Moon amid community protests.

When Walmart plans a new store location, as often as not the company has to fight its way into town in the municipal equivalent of civil war between pro- and anti-Walmart factions. Opponents cite concerns such as traffic congestion, environmental problems, public safety, absentee landlordism, bad public relations, low wages and benefits, and predatory pricing. Opposition by activists, competitors, local citizens, labor unions, and religious groups may include protest marches, property damage to store buildings, or by creating bomb scares. Some city councils have denied permits to developers planning to include a Walmart in their project. Those who defend Walmart cite consumer choice and overall benefits to the economy, and object to bringing the issue into the political arena.

In 1998, Walmart proposed construction of a store west of the intersection of Charlotte Pike (U.S. Route 70) and Interstate 40 outside Nashville, Tennessee. The building site was home to both Native American burial grounds and a Civil War battlefield. Protests were mounted by Native Americans and Civil War interest groups, but the Walmart store was eventually constructed after moving graves and some modifications of the site so as not to interfere with the battlefield. Civil War relics were discovered at the site. The project developers donated land to permit access to the Civil War historic site. The Native sites were removed and re-buried elsewhere.

A Walmart superstore opened in 2004 in Mexico, 1.9 miles (3.1 kilometres) from the historic Teotihuacan archaeological site and Pyramid of the Moon. Although the location was supported by Mexico's National Anthropology Institute, the United Nations, and the Paris-based International Council on Monuments and Sites, there had been protests organized by local merchants, as well as environmental groups and anti-globalization groups who opposed the construction. Poet Homero Aridjis called the opening as "supremely symbolic" and "like planting the staff of globalization in the heart of ancient Mexico". Archaeologists oversaw construction and discovered a small clay and stone altar along with some other artifacts where the store's parking lot is now located.

In 2005, developers demolished the long-closed Dixmont State Hospital in Kilbuck Township, Pennsylvania, near Pittsburgh, with plans to build a shopping complex anchored by a Walmart. While there were initially no general objections to the Walmart store itself, many residents did not want to see Dixmont demolished, despite the fact that the Dixmont complex, having been abandoned in 1984, was beyond maintainable condition and teenagers were dangerously trespassing onto the property on a regular basis. However, while the land was being excavated (after the hospital complex was torn down) in order to create a plateau for the store to be built upon, a landslide occurred covering Pennsylvania Route 65 and the Fort Wayne Line railroad tracks between PA 65 and the Ohio River. Both routes were shut down for weeks. While Walmart did "stabilize" the landslide, many residents said that Walmart merely stabilized the hillside so that it could continue with work to build the store. Ultimately, in 2007 Walmart decided against developing the site, allowing the land to return to nature, with a Walmart location to be constructed in nearby Economy, Pennsylvania, instead behind the Northern Lights Shopping Center. After some opposition from the local Giant Eagle location at the plaza, the Walmart location opened in 2014.

In the 2010s, a proposal to build the Midtown Walmart supercenter in Midtown Miami was met with litigation and opposition from local businesses, delaying construction of the project. A Florida Third District Court of Appeal panel of judges denied the opposition's challenge of the city's approvals and Walmart broke ground on the development in January 2016.

In 2014, researchers at the University of South Carolina and Sam Houston State University published a study on whether Walmart affected local crime rates. In the 1990s, crime rates were in fact decreasing throughout most of the United States. The study found that this decrease was "nowhere near" as impressive in most communities that had a Walmart store, as if the presence of the large retailer was somehow stunting the decrease. The authors acknowledged the cause-and-effect arrow may go in the opposite direction. For example, one co-author stated, "Counties with more social capital – citizens able and willing to speak up about the best interests of the community – tend to have lower crime rates. Counties with more crime may have less social capital and, therefore, less ability to prevent Wal-Mart from building."

== Allegations of predatory pricing and supplier issues ==
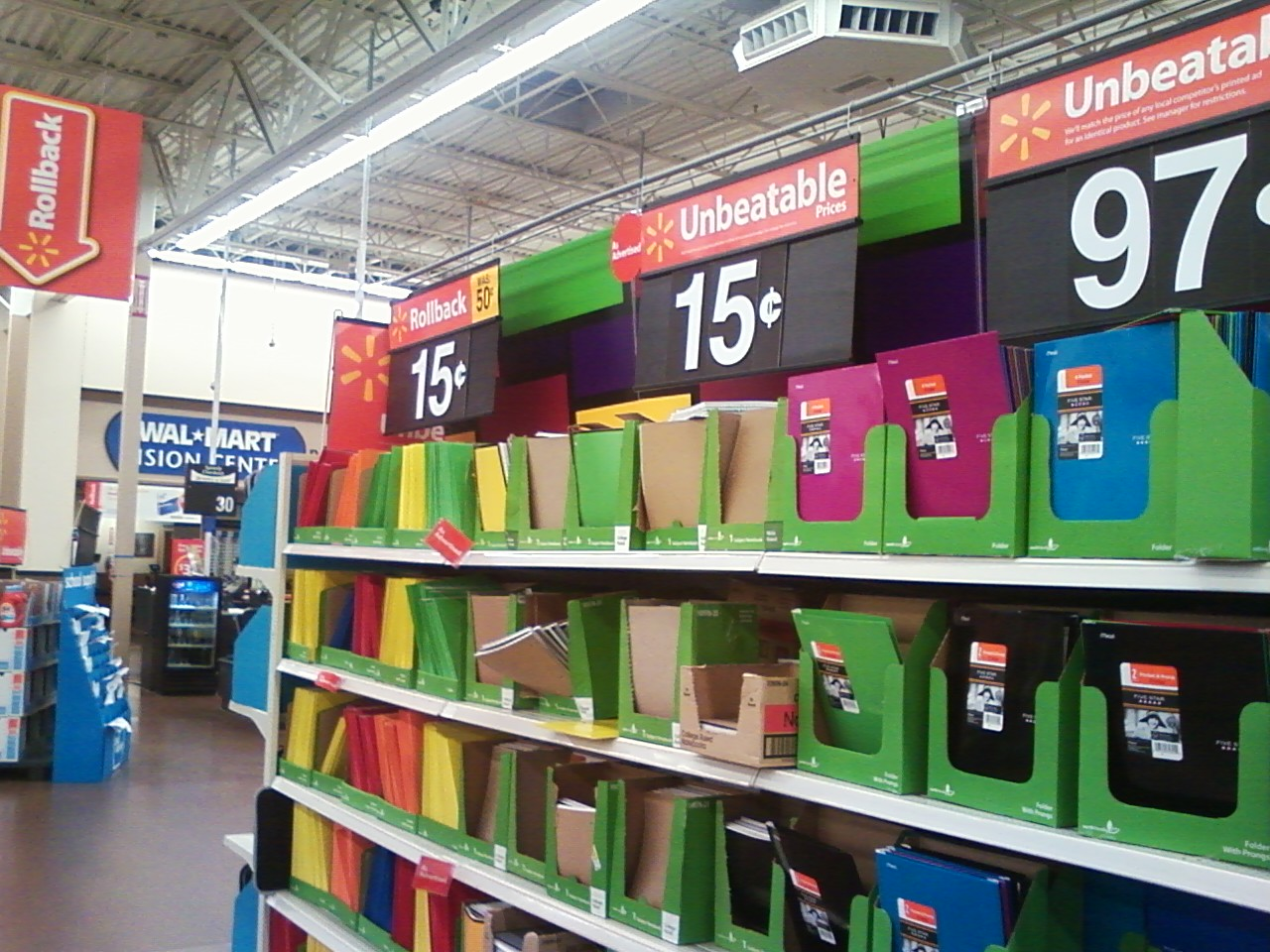
Heavily discounted products

Walmart has been accused of selling merchandise at such low costs that competitors have tried to sue for predatory pricing (intentionally selling a product at low cost in order to drive competitors out of the market). In 1995, in the case of Walmart Stores, Inc. v. American Drugs, Inc., pharmacy retailer American Drugs accused Walmart of selling items at too low a cost for the purpose of injuring competitors and destroying competition. The Supreme Court of Arkansas ruled in favor of Walmart saying that its pricing, including the use of loss leaders, was not predatory pricing. In 2000, the Wisconsin Department of Agriculture, Trade, and Consumer Protection accused Walmart of selling butter, milk, laundry detergent, and other staple goods at low cost, with the intention of forcing competitors out of business and gaining a monopoly in local markets. The case was settled out of court. Crest Foods filed a similar lawsuit in Oklahoma, accusing Walmart of predatory pricing on several of its products, in an effort to drive Crest Foods's own company-owned store in Edmond, Oklahoma, out of business.

In 2003, Mexico's antitrust agency, the Federal Competition Commission, investigated Walmart for "monopolistic practices" prompted by charges that the retailer pressured suppliers to sell goods below cost or at prices significantly less than those available to other stores. Mexican authorities found no wrongdoing on the part of Walmart. However, in 2003, Germany's High Court ruled that Walmart's low cost pricing strategy "undermined competition" and ordered Walmart and two other supermarkets to raise their prices. Walmart won appeal of the ruling, then the German Supreme Court overturned the appeal. Walmart has since sold its stores in Germany.

Walmart has been accused of using monopoly power to force its suppliers into self-defeating practices. In 2006, Barry C. Lynn, a senior fellow at the New America Foundation (a think tank), said that Walmart's constant demand for lower prices caused Kraft Foods to "shut down thirty-nine plants, to let go [of] 13,500 workers, and to eliminate a quarter of its products." Kraft was unable to compete with other suppliers and said the cost of production had gone up due to higher energy and raw material costs. Lynn said that in a free market, Kraft could have passed those costs on to its distributors and ultimately consumers. As another example in 2006, most Walmart store pharmacies filled many generic prescriptions for $4 for a month's supply. However, in California and ten other states, complaints from other pharmacies resulted in Walmart being required to charge at least $9 for a month's supply of certain drugs.

In May 2010, Walmart's United States stores pulled the Chinese-made Miley Cyrus line of necklaces and bracelets after an Associated Press release that the jewelry contained harmful amounts of the toxic metal cadmium. Cadmium in jewelry is not known to be dangerous if the items are simply worn, but concerns come when a child bites or sucks on the jewelry, as children are apt to do. Walmart said that while the jewelry is not intended for children, "it is possible that a few younger consumers may seek it out in stores. We are removing all of the jewelry from sale while we investigate its compliance with our children's jewelry standard", Walmart said.

== Labor relations ==
Workers speak during Occupy Wall Street.

With over 2.2 million employees worldwide, Walmart has faced a torrent of lawsuits and issues with regards to its workforce. These issues involve low wages, poor working conditions, inadequate health care, as well as issues involving the company's strong anti-union policies. In November 2013, the National Labor Relations Board (NLRB) announced that it had found that in 13 U.S. states Walmart had pressured employees not to engage in strikes on Black Friday, and had illegally disciplined workers who had engaged in strikes. Critics point to Walmart's high turnover rate as evidence of an unhappy workforce, although other factors may be involved. Approximately 70 percent of its employees leave within the first year. Despite this turnover rate, the company is still able to affect unemployment rates. This was found in a study by Oklahoma State University which states, "Walmart is found to have substantially lowered the relative unemployment rates of blacks in those counties where it is present, but to have had only a limited impact on relative incomes after the influences of other socio-economic variables were taken into account."

=== Wages ===
Walmart reports that in 2006 its workers earned an average of $10.11 per hour. Human Rights Watch estimates that this is below the average of $10.24 earned by workers at discount department stores, $10.55 at warehouse clubs and supercenters, and $11.12 at grocery stores. Walmart managers are judged, in part, based on their ability to control payroll costs. The Wall Street Journal says this puts extra pressure on higher-paid workers to be more productive. Walmart insists its wages are generally in line with the current local market in retail labor.

Other critics have noted that in 2001, the average wage for a Walmart Sales Clerk was $8.23 per hour, or $13,861 a year, while the federal poverty line for a family of three was $14,630. Walmart founder Sam Walton once said, "I pay low wages. I can take advantage of that. We're going to be successful, but the basis is a very low-wage, low-benefit model of employment."

In August 2006, Walmart announced that it would roll out an average pay increase of 6% for all new hires at 1,200 United States Walmart and Sam's Club locations, but at the same time would institute pay caps on veteran workers. While Walmart maintains that the measures are necessary to stay competitive, critics believe that the salary caps are primarily an effort to push higher-paid veteran workers out of the company.

In 2008, Walmart agreed to pay at least $352 million to settle lawsuits claiming that it forced employees to work off the clock. "Several lawyers described it as the largest settlement ever for lawsuits over wage violations."

Because Walmart employs part-time and relatively low paid workers, some workers may partially qualify for state welfare programs. This has led critics to claim that Walmart increases the burden on taxpayer-funded services. A 2002 survey by the state of Georgia's subsidized healthcare system, PeachCare, found that Walmart was the largest private employer of parents of children enrolled in its program; one quarter of the employees of Georgia Walmarts qualified to enroll their children in the federal subsidized healthcare system Medicaid. A 2004 study at the University of California, Berkeley charges that Walmart's low wages and benefits are insufficient, and although decreasing the burden on the social safety net to some extent, California taxpayers still pay $86 million a year to Walmart employees.

On September 4, 2008, the Mexican Supreme Court of Justice ruled that Walmart de Mexico, the Mexican subsidiary of Walmart, must cease paying its employees in part with vouchers redeemable only at Walmart stores.

In July 2016, some workers in China went on unofficial strike at Walmart stores in Nanchang, Jiangxi Province, Chengdu, Sichuan Province, and Harbin, Heilongjiang Province against the company's new working-hours scheduling system. The striking workers protested the system, which allowed managers to schedule an unlimited number of hours per day totalling up to 174 hours per month without overtime pay. According to Walmart, workers could either opt into the new schedule or keep their original shifts, but pointed out that the new scheduling, which Walmart claim most workers they had contacted supported, allowed employees to work more shifts if they choose. Chinese Walmart staff accused the country's only officially recognised union, the All-China Federation of Trade Unions (ACFTU), as being apathetic to their cause and unreceptive to workers' opinions. The ACFTU had previously signed an agreement with the company in 2006 that allowed Walmart to set up management-controlled unions instead. The union asked for the workers to return to their jobs. Reuters reported that by July 8, 2016, the striking workers returned to work when management agreed to consider their protests. Later it was reported that OUR Walmart provided strategic advice to the Walmart Chinese Workers Association (WCWA) prior to the strikes in China.

In January 2018, Walmart announced the increase of the minimum wage for its U.S. employees to $11 per hour.

=== Working conditions ===
Walmart has faced accusations involving poor working conditions for its employees. For example, a 2005 class action lawsuit in Missouri asserted approximately 160,000 to 200,000 people who were forced to work off-the-clock, were denied overtime pay, or were not allowed to take rest and lunch breaks. In 2000, Walmart paid $50 million to settle a class-action suit that asserted that 69,000 current and former Walmart employees in Colorado had been forced to work off-the-clock. The company has also faced similar lawsuits in other states, including Pennsylvania, Oregon, and Minnesota. Class-action suits were also filed in 1995 on behalf of full-time Walmart pharmacists whose base salaries and working hours were reduced as sales declined, resulting in the pharmacists being treated like hourly employees.

Beginning in 2001, a lawsuit on behalf of 1.5 million women workers at Walmart was filed against the company, alleging that the company followed rules and practices that discriminated against women when it came to pay and promotions. Beginning in 2005, the class-action suit Dukes v. Walmart Stores, Inc. was heard by the United States Court of Appeals for the Ninth Circuit. Sociologist Dr. William Bielby provided expert opinion on the case, in which he evaluated Walmart's employment policies and corporate culture "against what social science research shows to be factors that create and sustain bias and those that minimize bias" and claimed there was gender bias. In 2011, for the U.S. Supreme Court case Walmart v. Dukes, U.S. Supreme Court Justice Antonin Scalia rejected Bielby's testimony, saying it was "worlds away" from proof. The Supreme Court threw out the lawsuit in a 5–4 vote, ruling that the plaintiffs did not meet the rules to proceed as a class.

On October 16, 2006, approximately 200 workers on the morning shift at a Walmart Super Center in Hialeah Gardens, Florida, walked out in protest against new store policies and rallied outside the store, shouting "We want justice" and criticizing the company's recent policies as "inhuman". This marks the first time that Walmart had faced a worker-led revolt of such scale, according to both employees and the company. Reasons for the revolt included cutting full-time hours, a new attendance policy, and pay caps that the company imposed in August 2006, compelling workers to be available to work any shift (day, swing or night), and that shifts would be assigned by computers at corporate headquarters and not by local managers. Walmart quickly held talks with the workers, addressing their concerns. Walmart asserts that its policy permits associates to air grievances without fear of retaliation.

A 2004 report by Democratic United States Representative George Miller alleged that in ten percent of Walmart's stores, nighttime employees were locked inside, holding them prisoner. There has been some concern that Walmart's policy of locking its nighttime employees in the building has been implicated in a longer response time to dealing with various employee emergencies, or weather conditions such as hurricanes in Florida. Walmart said this policy was to protect the workers and the store's contents in high-crime areas and acknowledges that some employees were inconvenienced in some instances for up to an hour as they had trouble locating a manager with the key. However, fire officials confirm that at no time were fire exits locked or employees blocked from escape. Walmart has advised all stores to ensure the door keys are available on site at all times.

In January 2004, The New York Times reported on an internal Walmart audit, conducted in July 2000, which examined one week's time-clock records for roughly 25,000 employees. According to the Times, the audit, "pointed to extensive violations of child-labor laws and state regulations requiring time for breaks and meals", including 1,371 instances of minors working too late, during school hours, or for too many hours in a day. There were 60,767 missed breaks and 15,705 lost meal times. Walmart's vice president for communications responded that company auditors had determined that the methodology used by The New York Times was flawed, and the company "did not respond to it in any way internally." Walmart has been accused of allowing undocumented workers to work in its stores. In one case, federal investigators say Walmart executives knew that contractors were using undocumented workers as they had been helping the federal government with an investigation for the previous three years. Some critics said that Walmart directly hired undocumented workers, while Walmart says they were employed by contractors who won bids to work for Walmart.

On October 23, 2003, federal agents raided 61 Walmart stores in 21 United States states in a crackdown known as "Operation Rollback", resulting in the arrests of 250 nightshift janitors who were undocumented. Following the arrests, a grand jury convened to consider charging Walmart executives with labor racketeering crimes for knowingly allowing undocumented workers to work at their stores. The workers themselves were employed by agencies Walmart contracted with for cleaning services. Walmart blamed the contractors, but federal investigators point to wiretapped conversations showing that executives knew some workers did not have the correct documentation. The October 2003 raid was not the first time Walmart was found using unauthorized workers. Earlier raids in 1998 and 2001 resulted in the arrests of 100 workers without documentation located at Walmart stores around the country.

In November 2005, 125 alleged undocumented workers were arrested while working on construction of a new Walmart distribution center in eastern Pennsylvania. According to Walmart, the workers were employees of Walmart's construction subcontractor.

=== Allegations of wrongful termination ===
On January 13, 2011, four employees at a Walmart in Layton, Utah were confronted by a shoplifter who pulled out a handgun and took one of the employees hostage in an attempt to leave a small, closed office. The other three employees disarmed and subdued the shoplifter, and all four held onto the man until police arrived. A week later, the four employees were fired for violating a company policy requiring employees to "disengage" and "withdraw" from any situation involving a weapon. The four fired employees, together with two other Walmart employees who had been fired after subduing violent customers, sued Walmart in the United States federal court in June 2011. After the Utah Supreme Court ruled (in response to a request from a federal judge) that Utah law prohibited the firing of workers for defending themselves from injury or death, Walmart and the workers settled the case on undisclosed terms.

On July 9, 2013, an employee at a Walmart in Kemptville, Ontario, confronted a customer who had left his dog locked in his truck with the windows rolled up. She called the police when the customer refused to solve the problem. She was fired later the same day, reportedly on the grounds of "being rude to a customer", after rejecting instructions from her manager that such incidents should be reported to the store management rather than directly to the police.

The National Labor Relations Board (NLRB) has long had the goal of protecting workers, whether unionized or not, who engage in concerted activity by speaking with each other regarding conditions, wages, and/or benefits. The NLRB has recently stated that this also applies to social media. The key point is whether or not the intent appears to be to communicate with fellow employees. And Walmart's official policy is viewed as acceptable and not overly restrictive in this regard, revised in part after consultations with the NLRB. However, in practice, Walmart may not always follow such a policy. For example, a September 2013 article in The Atlantic Wire, reports the case of a 17-year veteran of Walmart's Paramount, California location who started at $5.50 an hour as an overnight stocker and became a manager in housewares. "For 14 years I was a model associate", he states. In 2012, he became increasingly involved with OUR Walmart and was fired in May 2013. He reports that after he began speaking about labor conditions "they started silencing me, by holding me to standards that they weren't holding other associates to. We were so understaffed, and the workload placed on me [was] unsurmountable."

=== Health insurance ===
According to a September 2002 survey by the state of Georgia, one in four children of Walmart employees were enrolled in PeachCare for Kids, the state's health-insurance program for uninsured children, compared to the state's second-biggest employer, Publix, which had one child in the program for every 22 children of employees. A December 2004 nationwide survey commissioned by Walmart showed that the use of public-assistance health-care programs by children of Walmart workers was at a similar rate to other retailers' employees, and at rates similar to the United States population as a whole.

As of October 2005, Walmart's health insurance covered 44% or approximately 572,000 of its 1.3 million United States workers. In comparison, Walmart rival and wholesaler Costco insures approximately 85% of its workers. In 2003 Walmart spent an average of $3,500 per employee for health care, 27% less than the retail-industry average of $4,800. When asked why so many Walmart workers choose to enroll in state health care plans instead of Walmart's own plan, Walmart CEO Lee Scott acknowledged that some states' benefits may be more generous than Walmart's own plan: "In some of our states, the public program may actually be a better value – with relatively high income limits to qualify, and low premiums." Critics of Walmart say in Walmart: The High Cost of Low Price that employees are paid so little they cannot afford health insurance.

On October 26, 2005, a Walmart internal memo sent to the firm's board of directors advised trimming over $1 billion in health care expenses by 2011 through measures such as attracting a younger, implicitly healthier work force by offering education benefits. The memo also suggested giving sedentary Walmart staffers, such as cashiers, more physically demanding tasks, such as "cart-gathering", and eliminating full-time positions in favor of hiring part-time employees who would be ineligible for the more expensive health insurance and several policy proposals which may violate the Americans with Disabilities Act of 1990. The memo also accused Walmart's lower paid employees of abusing emergency room visits, "possibly due to their prior experience with programs such as Medicaid", whereas such visits may actually be due to the reduced ability of uninsured or underinsured people to make timely appointments to see a regular physician.

On January 12, 2006, the Maryland legislature enacted a law requiring that all corporations with more than 10,000 employees in the state spend at least eight percent of their payroll on employee benefits, or pay into a state fund for the uninsured. Walmart, with about 17,000 employees in Maryland, was the only known company to not meet this requirement before the bill passed. On July 7, 2006, the Maryland law was overturned in federal court by a United States District judge who held that a federal law, the Employee Retirement Income Security Act (ERISA), preempted the Maryland law. The judge said the law would "hurt Walmart by imposing the administrative burden of tracking benefits in Maryland differently than in other states."

On April 17, 2006, Walmart announced it was making a health care plan available to part-time workers after one year of service, instead of the prior two-year requirement. By January 2007, the number of workers enrolled in the company's health care plans increased by 8%, which Walmart attributed to the introduction of less expensive insurance policies. However, even with this increase, less than half of Walmart's employees, or 47.4%, received health insurance through the company, with 10%, or 130,000, receiving no coverage at all.

In March 2008, Walmart sued a former Walmart employee, Deborah Shank, to recover the money it spent for her health care after she was brain-damaged, restricted to a wheelchair, and nursing home-bound after her minivan was hit by a truck. Walmart sued the former employee for $470,000 after she received a settlement from the accident, citing that company policy forbids employees from receiving coverage if they also win a settlement in a lawsuit. After a wave of bad publicity, Walmart dropped its suit.

In 2011, Walmart stopped providing health insurance for part-time employees working under 24 hours per week. In 2013, health insurance benefits will not be available to employees who work fewer than 30 hours per week. Experts in labor and health care observed that the change will shift the burden of providing health care for Walmart employees to the federal government, as eligibility for Medicaid has been expanded under the Patient Protection and Affordable Care Act (PPACA or ACA). An analysis of Walmart's health plans as compared to plans offered in the ACA's health insurance marketplaces found that Walmart's plans have larger networks of providers than most plans in the marketplaces, and that gross premiums (before accounting for tax credits) are less expensive under Walmart's plans.

In October 2014, Walmart announced that they were cutting benefits for all associates working under 30 hours a week, which is said to affect roughly 30,000 (2%) of Walmart's workforce. The company acknowledged a $500 million jump in health care expenses as the primary reason for their decision. Walmart executive Sally Welborn stated in a blog post, "This year, the expenses were significant and led us to make some tough decisions as we begin our annual enrollment."

=== Labor union opposition ===
Walmart has been criticized for its policies against labor unions. Critics blame workers' reluctance to join the labor union on Walmart anti-union tactics such as managerial surveillance and pre-emptive closures of stores or departments who choose to unionize. Walmart claims that it is not anti-union but "pro-associate", arguing that its employees do not need to pay third parties to discuss problems with management as the company's open-door policy enables employees to lodge complaints and submit suggestions all the way up the corporate ladder. In 1970, Walmart's late founder Sam Walton resisted a unionization push by the Retail Clerks International Union in two small Missouri towns by hiring a professional union buster to conduct an anti-union campaign. On the union buster's advice, Walton also took steps to show his workers how the company had their best interests in mind, encouraging them to air concerns with managers and implementing a profit-sharing program. A few years later, Walmart hired a consulting firm, Alpha Associates, to develop a union avoidance program.

In 2000, meat cutters in Jacksonville, Texas, voted to unionize. Walmart subsequently eliminated in-house meat-cutting jobs in favor of prepackaged meats, claiming that the measure would cut costs and prevent lawsuits. Walmart said that the nationwide closing of in-store meat packaging had been planned for many years and was not related to the unionization. In June 2003, a National Labor Relations Board judge ordered Walmart to restore the meat department to its prior structure, complete with meat-cutting, and to recognize and bargain with the union over the effects of any change to case-ready meat sales.

Walmart's anti-union policies also extend beyond the United States. The documentary Walmart: The High Cost of Low Price, shows one successful unionization of a Walmart store in Jonquière, Quebec, Canada, in 2004, but Walmart closed the store five months later because the company did not approve of the new "business plan" a union would require. In September 2005, the Québec Labor Board ruled that the closing of a Walmart store amounted to a reprisal against unionized workers and has ordered additional hearings on possible compensation for the employees, though it offered no details.

In March 2005, Walmart executive Tom Coughlin was forced to resign from its board of directors, facing charges of embezzlement. Coughlin said that the money was used for an anti-union project involving cash bribes paid to employees of the United Food and Commercial Workers Union in exchange for a list of names of Walmart employees that had signed union cards. He also said that the money was unofficially paid to him, by Walmart, as compensation for his anti-union efforts. In August 2006, Coughlin pleaded guilty to stealing money, merchandise, and gift cards from Walmart, but avoided prison time due to his poor health. He was sentenced to five years probation and required to pay a $50,000 fine and $411,000 in restitution to Walmart and the Internal Revenue Service. A United States attorney has stated that no evidence was found to back up Coughlin's initial claims, and Walmart continues to deny the existence of the anti-union program, though Coughlin himself apparently restated those claims to reporters after his conviction.

Walmart has also had some run-ins with the German Ver.di labor union as well. These issues, combined with cultural differences and low performing stores, led Walmart to pull out of the German market entirely in 2006.

In August 2006, Walmart announced that it would allow workers at all of its Chinese stores to become members of trade unions, and that the company would work with the state-sanctioned All-China Federation of Trade Unions (ACFTU) on representation for its 28,000 staff. However, the All-China Federation of Trade Unions has been criticized because it is the only trade union in China and as a tool of the government, ACFTU has been seen as not acting in the best interest of its members (workers), bowing to government pressure on industry growth and not defending workers' rights.

In November 2012, the United Food & Commercial Workers joined with several Walmart workers with a plan to go on strike on Black Friday at several stores nationwide in protest to low pay, an increase in health insurance premiums, and not being given the option to have the day off or having Thanksgiving off. Walmart has countered this by saying that the strike is illegal due to the union not being sanctioned by the company, and that the striking workers are a small minority of the company's workforce, with the vast majority of workers willing and ready to work the retail industry's busiest day of the year.

In May 2013, Walmart employees associated with a union-backed labor group called OUR Walmart began what it says will be the first "prolonged strikes" in Walmart's history.

For Thanksgiving 2013, CNN estimates that approximately a million United States Walmart employees would work over the course of the holiday, with big specials starting at 6:00 PM on Thanksgiving Day. The company stated that employees would receive "a nice Thanksgiving dinner at work", extra "holiday pay", and 25% discount off one purchase, regardless of how many items are purchased at that time. According to the Cleveland Plain Dealer, the extra holiday pay equaled the average daily shift the employee worked during the previous two weeks. Walmart would also expand its one-hour guarantee from three items the year before to twenty-one items. This means that a customer standing in line for such an item from 6–7 pm or from 8–9 pm would be guaranteed to get it at that price some point before Christmas.

In July 2019, the Walmart subreddit was flooded with pro-union memes in a protest to the firing of an employee who posted confidential material to the subreddit. Many of these posts were angry with Walmart surveying its staff on the Internet. The posting of the union content is in a response to the aforementioned alleged anti-union position Walmart has taken in the past.

=== Surveillance patent ===
In July 2018, Walmart was granted a patent titled "Listening to the Frontend" for audio surveillance technology that could allow it to record employees as well as its shoppers. The company says the technology could help it boost worker productivity by generating performance metrics for each employee based on cashier area sounds, such as checkout scanner beeps, and even conversations. It would not say whether it plans to actually implement the multi-sensor system.

=== Gender and sexual orientation ===
In 2007, a gender discrimination lawsuit, Dukes v. Walmart Stores, Inc., was filed against Walmart, alleging that female employees were discriminated against in matters regarding pay and promotions. A class action suit was sought, which would have been the nation's largest in history, covering 1.5 million past and current employees. On June 20, 2011, the United States Supreme Court ruled in Walmart's favor, stating that the plaintiffs did not have enough in common to constitute a class. The court ruled unanimously that because of the variability of the plaintiffs' circumstances, the class action could not proceed as presented, and furthermore, in a 5–4 decision that it could not proceed as any kind of class action suit. Several plaintiffs, including the lead plaintiff, Betty Dukes, expressed their intent to file individual discrimination lawsuits separately.

According to a consultant hired by plaintiffs in a sex discrimination lawsuit, in 2001, Walmart's EEOC filings showed that female employees made up 65 percent of Walmart's hourly paid workforce, but only 33 percent of its management. Just 35 percent of its store managers were women, compared to 57 percent at similar retailers. Walmart says comparisons with other retailers are unfair, because it classifies employees differently; if department managers were included in the totals, women would make up 60 percent of the managerial ranks. Others have criticized the lawsuit as without basis in the law and as an abuse of the class action mechanism. In 2007, Walmart was named by the National Association for Female Executives as one of the top 35 companies for Executive Women.

Walmart's rating on the Human Rights Campaign's Corporate Equality Index, a measure of how companies treat LGBT employees and customers, has increased greatly during the past decade. The company was praised for expanding its anti-discrimination policy protecting gay and lesbian employees, as well as for a new definition of "family" that included same-sex partners. However, they have been criticized by the HRC in other areas, such as not renewing its membership in the National Gay and Lesbian Chamber of Commerce.

In January 2006, Walmart announced that "diversity efforts include new groups of minority, female and gay employees that meet at Walmart headquarters in Bentonville to advise the company on marketing and internal promotion. There are seven Business Resource Groups: women, African-Americans, Hispanics, Asians, Native Americans, Gays and Lesbians, and a disabled group."

Racism

In 2017, Walmart featured a wig on their website that was described with a racial slur in reference to the wig's shade of brown. This sparked much criticism and controversy on Twitter for being racist. Walmart made the item unavailable shortly after the controversy began.

== Poorly run and understaffed stores ==
In 2015, the Walmart CEO acknowledged a need for Walmart to refocus on cleanliness and tidiness, restocking shelves quickly, integration with digital, sideline businesses such as gas stations and care clinics, better selection such as in fresh produce, and correcting the situation in which Walmart prices were not always as low as those of competitors.

In a January 2012 article in the Harvard Business Review, Professor Zeynep Ton stated, "Moreover, the financial benefits of cutting employees are direct, immediate, and easy to measure, whereas the less-desirable effects are indirect, long term, and difficult to measure." A lot of retailers, including Walmart, evaluate managers by a ratio of sales to payroll expense. Managers do not have direct control over sales, almost never making decisions on merchandise mix, layout, or pricing. However, they very much have direct control over payroll and when sales numbers drop, such managers are quick to reduce payroll. That is, labor ends up being treated as a cost driver rather than a sales driver. At times, these pressures have even been such that Walmart managers placed pressure on employees to "work off the clock," a form of wage theft. As counter examples of companies which are both price leaders and invest in their employees, Prof. Ton points to QuikTrip convenience stores, Mercadona and Trader Joe's supermarkets, and Costco wholesale clubs.

In February 2013, Walmart received an American Customer Satisfaction Index rating of 71 as compared to 81 for Target, placing Walmart last for the year among retail and department stores. According to Bloomberg News, this marks the sixth year in a row Walmart has either finished last or tied for last.

According to a March 2013 Bloomberg News article, during the last five years Walmart added 455 United States stores for a 13% increase. During this same period, its overall United States employees including Sam's Clubs employees went down ever so slightly at 1.4% which translates to a reduction of 20,000 employees. In Wisconsin, an employee who oversees grocery deliveries and who is a member of OUR Walmart reports that the store is a long way from the previous mantra of "in the door and to the floor." Instead, merchandise ready for the sales floor remains on pallets and in steel bins in the back of the store with "no passable aisles." Professor Zeynep Ton states that companies can get in a downward spiral where too few labor hours lead to operational problems and lower sales and these reduced sales then become a rationale to reduce labor hours even further. "It requires a wake-up call at a higher level," she said. A customer from Delaware states that the cosmetics section "looked like someone raided it" and "You hate to see a company self-destruct, but there are other places to go." A customer in California states, "You wait 20, 25 minutes for someone to help you, then the person was not trained on mixing paint. It was like, you have to help them help you."

An April 3, 2013 The New York Times article cites Supermarket News that Walmart's grocery prices are usually about 15 percent cheaper than competitors. At the start of 2007, the company had an average of 338 employees for each Walmart and Sam's Club store in the United States, and by April 2013, this had reduced to an average of 281 employees per store. Terrie Ellerbee, associate editor of grocery publication The Shelby Report, traced the problem to 2010 when Walmart reduced the number of different merchandise items carried in an attempt to make stores less cluttered. Customers did not like this change, and Walmart added the merchandise back, but did not add employees back.

An April 5, 2013, article in the Consumerist includes photographs of Walmart shelves which are only partially stocked, primarily in health and beauty products. One employee is quoted as saying, "As soon as we get a full crew we start to lose people through them quitting or being fired. Management seems to wait until we need 6 or 7 people, then we get a rash of new hires." And another employee is quoted as saying, "they make the rest of us work faster and harder, saying the task manager system, which is basically a [point-of-sale] system telling them how long it should take us to do our job, says we should be done already or we're taking too long."

An April 9, 2013 article in Time Business & Money reported that some Walmart stores have cut labor hours so much that they were having trouble physically moving merchandise from the back onto stores shelves. However, even with these problems, Walmart was performing better than Target in the measure of retail turnover, turning over its entire inventory 8 times a year as compared to 6.4 for Target. Walmart states it has 90% to 95% in-stock, but given inventory levels in United States stores, even this means the company could be foregoing $1.29 billion to $2.58 billion in potential sales. The article's author writes that no amount of "computer wizardry" will eliminate the need for human beings to also move merchandise onto shelves. The author further writes that Walmart's whole business model is based on reducing the carrying costs of unsold merchandise, and any speed bump along the line adds back costs. Front-end managers are supposed to open another register any time there are more than three customers in line, but these employees have to come from some other part of the store, and the night crew may or may not be able to catch up.

In September 2013, Bloomberg Businessweek reported that Walmart will be offering 35,000 part-time employees full-time jobs and will be offering another 35,000 temporary employees permanent part-time positions. Walmart will also be looking to hire 55,000 seasonal employees for the upcoming holiday season. This compares to 120,000 jobs Walmart has cut over the last five years. This number does conflict with the 20,000 jobs cut from the above Bloomberg News of March 2013.

For Thanksgiving 2013 specials, Walmart included twenty-one items which included a one-hour guarantee, where customers would pay at that time and then go online to arrange delivery to a store of their choice by Christmas. However, there were problems and delays for some customers when they went online to register their access codes and paid gift certificates.

In February 2014, a local NBC affiliate in Troy, Alabama, United States, showed photographs of empty shelves and aired customer complaints, with one customer stating, "And merchandise? When you don't have any salt on the shelf, no matter what brand, that's pretty bad." Regarding the cleanliness and repair of restrooms, another customer stated, "The bathrooms? They have things that are broken in there and instead of fixing the problem, they have a trash bag taped over it, and it smells horrible." The reporter who was taking photographs was approached by three persons who identified themselves as managers and escorted out of the store. Within 24 hours, perhaps motivated by the fact that the story did appear on TV, Walmart's corporate office sent additional employees from neighboring stores to this store.

== No AEDs in stores (automated external defibrillators) ==
Many Walmart stores have no AEDs, which has led to criticism from those who have needed them whilst in their premises.

In 2011, the Walmart store in Kirksville, Missouri, had an opportunity to participate in a local program which placed 26 AEDs in various schools, churches, and businesses. The local store management was initially open to participation. However, Walmart corporate declined to participate.

In 2015 in Saskatoon, Canada, a 62-year-old man had a heart attack in a parking lot of a Walmart store. Two off-duty nurses who knew CPR offered assistance, whilst a third person ran to a different store to get that store's AED machine, and the man survived. The man's family criticized Walmart for not having an AED machine. The director of corporate affairs for Walmart Canada said the store has an employee on shift who is trained in first aid and CPR as is required by Canadian law, and that the company is in the process deciding whether or not to place AEDs in stores.

In 2018 in Alberta, Canada, a woman shopping with her adult daughters had a heart attack at a Walmart store. The 911 operator instructed one daughter to find an AED machine. The employee at the Walmart customer service desk did not know whether or not the store had one. Alberta law does not require AEDs in businesses, and Walmart stores in Alberta do not have them. The woman was not able to be resuscitated and died.

== Imports and globalization ==
As a large customer to most of its vendors, Walmart openly uses its bargaining power to bring lower prices to attract its customers. The company negotiates lower prices from vendors. For certain basic products, Walmart "has a clear policy" that prices go down from year to year. If a vendor does not keep prices competitive with other suppliers, they risk having their brand removed from Walmart's shelves in favor of a lower-priced competitor.

While Sam Walton was alive, Walmart had a "Buy American" campaign, but it was exposed shortly after he died that signs saying "Buy American" were on bins of Asian made products. Yet by 2005, about 60% of Walmart's merchandise was imported, compared to 6% in 1984, although others estimated the percentage was 40% from the beginning. In 2004, Walmart spent $18 billion on Chinese products alone, and if it were an individual economy, the company would rank as China's eighth largest trading partner, ahead of Russia, Australia, and Canada. One group estimates that the growing United States trade deficit with China, heavily influenced by Walmart imports, is estimated to have moved over 1.5 million jobs that might otherwise be in the United States to China between 1989 and 2003. According to the American Federation of Labor and Congress of Industrial Organizations (AFL–CIO), "Walmart is the single largest importer of foreign-produced goods in the United States", their biggest trading partner is China, and their trade with China alone constitutes approximately 10% of the total United States trade deficit with China as of 2004.

=== Overseas labor concerns ===
Walmart has been criticized for not providing adequate supervision of its foreign suppliers. It has also been criticized for using sweatshops and prison labor. In 1995, Chinese dissident Harry Wu charged that Walmart was contracting prison labor in Guangdong Province. Walmart said it did not use prison labor. There have also been reports of teenagers in Bangladesh working in sweatshops 80 hours per week at $0.14 per hour, for Walmart supplier Beximco. The documentary film Walmart: The High Cost of Low Price shows images of Walmart goods-producing factories in poor condition, and factory workers subject to abuse and conditions that the documentary producers considered inhumane.

Walmart currently uses monitoring which critics say is inadequate and "leaves outsiders unable to verify" conditions. Since Walmart will not release its audits or factory names, outside organizations are expected to simply accept Walmart's claims as fact. Critics suggest an agency such as Social Accountability International or the Fair Labor Association should do the monitoring. In 2004, Walmart began working with Business for Social Responsibility, a San Francisco, California-based nonprofit organization, to reach out to groups active in monitoring overseas plants.

In June 2006, Walmart was excluded from the investment portfolio of The Government Pension Fund of Norway, which held stock values of about $430 million in the company, due to a social audit into alleged labor rights violations in Walmart operations in the United States, Canada, Latin America, Africa, and Asia. Although Walmart did not respond to questions from the fund's auditors, it later said the decision "[does not] appear to be based on complete information".

On November 24, 2012, a fire in a Bangladesh clothing factory resulted in the death of 112 workers. Survivors said that fire extinguishers did not work, an exit door was locked, and that when the fire alarm went off, bosses told workers to return to their sewing machines. Victims were trapped or jumped to their deaths from the eight-story building, which had no fire escapes or exits. Initially Walmart said it could not confirm that it had ever sourced apparel from the factory. However photos taken by Bangladeshi labor activists showed Walmart-branded clothing present in the factory after the fire. Walmart later said that a supplier had subcontracted work to the factory "in direct violation of our policies." However, on December 4, documents revealed that at least five supplier companies had been using the Bangladesh factory to provide apparel for Walmart and its subsidiary Sam's Club during the past year. It was also disclosed in a November 24 article in The New York Times that officials who had attended a 2011 Bangladesh meeting to discuss factory safety in the garment industry said that the Walmart official there had played the lead role in blocking an effort to have global retailers pay more for apparel to help Bangladesh factories improve their electrical and fire safety.

=== Allegations of bribery and coverup in Mexico ===
In 2012, The New York Times reported that Walmart had been made aware eight years earlier that executives of Walmart México, its subsidiary in that country, had paid millions of dollars in bribes to local officials to expedite permits for construction and operation of its many stores in that country. The company had opened many stores in Mexico in the late 1990s and early 2000s, attempting to widely establish itself before competitors could. Sergio Cicero, a lawyer who had been responsible for obtaining those permits and was bitter about being passed over for the position of general counsel with Walmart México provided the company's corporate general counsel's office with evidence showing that the company had made large payments to gestores, workers who deal with bureaucracies on behalf of citizens and businesses, with coded indications that the money was being passed on to officials to expedite permits.

Company officials hired a veteran FBI agent to conduct a preliminary inquiry, instead of hiring an outside law firm as it usually did for major inquiries, such as a similar one in 2003 which found that Walmart México had been helping high-volume customers evade that country's sales taxes. The special investigative team found evidence corroborating almost all of Cicero's allegations, and evidence suggesting that the bribery had been even more extensive, including $16 million in "donations" to local politicians and their organizations. They recommended opening a full investigation, and possibly notifying the Justice Department, as it appeared that both Mexican law and the United States Foreign Corrupt Practices Act (FCPA) had been violated.

Executives at Walmart México chafed at the investigation, reportedly complaining that that was how business was done in the country. They told their counterparts at corporate headquarters that the investigators were being too aggressive, and some of the company's top executives apparently agreed. Feeling Walmart had had enough bad publicity in recent years, they allowed the investigation to be concluded by a short report from José Luis Rodríguezmacedo, the head of Walmart México, who had himself been suspected of involvement. It largely blamed Cicero, claiming he had fabricated the allegations to conceal his own embezzlement from the company with the help of the gestores, one of whom was his wife's law partner. Some Walmart executives found the report incomplete and contradictory, but the investigation was closed. None of the Mexican executives investigated were ever disciplined, and some were even promoted afterwards.

In December 2011, several months before the story broke, Walmart announced it had begun an internal review of its FCPA compliance procedures. It was unclear how the Justice Department might respond. While the FCPA's five-year statute of limitations appeared to bar prosecution under that statute, falsified financial statements in the years since could be seen as obstruction of justice under the Sarbanes-Oxley Act, and acts taken to conceal the bribery investigation subsequent to 2007 could constitute conspiracy.

== Product selection ==
Walmart's product selection has been criticized by some groups in the past, primarily as viewed as a promotion of a particular ideology or as a response to its original rural, religious and conservative target market. In 2003, Walmart removed certain men's magazines from its shelves, such as Maxim, FHM, and Stuff, citing customer complaints regarding their sexual content. Later that year, it decided to partly obscure the covers of Cosmopolitan, Marie Claire, and Redbook on store shelves due to "customer concerns", and refused to stock an issue of Sports Illustrated's swimsuit special because it objected to one photograph.

Since 1991, Walmart has not carried music albums marked with the Recording Industry Association of America's (RIAA's) Parental Advisory Label (although it allows R-rated movies and M-rated video games), though it carries edited versions of such albums, with obscenities removed or overdubbed with less offensive lyrics. In one example in 2005, Walmart rejected the original cover of country singer Willie Nelson's reggae album, Countryman, which featured marijuana leaves, in a pro-marijuana statement. To satisfy Walmart, the record label, Lost Highway Records, issued the album with an alternative cover, without recalling the original cover. In 2009 Green Day refused to make an edited version of their album 21st Century Breakdown for Walmart, with frontman Billie Joe Armstrong claiming "You feel like you're in 1953 or something", thus the album is not carried by Walmart. However albums carrying the label can be found in Canadian Walmart stores, for example.

In 1999, Walmart announced that it would not stock emergency contraception pills in its pharmacies, not citing any particular reasons except for a "business decision" that was made earlier. The move was criticized by family planning advocates, saying that women in small towns where Walmart pharmacies had little competition would have greater difficulties in obtaining the drug. The decision was challenged in 2006, as three Massachusetts women filed suit against the company after they were unable to purchase emergency contraception at their local Walmart stores, resulting in a ruling that required Walmart to stock the drug in all of its pharmacies in Massachusetts. Expecting that other states would soon do the same, Walmart reversed its policy and announced that it would begin to stock the drug nationwide, while at the same time maintaining its conscientious objection policy, allowing any Walmart pharmacy employee who does not feel comfortable dispensing a prescription to refer customers to another pharmacy.

Walmart has also been criticized for selling some controversial products. For example, in 2004 Walmart carried the anti-Semitic hoax The Protocols of the Elders of Zion in its online catalogue. The Jewish civil rights organization Anti-Defamation League wrote to the President of Walmart in September 2008 noting the text, "has been the major weapon in the arsenals of anti-Semites around the world", and called on Walmart to, "unequivocally state the nature of the book and to disassociate itself from any endorsement of it." Walmart stopped selling the book shortly thereafter.

In October 2004, Walmart canceled its order for The Daily Show's America (The Book) after discovering a page that depicts each US Supreme Court judge nude. A week later, it returned copies of comedian George Carlin's When Will Jesus Bring the Pork Chops?, with a cover recreating The Last Supper with Jesus' seat empty and Carlin seated next to it. The company said that the copies were shipped to it by mistake and a Walmart spokeswoman said she did not "believe this particular product would appeal" to its customer base.

In January 2006, Walmart was criticized for the recommendation system on its website which suggested that some black-related DVDs, such as Introducing Dorothy Dandridge and documentaries on Baptist minister and civil rights movement leader Martin Luther King Jr. were similar to the Planet of the Apes television series DVD box set. It quickly corrected the page, saying that it was a software glitch, but ultimately blamed the matter on human error.

A December 2007 report published by the Environmental Investigation Agency, a non-governmental agency, revealed that some furniture sold at Walmart was made from wood which had been illegally logged in protected Russian habitats for Siberian tigers and other wildlife. This led the company to investigate its suppliers and promise to eliminate products made from illegal wood by 2013. They also joined the Global Forest & Trade Network, an organization dedicated to eliminating illegal logging.

In 2015, Walmart stopped selling military-style semi-automatic rifles like the AR-15. In 2018 it stopped selling firearms and ammunition to 18-20 year olds, which led to a lawsuit.

In 2017, Walmart was sued for selling fake craft beer. The beer is labeled and marketed as being produced by the non-existent "Trouble Brewery" but is actually made by WX Brands, a large corporate brewery that also makes Genesee beer.

At the end of 2017, Walmart removed T-shirts which implied a promotion of violence, with the words "Rope. Tree. Journalist. Some Assembly Required". Executive Director Dan Shelley of the Radio Television Digital News Association said that while RTDNA is "a fierce proponent of the First Amendment that is politically nonpartisan" and that Walmart is within its legal rights to sell the T-shirt, "that doesn't mean it is the right thing to do." A Walmart spokesperson said the shirt "clearly violates our policy."

In May 2019, Walmart was sued by the Center For Inquiry (CFI) for selling homeopathic products on the shelf next to traditional medicine. The CFI, a not-for-profit educational organization, stated in the complaint that Walmart "uses marketing, labeling, and product placement to falsely present homeopathic products as equivalent alternatives to science-based medicines, and to represent homeopathic products as effective treatments for specific diseases and symptoms." Nicholas Little of CFI said that homeopathic products should remain legal to purchase, but should be labelled products honestly. The FDA currently does not regulate homeopathic products, but in recent years has signaled their intent to regulate the industry to a higher level. This follows on from a similar lawsuit filed by CFI against pharmacy chain CVS in 2018. Walmart responded by stating "Our Equate private label homeopathic products are designed to include information directly stating that the claims are not based on accepted medical evidence and have not been evaluated by the FDA. We take allegations like these seriously and will respond as appropriate with the court." In an August 2019 interview, Little commented that "The problem is the government agencies (the FDA and FTC) aren't doing their job. ... The FDA and FTC have rules and guidelines, but they don't enforce them." In July, 2019, CFI announced that the Stiefel Freethought Foundation was contributing an additional $150,000 to the previously committed $100,000 to support the two lawsuits.

== Taxes ==
Until the mid-1990s, Walmart took out corporate-owned life insurance policies on its employees including "low-level" employees such as janitors, cashiers, and stockers. This type of insurance is usually purchased to cover a company against financial loss when a high-ranking employee (i.e. management) dies, and is usually known as "key person insurance". Critics derided Walmart as buying what they called "dead peasants insurance" or "janitor insurance". Critics, as well as the United States Internal Revenue Service, charge that the company was trying to profit from the deaths of its employees, and take advantage of the tax law which allowed it to deduct the premiums. The practice was stopped in the mid-1990s when the federal government closed the tax deduction and began to pursue Walmart for back taxes.

== Animal welfare ==
Walmart committed in 2016 to only sourcing cage-free eggs by 2025. The "cage-free" label is inconsistent in the U.S. and is not the same as "free-range".

On November 28, 2016, Paola Gaviño in coordination with the animal protection NGOs, The Humane League and Mercy For Animals, launched a multinational campaign to raise awareness of Walmart's failure to produce a policy to source 100% cage-free eggs throughout Latin America. Walmart has not committed to phasing out battery cages in Latin America as it has in the United States, the United Kingdom, and Canada. The campaign argues that battery cages are unnecessarily cruel and also increase the risk of food safety issues, including an increased risk of Salmonella contamination.

Walmart Canada retracted its original 2025 cage-free deadline in 2022. As of May 2026, Walmart Canada has not published a new deadline. While both regions' 100% cage-free policies remain unfulfilled, Walmart Canada has reported only 9% cage-free progress—one-third of the fulfillment rate reported by its U.S. counterpart (27.7%).

== Midtown Walmart ==
Midtown Walmart was a proposal by Walmart to build a 203,000-square-foot (18,900 m^{2}) supercenter location on a 4.6-acre (1.9-hectare) site in the planned sub-district of Midtown Miami in the city of Miami, Florida, US.

Walmart's Midtown plan was rejected the first time in February 2013, but was redesigned by Gensler and approved by Miami Planning and Zoning Director Francisco Garcia in August 2013, then upheld on appeal by the City Commission in November 2013, Midtown Walmart faced public and political opposition from area residents, business owners, and community activists after being adapted to meet strict zoning regulations that resulted in the design differing from the typical layout, such as utilizing second story roof parking versus a surface lot with more street liner retail spaces instead of a wall perimeter.

The original 2013 plan included 550 parking spaces on two levels above the 184,000-square-foot (17,100 m^{2}) store.

Walmart did build urban locations in Santurce, (downtown) San Juan, Puerto Rico, known as "Plaza 18", as well as Washington, D.C., where the city's first Walmart is a true mixed-use development, with third party retail as well as 300 apartments above the store. Walmart's plan in Midtown Miami was not an urban store, but rather a suburban-style Super Center with parking in two floors above the ground level, instead of in an open lot. If built, it would be the first traditional Walmart location within the City of Miami limits, although there are numerous locations just outside city limits in Doral, Hialeah, Gladeview, North Miami Beach, and Westchester, as well as a "Neighborhood Market" in the western fringes of the city.

Purchased in October 2011, the retailer closed on the sale in January 2014 for US$8.2 million, the currently vacant site sits at the southern tip of Midtown between North Miami Avenue and Midtown Boulevard from Northeast 29th and 31st Streets, between the burgeoning neighborhoods of Wynwood and Edgewater.

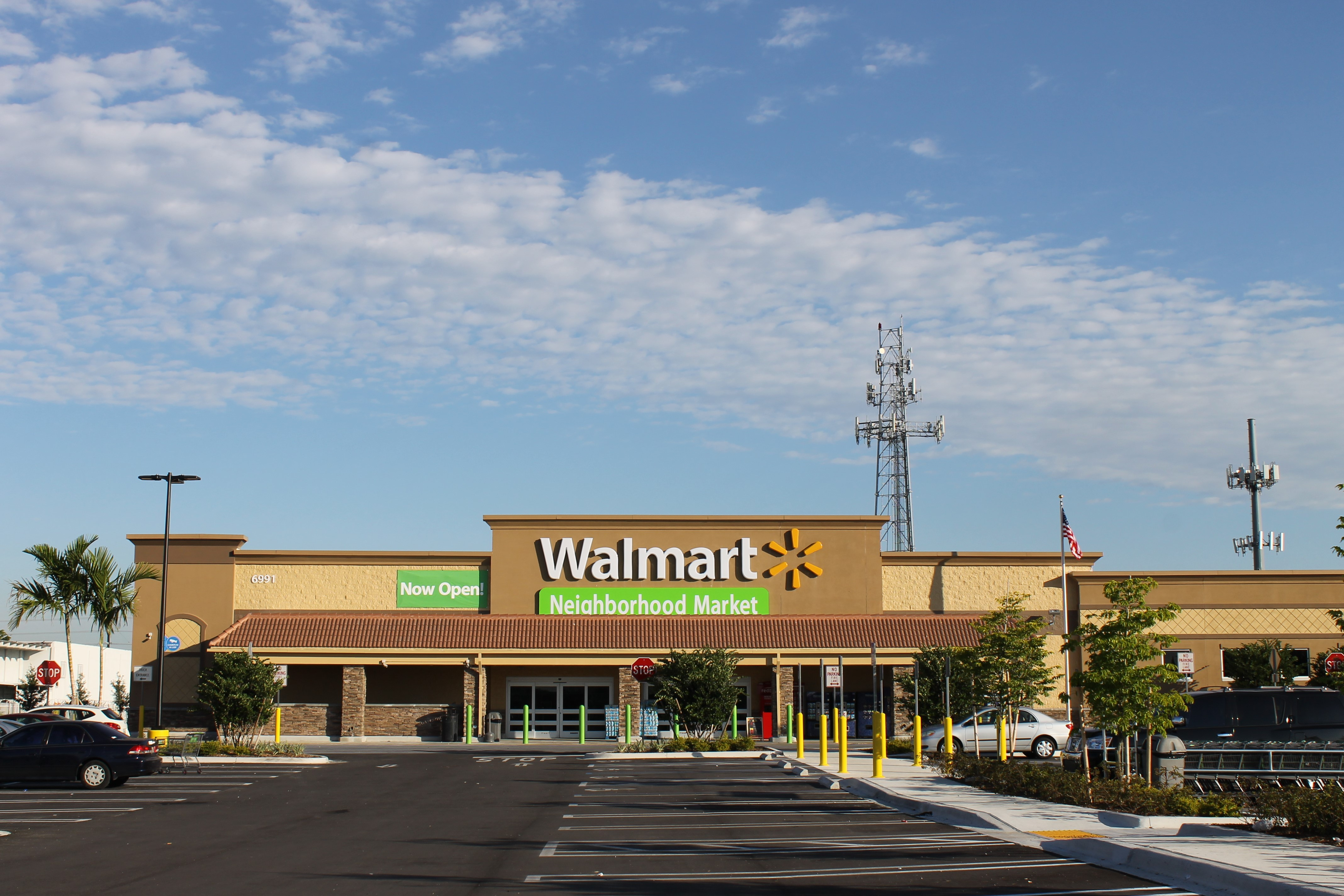
A Walmart Neighborhood Market in western fringes of the city

After two years of litigation, Walmart won their first court battle in August 2015. The litigation once again targeted the city's departure from the law by providing Walmart illegal zoning variances and the illegal street re-configuration caused by the development which would contribute excessively to local traffic problems.

The Midtown development contains a Target and a Ross.

The Walmart broke ground with an illegal permit from the City of Miami in January 2016, after a panel of state judges in the 3rd District Court of Appeals blocked a petition challenging the development.

In 2016, Stern won a judgment against the City of Miami in a public records lawsuit related to Walmart's plan to build in Midtown Miami. That case proved Stern's claims that Walmart did not hold good title to all the land upon which they obtained a permit to build from the city. As a result, the City of Miami froze their permit and eventually, construction of the Walmart was involuntarily halted when the City revoked their foundation permit on June 21, 2016, and construction ceased at the site within the week, which is how Walmart's vacant Midtown site remains.

In September 2019, Walmart sold its land for $26.4 million.

== Opioids settlement ==
On December 22, 2020, the United States Department of Justice filed an official complaint towards Walmart pharmacies for failing to comply with the Controlled Substances Act, by selling opioids and other restricted substances to its customers.

Under the presiding of former attorney general William Barr, the Walmart corporate and the United States Department of Justice and the Drug Enforcement Administration went to court in attempt to resolve the issue. Other pharmacies were also pulled into this legal case for similarly defying the Controlled Substances Act. Many large pharmaceutical companies, such as Walgreens, Sam's Club & CVS Pharmacy were included in this case.

Within the lawsuit, the United States Department of Justice argued that Walmart pressured pharmacists to refill as many prescriptions as fast as possible. They also argued that the all pharmacies in the United States have to comply with federal law before refilling a prescription. Walmart counter-argued that every individual pharmacist must make the decision to refill a prescription or not.

After deliberations, the jury sided with the United States Department of Justice. All the companies involved were forced to pay a total of 3.1 billion dollars in restitution and damages, and were banned from dispensing opioids to consumers.

Walmart has had further trouble with the Drug Enforcement Agency as well. In November 2009, Walmart pharmacies faced a DEA investigation over Walmart's CSA compliance. In November 2011, Walmart entered an agreement with the DEA requiring certain changes and controls to ensure compliance with CSA. It was alleged that the company's board was not monitoring the DEA settlement and that the company "emphasized profits over compliance", and that there were many red flags regarding non-compliance. Several lawsuits followed. In 2017, Walmart was a defendant in a Opioid multidistrict litigation.

In 2021 and 2022, further lawsuits by shareholders alleged that Walmart had breached their duties of ensuring compliance with the CSA and DEA settlement. Walmart's motion to dismiss the settlement was denied.

On December 20, 2024, in the case Ontario Provincial Council of Carpenters’ Pension Trust Fund, et al. v. S. Robson Walton, et al. over the historical failure of Walmart to implement legally mandated controls, the Delaware Court of Chancery approved a settlement that included 123 million dollars and Walmart's guarantee to maintain practices for at least 5 years. The settlement is the second largest settlement in a derivative oversight case in Delaware history.

These lawsuits are some of the largest measures taken by the federal government against a company over the opioid crisis.

== See also ==
- "Hell Comes to Quahog"
- Imminent lawless action
- People of Walmart
- "Propane Boom"
- "Something Wall-Mart This Way Comes"
- Walmarting
- Whirl-Mart
