= Astroturfing =

Public relations tactic using fake grassroots movements

Astroturfing is the practice of hiding the sponsors of an orchestrated message or organization to make it appear as though it originates from, and is supported by, unsolicited grassroots participants. It is a deceptive practice intended to give the statements or organizations credibility by withholding information about the source's financial backers.

The implication behind the use of the term is that instead of a "true" or "natural" grassroots effort behind the activity in question, there is a "fake" or "artificial" appearance of support. It is increasingly recognized as a problem in social media, e-commerce, and politics. Astroturfing can influence public opinion by flooding platforms like political blogs, news sites, and review websites with manipulated content. Some groups accused of astroturfing argue that they are legitimately helping citizen activists to make their voices heard.

Various detection methods have been developed by researchers, including content analysis, linguistic analysis, authorship attribution, and machine learning.

== Etymology ==
The word "grassroots" describes a natural, self-organizing movement run by the community. AstroTurf is a brand of artificial turf (grass); "astroturf" describes an artificial grassroots movement. The usage of the term "astroturf" is credited to former Treasury Secretary of the United States Lloyd Bentsen who, in 1985, when faced with a barrage of postcards and letters facilitated by insurance companies claiming to be concerned constituents, said that "a fellow from Texas can tell the difference between grass roots and Astroturf", referencing the brand of artificial grass.

== Definition ==
In political science, it is defined as the process of seeking electoral victory or legislative relief for grievances by helping political actors find and mobilize a sympathetic public, and is designed to create the image of public consensus where there is none. Astroturfing is the use of fake grassroots efforts that primarily focus on influencing public opinion and typically are funded by corporations and political entities to form opinions.

On the internet, "astroturfers" use software to hide their identity. Sometimes one individual operates through many personas to give the impression of widespread support for their client's agenda. Some studies suggest astroturfing can alter public viewpoints and create enough doubt to inhibit action. In the first systematic study of astroturfing in the United States, Oxford University Professor Philip N. Howard argued that the internet was making it much easier for lobbyists and political movements to activate small groups of aggrieved citizens to have an exaggerated importance in public policy debates. Astroturfed accounts on social media do not always require humans to write their posts; one January 2021 study detailed a "set of human-looking bot accounts" used to post political content, which was able to operate automatically for fourteen days (and make 1,586 posts) before being detected and suspended by Twitter. Twitter trends are often targeted by astroturfing as they are used as a proxy for popularity. A study conducted by researchers at EPFL reported that 20% of the global Twitter trends in 2019 were fake, created automatically using fake and compromised accounts which tweet in a coordinated way to mimic grassroots organizing of regular Twitter users.

== Policies and enforcement ==
Many countries have laws that prohibit the more overt astroturfing practices. In the United States, the Federal Trade Commission (FTC) may send cease-and-desist orders or require a fine of $16,000 per day for those that violate its "Guides Concerning the Use of Endorsements and Testimonials in Advertising". The FTC's guides were updated in 2009 to address social media and word-of-mouth marketing. According to an article in the Journal of Consumer Policy, the FTC's guides holds advertisers responsible for ensuring bloggers or product endorsers comply with the guides, and any product endorsers with a material connection are required to provide honest reviews.

In the European Union, the Unfair Commercial Practices Directive requires that paid-for editorial content provide a clear disclosure that the content is a sponsored advertisement. Additionally, it prohibits those with a material connection from misleading readers into thinking they are a regular consumer.

The United Kingdom has the Consumer Protection from Unfair Trading Regulations, which prohibits "falsely representing oneself as a consumer". They allow for up to two years in prison and unlimited fines for breaches. Additionally, the advertising industry in the UK has adopted many voluntary policies such as the Code of Non-Broadcast Advertising, Sale, Promotion and Direct Marketing. A trade association, the Advertising Standards Authority, investigates complaints of breaches. The policy requires that marketing professionals not mislead their audience, including by omitting a disclosure of their material connection.

In Australia, astroturfing is regulated by Section 18 of the Australian Consumer Law, which broadly prohibits "misleading and deceptive conduct". According to the Journal of Consumer Policy, Australia's laws, which were introduced in 1975, are more vague. In most cases, they are enforced through lawsuits from competitors, rather than the regulatory body, the Australian Competition & Consumer Commission. There is also an International Consumer Protection and Enforcement Network (ICPEN).

Legal regulations are primarily targeted towards testimonials, endorsements and statements as to the performance or quality of a product. Employees of an organization may be considered as acting as customers if their actions are not guided by authority within the company.

In October 2018, after denying that they had paid for people to show up in support of a controversial power plant development project in New Orleans, Entergy was fined $5 million for using astroturf firm The Hawthorn Group to provide actors to prevent real community members' voices from being heard at city council meetings and show false grassroots support.

== Debate ==
=== Effectiveness ===
In the book Grassroots for Hire: Public Affairs Consultants in American Democracy, Edward Walker defines "astroturfing" as public participation that is perceived as heavily invented, as fraudulent (claims are attributed to those who did not make such statements), or as an elite campaign masquerading as a mass movement. Although not all campaigns by professional grassroots lobbying consultants meet this definition, the book finds that the elite-sponsored grassroots campaigns often fail when they are not transparent about their sources of sponsorship and/or fail to develop partnerships with constituencies that have an independent interest in the issue. Walker highlights the case of Working Families for Wal-Mart, in which the campaign's lack of transparency led to its demise.

A study published in the Journal of Business Ethics examined the effects of websites operated by front groups on students. It found that astroturfing was effective at creating uncertainty and lowering trust about claims, thereby changing perceptions that tend to favor the business interests behind the astroturfing effort. The New York Times reported that "consumer" reviews are more effective, because "they purport to be testimonials of real people, even though some are bought and sold just like everything else on the commercial Internet." Some organizations feel that their business is threatened by negative comments, so they may engage in astroturfing to drown them out. Online comments from astroturfing employees can also sway the discussion through the influence of groupthink.

=== Justification ===
Some astroturfing operatives defend their practice. Regarding "movements that have organized aggressively to exaggerate their sway", author Ryan Sager said that this "isn't cheating. Doing everything in your power to get your people to show up is basic politics." According to a Porter/Novelli executive, "There will be times when the position you advocate, no matter how well framed and supported, will not be accepted by the public simply because you are who you are."

Groups like FreedomWorks and Americans for Prosperity assert that providing organizational structure and support to grassroots movements is essential for effective advocacy. They argue that the concept of grassroots movements being entirely spontaneous is unrealistic and that some level of organization is necessary to amplify voices and mobilize supporters effectively. These groups claim that their activities are legitimate and that they are simply providing the necessary backbone for authentic activism.

=== Impact on society ===
Data-mining expert Bing Liu (University of Illinois Chicago) estimated that one-third of all consumer reviews on the Internet are fake. According to The New York Times, this has made it hard to tell the difference between "popular sentiment" and "manufactured public opinion". According to an article in the Journal of Business Ethics, astroturfing threatens the legitimacy of genuine grassroots movements. The authors argued that astroturfing that is "purposefully designed to fulfill corporate agendas, manipulate public opinion and harm scientific research represents a serious lapse in ethical conduct." A 2011 report found that often paid posters from competing companies are attacking each other in forums and overwhelming regular participants in the process. George Monbiot said that persona-management software supporting astroturfing "could destroy the Internet as a forum for constructive debate". An article in the Journal of Consumer Policy said that regulators and policy makers needed to be more aggressive about astroturfing. The author said that it undermines the public's ability to inform potential customers of sub-standard products or inappropriate business practices, but also noted that fake reviews were difficult to detect.

== Techniques ==
Use of one or more front groups is one astroturfing technique. These groups typically present themselves as serving the public interest, while actually working on behalf of a corporate or political sponsor. Front groups may resist legislation and scientific consensus that is damaging to the sponsor's business by emphasizing minority viewpoints, instilling doubt and publishing counterclaims by corporate-sponsored experts. Fake blogs can also be created that appear to be written by consumers, while actually being operated by a commercial or political interest. Some political movements have provided incentives for members of the public to send a letter to the editor at their local paper, often using a copy and paste form letter that is published in dozens of newspapers verbatim. Mass letters may be printed on personalized stationery using different typefaces, colors and words to make them appear personal.

Another technique is the use of sockpuppets, where a single person creates multiple identities online to give the appearance of grassroots support. Sockpuppets may post positive reviews about a product, attack participants that criticize the organization, or post negative reviews and comments about competitors, under fake identities. Astroturfing businesses may pay staff based on the number of posts they make that are not flagged by moderators. Persona management software may be used so that each paid poster can manage five to seventy convincing online personas without getting them confused. Online astroturfing using sockpuppets is a form of Sybil attack against distributed systems.

Pharmaceutical companies may sponsor patient support groups and simultaneously push them to help market their products. Bloggers who receive free products, paid travel or other accommodations may also be considered astroturfing if those gifts are not disclosed to the reader. Analysts could be considered astroturfing, since they often cover their own clients without disclosing their financial connection. To avoid astroturfing, many organizations and press have policies about gifts, accommodations and disclosures.

Persona management software can age accounts and simulate the activity of attending a conference automatically to make it more convincing that they are genuine. At HBGary, employees were given separate thumb drives that contain online accounts for individual identities and visual cues to remind the employee which identity they are using at the time.

=== Detection ===
According to an article in The New York Times, the Federal Trade Commission rarely enforces its astroturfing laws. Operations are frequently detected if their profile images are recognized or if they are identified through the usage patterns of their accounts. Filippo Menczer's group at Indiana University developed software in 2010 that detects astroturfing on Twitter by recognizing behavioral patterns. Researchers are exploring other techniques of detecting astroturfing including machine learning, linguistic analysis, and content analysis.

== Business and adoption ==
According to an article in the Journal of Consumer Policy, academics disagree on how prolific astroturfing is.

According to Nancy Clark from Precision Communications, grass-roots specialists charge $25 to $75 for each constituent they convince to send a letter to a politician. Paid online commentators in China are purportedly paid 50 cents for each online post that is not removed by moderators, leading to the nickname of the "50-cent party". The New York Times reported that a business selling fake online book reviews charged $999 for 50 reviews and made $28,000 a month shortly after opening.

According to the Financial Times, astroturfing is "commonplace" in American politics, but was "revolutionary" in Europe when it was exposed that the European Privacy Association, an anti-privacy "think-tank", was actually sponsored by technology companies.

== History of incidents ==
=== Origins ===
Although the term "astroturfing" was not yet developed, an early example of the practice was in Act 1, Scene 2 of Shakespeare's play Julius Caesar. In the play, Gaius Cassius Longinus writes fake letters from "the public" to convince Brutus to assassinate Julius Caesar.

The term "astroturfing" was first coined in 1985 by Texas Democratic Party senator Lloyd Bentsen when he said, "a fellow from Texas can tell the difference between grass roots and AstroTurf... this is generated mail." Bentsen was describing a "mountain of cards and letters" sent to his office to promote insurance industry interests.

=== Pharmaceuticals ===
Patient advocacy groups funded by biopharmaceutical companies are common. In 1997, Schering Plough paid a P/R firm Schandwick International, to create a national coalition of patient advocacy groups promoting Schering's Rebotron, a treatment for Hepatitis C. The groups pushed increased testing as a way to manufacture cases and lobbied state legislatures to cover the $18,000 treatment. The groups also hosted telephone "information lines" with scripts written by the drug company and distributed "patient information" pamphlets promoting drug therapies over other alternatives and overstating the danger of the medical condition. Manufacturers of AIDS drugs commonly fund LGBTQ organizations, which in turn, lobby to advance policies that increase AIDS drug sales. In 2019, the communications director of AIDS United, a Washington DC–based coalition of AIDS service organizations, resigned, stating such funding creates conflicts of interest among gay rights activists.

=== Tobacco ===
In response to the passage of tobacco control legislation in the US, Philip Morris, Burson-Marsteller and other tobacco interests created the National Smokers Alliance (NSA) in 1993. The NSA and other tobacco interests initiated an aggressive public relations campaign from 1994 to 1999 in an effort to exaggerate the appearance of grassroots support for smoker's rights. According to an article in the Journal of Health Communication, the NSA had mixed success at defeating bills that were damaging revenues of tobacco interests.

=== Internet ===
Email, automated phone calls, form letters, and the Internet made astroturfing more economical and prolific in the late 1990s. The internet in particular has made astroturfing cheaper, more widespread, and harder to detect.

In 2001, as Microsoft was defending itself against an antitrust lawsuit, Americans for Technology Leadership (ATL), a group heavily funded by Microsoft, initiated a letter-writing campaign. ATL contacted constituents under the guise of conducting a poll and sent pro-Microsoft consumers form and sample letters to send to involved lawmakers. The effort was designed to make it appear as though there was public support for a sympathetic ruling in the antitrust lawsuit.

In January 2018, YouTube user Isaac Protiva uploaded a video alleging that internet service provider Fidelity Communications was behind an initiative called "Stop City-Funded Internet", based on how some images on the Stop City-Funded Internet website had "Fidelity" in their file names. The campaign appeared to be in response to the city of West Plains expanding its broadband network, and advocated for the end of municipal broadband on the basis that it was too risky. Days later, Fidelity released a letter admitting to sponsoring the campaign.

=== Politics ===
In 2009–2010, an Indiana University research study developed a software system to detect astroturfing on Twitter due to the sensitivity of the topic in the run up to the 2010 U.S. midterm elections and account suspensions on the social media platform. The study cited a limited number of examples, all promoting conservative policies and candidates.

In 2003, GOPTeamLeader.com offered the site's users "points" that could be redeemed for products if they signed a form letter promoting George Bush and got a local paper to publish it as a letter to the editor. More than 100 newspapers published an identical letter to the editor from the site with different signatures on it. Similar campaigns were used by GeorgeWBush.com, and by MoveOn.org to promote Michael Moore's film Fahrenheit 9/11. The Committee for a Responsible Federal Budget's "Fix the Debt" campaign advocated to reduce government debt without disclosing that its members were lobbyists or high-ranking employees at corporations that aim to reduce federal spending. It also sent op-eds to various students that were published as-is.

Some organizations in the Tea Party movement have been accused of being astroturfed.

In October and November 2018, conservative marketing firm Rally Forge created what The New Yorker described as "a phony left-wing front group, America Progress Now, which promoted Green Party candidates online in 2018, apparently to hurt Democrats in several races by relying on the spoiler candidate strategy. Its ads on Facebook used socialist memes and slogans to attack Democrats and urge third-party protest voting in several tight races, including the 2018 Wisconsin gubernatorial election.

In 2018, a website called "Jexodus" claiming to be by "proud Jewish Millennials tired of living in bondage to leftist politics" was set up by Jeff Ballabon, a Republican operative in his mid-50s. The website was denounced as "likely a clumsy astroturf effort rather than an actual grassroots movement". The website was registered November 5, 2018, before the congressional election, and before those representatives accused of antisemitism had even been voted in. This website was later cited by Donald Trump as though it were an authentic movement.

As of 2025, Jexodus was rebranded as “The Exodus Movement” and is no longer active.

In January 2021, a team led by Mohsen Mosleh conducted a politically oriented astroturfing campaign on Twitter, using "a set of human-looking bot accounts"; each bot would search for users posting links the researchers considered to be fake news, and "tweet a public reply message to the user's tweet that contained the link to the false story". 1,586 spam replies were made over the course of fourteen days, until Twitter detected and suspended all of the bot accounts.

=== Environment and climate ===
Astroturfing organizations have been used by the fossil fuel industry in their fight against climate action or to propagate climate change denial. These organizations typically use euphemistic names to disguise their sponsors and agendas and often target "green" organizations with which they can be confused. Examples for such fossil fuel funded Astroturfing organizations are the National Wetlands Coalition, the Global Climate Coalition, the Greening Earth Society, the Washington Consumers for Sound Fuel Policy or the American Coalition for Clean Coal Energy.

Corporate efforts to mobilize the public against environmental regulation accelerated in the US following the election of president Barack Obama.

In 2014, the Toronto Sun, a conservative media organization, published an article accusing Russia of using astroturf tactics to drum up anti-fracking sentiment across Europe and the West, supposedly in order to maintain dominance in oil exports through Ukraine.

Fossil fuel company Glencore enlisted the C|T Group to conduct a coordinated pro-coal campaign called "Project Caesar" from 2017 onwards. Drawing on an annual budget of between £4-7 million, it created what appeared to be grassroots social media pages and groups to promote anti-renewable messages.

In Canada, a coalition of oil and gas company executives grouped under the Canadian Association of Petroleum Producers also initiated a series of Canadian actions to advocate for the oil and gas industry in Canada through mainstream and social media, and using online campaigning to generate public support for fossil fuel energy projects.

=== Commercial ===
In 2006, two Edelman employees created a blog called "Wal-Marting Across America" about two people traveling to Wal-Marts across the country. The blog gave the appearance of being operated by spontaneous consumers, but was actually operated on behalf of Working Families for Walmart, a group funded by Wal-Mart. In 2007, Ask.com deployed an anti-Google advertising campaign portraying Google as an "information monopoly" that was damaging the Internet. The ad was designed to give the appearance of a popular movement and did not disclose it was funded by a competitor.

In 2010, the Federal Trade Commission settled a complaint with Reverb Communications, who was using interns to post favorable product reviews in Apple's iTunes store for clients. In September 2012, one of the first major identified cases of astroturfing in Finland involved criticisms about the cost of a €1.8 billion patient information system, which was defended by fake online identities operated by involved vendors.

In September 2013, New York Attorney General Eric Schneiderman announced a settlement with 19 companies to prevent astroturfing. "'Astroturfing' is the 21st century's version of false advertising, and prosecutors have many tools at their disposal to put an end to it," said Scheiderman. The companies paid $350,000 to settle the matter, but the settlement opened the way for private suits as well. "Every state has some version of the statutes New York used," according to lawyer Kelly H. Kolb. "What the New York attorney general has done is, perhaps, to have given private lawyers a road map to file suit."

=== Mining ===
A report published in 2026 by Panamanian newspaper La Prensa argues entities with relationships to First Quantum Minerals, majority owner of the Cobre mine, Panama, have engaged in coordinated astroturfing-like campaigns in order to shift public opinion in favor of restarting mining activities, against popular public opinion. This involves fake personal social media profiles posting in favor of restarting mining activities, paying influencers and news outlets to align with the marketing campaign of the mining company as an apparent ideological stance without disclosure, and conventional disclosed advertising. When the company's local PR manager was confronted about it, she deflected the questions and defended their intent. It has also been used to attempt to shift public opinion by posing mining as an ideological stance and thus supporting mining activities by directly or indirectly making relationships between mining and societal issues, even over months, across posts sometimes mentioning only mining or societal issues in separate posts, and posing a single mine as mining and thus its restart as an ideological or political stance.

=== Parental rights movement ===
Moms for Liberty is an American political organization that is seen by some as an astroturfed movement, associated with the parental rights movement dedicated to "fighting for the survival of America by unifying, educating, and empowering parents to defend their parental rights at all levels of government". The Southern Poverty Law Center has categorized Moms For Liberty as an extremist “reactionary” and "conservative populist" organization. Founded on January 21, 2021, Moms For Liberty is a 501(c)(4) “social welfare” nonprofit. The group has ties to far-right conservative figures, politicians, and groups, most notably, Florida governor Ron DeSantis and The Proud Boys.

In 2023, DeSantis appointed Moms For Liberty founder Tina Descovich to the Florida State Commission on Ethics. Critics have derided the group's perceived meteoritic rise to fame as evidence of astroturfing. GLAAD notes that only one month after the group's formation, despite advertising themselves as a grassroots movement, garnered significant media attention from right wing circles. On January 27, 2021, the group was featured on the Rush Limbaugh show and was covered by far-right news publication Breitbart the following month. Bridget Ziegler, one of the group's three founders, is also married to Christian Ziegler, the chair of the Florida GOP.

The group participates in coordinated efforts to remove books from school curricula, otherwise known as book banning and the "flipping" of school boards through elections to push their agenda, often funded and supported by far-right organizations such as the Cato Institute, a libertarian, right-wing libertarian think tank funded by Republican mega-donor Charles Koch, while labeling themselves as a grassroots organization.

The National Organization for Marriage (NOM) is a nonprofit organization “with a mission to protect marriage”. It has long been criticized for tactics that resemble astroturfing, such as its ties to large-scale anonymous donors, as well as links to "Catholic groups" and the Church of Jesus Christ of Latter-day Saints (LDS Church), even facing allegations that its very formation was a front for the LDS Church despite its designation as a 501(c) status nonprofit. The group was formed in 2007 for the sole purpose of supporting California's Proposition 8, a state ballot measure to prohibit same-sex marriage, and continued to run similar campaigns in Massachusetts, Maine, and Oregon.

In 2010, the Human Rights Campaign (HRC) launched a website called "NOM Exposed" in which they detailed NOM's ties to "the Catholic Church hierarchy, to the Mormon Church, to evangelical right-wing pastors and churches and to those who have a long history of anti-gay rhetoric and activity", in which NOM raised nearly $10 million between its formation in 2007 and 2010, made up primarily of large anonymous private donations.

=== State-sponsored ===
An Al Jazeera TV series The Lobby documented Israel's attempt to promote more friendly, pro-Israel rhetoric to influence the attitudes of British youth, partly through influencing already established political bodies, such as the National Union of Students and the Labour Party, but also by creating new pro-Israel groups whose affiliation with the Israeli administration was kept secret.

In 2008, Chinese affairs expert Rebecca MacKinnon estimated the Chinese government employed 280,000 people in a government-sponsored astroturfing operation to post pro-government propaganda on social media and drown out voices of dissent.

In June 2010, the United States Air Force solicited for "persona management" software that would "enable an operator to exercise a number of different online persons from the same workstation and without fear of being discovered by sophisticated adversaries. Personas must be able to appear to originate in nearly any part of the world and can interact through conventional online services and social media platforms..." The $2.6 million contract was awarded to Ntrepid for astroturfing software the military would use to spread pro-American propaganda in the Middle East, and disrupt extremist propaganda and recruitment. The contract is thought to have been awarded as part of a program called Operation Earnest Voice, which was first developed as a psychological warfare weapon against the online presence of groups ranged against coalition forces.

In August 2020, the US-based public relations firm CLS Strategies was linked to a network of accounts removed by Facebook due to violations of their policies in regards to foreign interference. 55 Facebook accounts, 42 pages, and 36 Instagram accounts were removed. The information Facebook shared with investigators showed that the accounts focused on Venezuela, Bolivia, and Mexico, and included duplicate and fake accounts. Records showed connections with CLS Strategies employees, and that some of the work appeared to be at the behest of the Bolivian Government. Facebook had announced the closure of the accounts, stating that they targeted politics in the region and that $3.6 million was spent on advertising in the three countries on what they determined to be disinformation. CLS Strategies claimed the accusations made by Facebook were inaccurate.

On April 11, 2022, seven weeks into the 2022 Russian invasion of Ukraine, BBC published the results of investigation of a network of Facebook groups with the overall aim to promote the Russian president Vladimir Putin as a hero standing up to the West with overwhelming international support. Members, activities, and interrelations in 10 pro-Putin public groups with more than 650,000 members between them in the time of writing, boasting names such as Vladimir Putin - Leader of the Free World, were analyzed. Over a month, researchers counted 16,500 posts, receiving more than 3.6 million interactions. The campaign "creates the appearance of widespread support for Putin and the Kremlin in the shadow of the invasion and relies on... inauthentic accounts to accomplish its goal", according to a report. Lead researcher Moustafa Ayad described the network and its practice of using tens of duplicate accounts in potential violation of Facebook's rules on inauthentic behavior as an example of astroturfing.

== See also ==
- Crowds on Demand
- Front organization
- Greenwashing
- Government-organized non-governmental organization
- Internet activism
- Internet water army
- Pinkwashing
- Purplewashing
- Redwashing
- Shill
- Whitewashing
