= SEFL =

SEFL may refer to:

- Southeast Football League, American football league
- Tracy Sefl, American political consultant
