= Jessica Frech =

American singer

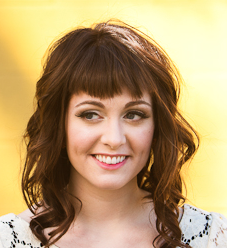

Background information
- Born: October 30, 1991 (age 35); Orlando, Florida
- Origin: Nashville, Tennessee
- Genre: Folk/Pop
- Occupation: Singer-songwriter
- Years active: 2009–present
- Label: unsigned

Jessica Frech is an American pop/folk singer-songwriter from Nashville, Tennessee. She gained worldwide notoriety with the release of the "People of Walmart" music video on YouTube. The comedy video features images from the People of Walmart photo blog along with an original score written by Frech. Shortly after release, the video went viral with multi-millions of views. The video has been featured on G4's Attack of the Show!, Fox News, Billboard, Jimmy Fallon, AOL, and MSNBC. In addition, it gained the attention of Hyundai which hired Jessica to create two commercials for their 2011 holiday campaign.

On August 20, 2009 Frech released her debut album Grapefruit. The album features six original songs recorded by Grammy-nominated Bart Pursley.

Frech released her first Christmas album Pull My Finger To Hear Jingle Bells on December 6, 2011. The album contains two traditional Christmas songs "Jingle Bells" and "We Wish You A Merry Christmas" along with two originals.

On December 18, 2011 Frech started a Kickstarter Campaign to fund her first full-length album "Reality". The original goal of $8,000 was met in less than 72 hrs. On February 5, 2012 the project was successfully funded by 718 backers pledging a total of $28,938.

Frech joined the second annual national DigiTour for two shows in Houston, Texas on March 15, 2012 and Dallas, Texas on March 16, 2012.

Frech's first full-length album Reality was released on March 20, 2012. The album has 12 songs. One track, "I Tried to Die Young", features Melanie Safka.

She attended Belmont University, majoring in songwriting.

== YouTube ==
Frech's YouTube channel has over 12 million views.

=== Videos ===
Title	Details	Release Date
Reality	Music Video	April 2, 2012
Our Family Christmas	Music Video	December 6, 2011
Black Friday Night	Parody of the song Last Friday Night (T.G.I.F.) by Katy Perry	November 23, 2011
People of Walmart 2	Music Video	November 17, 2011
Dance	Music Video	November 14, 2011
Kesha Done With Cookware	Cover of the song Blow by Kesha	August 21, 2011
Facebook Creeping	Music Video, Song Challenge	August 14, 2011
Airport Security	Music Video, Song Challenge	July 24, 2011
Awkwardness in an Elevator	Music Video, Song Challenge	July 11, 2011
I'm A Wizard	Parody of the Harry Potter movie series	July 7, 2011
Pee in Traffic	Music Video, Song Challenge	June 27, 2011
McWeiner	Music Video, Song Challenge	June 19, 2011
Time After Time (cover)	Cover of the song Time After Time by Cyndi Lauper	June 9, 2011
Can't Get Better Than This	Music Video	June 2, 2011
Brand New Key (cover)	Cover of the song Brand New Key by Melanie Safka	May 22, 2011
People of Walmart	Music Video	May 5, 2011
It's Me	Music Video	April 12, 2011
Fountain Lady Song	Music Video	January 24, 2011
Poker Face (cover)	Cover of the song Poker Face by Lady Gaga	March 27, 2010

== Awards and achievements ==
Break.com named music video "People of Walmart" as the No. 1 viral video of 2011

Named Hot-Up-N-Comer of 2010 by Woman's Radio

The Independent Singer Songwriters Association 2009 Honorable Mention for the song "Grapefruit"

Placed 5th on OurStage.com for 2009 Folk Song of The Year for the song "Reality"

== Discography ==
=== Albums ===
Title	Details
Grapefruit EP	Release date: August 14, 2009
Pull My Finger To Hear Jingle Bells	Release date: August 5, 2011
Reality	Release date: March 20, 2012

=== Singles / Tracks ===
Year	Single	Album
2009	"Jewelry"	Grapefruit EP
2009	"Reality"	Grapefruit EP
2009	"Grapefruit"	Grapefruit EP
2009	"The Lullaby"	Grapefruit EP
2009	"Growing Older"	Grapefruit EP
2009	"This Little Flaw In Me"	Grapefruit EP
2011	"People of Walmart "	People of Walmart – Single
2011	"I'm a Wizard "	I'm a Wizard- Single
2011	"People of Walmart 2"	People of Walmart 2 – Single
2011	"Annie "	Annie – Single
2011	" I Fell In The Fountain"	I Fell in the Fountain – Single
2011	"Can't Get Better Than This"	Can't Get Better Than This – Single
2011	"Dance"	Dance – Single
2011	"Our Family Christmas"	Pull My Finger To Hear Jingle Bells
2011	"Jingle Bells"	Pull My Finger To Hear Jingle Bells
2011	"This Christmas"	Pull My Finger To Hear Jingle Bells
2011	"We Wish You A Merry Christmas"	Pull My Finger To Hear Jingle Bells
2012	"Reality"	Reality
2012	"Fame"	Reality
2012	"It's Me"	Reality
2012	"Hoping Against Hope "	Reality
2012	"Grand Marquis"	Reality
2012	"I Tried To Die Young (feat Melanie Safka)"	Reality
2012	"Growing Older"	Reality
2012	"Jewelry"	Reality
2012	"Happiness"	Reality
2012	"Brand New Key"	Reality
2012	"Can't Get Better Than This"	Reality
2012	"Just The Two Of Us "	Reality
2014	"Speak Softer, Love Louder"	Speak Softer, Love Louder
