= Walmart Inc. v. DEA-DOJ =

Opioid-related lawsuit between Walmart and the DEA/DOJ

Walmart Inc. v. DEA-DOJ was a settlement involving the complaints and lawsuits of Walmart pharmacy, and other large pharmaceutical companies. The lawsuits were made after an official complaint issued by the United States Department of Justice and the Drug Enforcement Administration, after Walmart was accused of illicitly selling opioids to their customers.

== Complaint ==
On December 22, 2020, the United States Department of Justice filed an official complaint directed towards the Walmart pharmacy for continuing to sell codeine and other opioids to customers, despite passed laws prohibiting the act.

== Lawsuit ==
Under the presiding of William Barr, Walmart and the United States Department of Justice and the Drug Enforcement Administration went to court in attempt to resolve the issue. Other pharmacies were also pulled into this legal case for similarly defying the Controlled Substances Act and contributing to the Opioid epidemic in the United States. Many large pharmaceutical companies, such as Walgreens, Sam's Club and CVS Pharmacy were included in this case.

Within the lawsuit, the Department of Justice argued that Walmart pressured pharmacists to refill as many prescriptions as fast as possible. They also argued that the all pharmacies in the United States have to comply with federal law before refilling a prescription. Walmart counter-argued that every individual pharmacist must make the decision to refill a prescription or not.

After five and a half days of deliberation, the jury sided with the Department of Justice. All companies involved were forced to pay a total of 10 billion dollars in restitution and damages, and were banned from dispensing opioids to consumers. Walgreens and CVS agreed to pay 6 billion dollars between the two companies over a five-year period.

== See also ==
- Criticism of Walmart
- Federal drug policy of the United States
