= Walmart Watch =

American nonprofit organization

Walmart Watch, formed in the spring of 2005, was a joint project of the Center for Community and Corporate Ethics, a nonprofit organization studying the impact of large corporations on society, and its advocacy arm, Five Stones. The Walmart Watch group was based in Washington with the claimed goal to challenge Walmart to become a better employer, neighbor, and corporate citizen in order to improve the wages, health benefits, and treatment of workers.

One of Walmart Watch's initial attacks against Walmart was setting up an automated phone system that called 10,000 people in Arkansas in efforts to find individuals who would share secrets about the practices of Walmart on their workers. As a result of this automated phone system attack, Walmart Watch created a 24-page report revealing the company's wages and benefits. Walmart Watch's goal was to get the inside scoop on Walmart's practices, in hope that they would be less than respectable, to show the public the "ugly truth" behind Walmart.

== Backers and funding ==
Walmart Watch was originally funded by the Service Employees International Union (SEIU), and was later part of United Food and Commercial Workers International Union. According to the Wall Street Journal, Walmart Watch was mainly funded by Five Stones, a 501(c)(3) organization that received $2,775,000 in 2005 from the SEIU. The SEIU reportedly gave Five Stones $1 million in 2004 to start Walmart Watch.

== Reasons for opposition ==
Walmart Watch obtained a copy of a Walmart draft memo which suggested ways to cut employee benefit costs. Walmart Watch asserted that the memo portrayed workers' wages and benefits as being too low. The memo proposed ways to reduce spending on workers' benefits without damaging the reputation of Walmart. Specifically, one proposal suggested that Walmart begin hiring more part-time workers because they would not be bound to offer the same benefits as they do for full-time workers. This would also help Walmart cut costs by being able to pay workers a part-time wage rather than a full-time wage. Therefore, Walmart Watch took action by exposing this internal draft memo to the public to illustrate the worsening conditions of Walmart employees.

== Projects ==
During the period of November 13–19, 2005, Walmart Watch sponsored "Higher Expectations Week" to highlight its campaign to reform Walmart. It reported over 300 supporting organizations. "Higher Expectations Week" was a nationwide campaign that held thousands of events during the week. Some events consisted of town hall meetings with elected officials present as well as religious leaders giving sermons. Walmart Watch wanted to address the public through events that respectable public figures supported. The biggest event of the week was the screenings of the film Wal-Mart: The High Cost of Low Price, produced by Robert Greenwald. There were 3,500 planned screenings of the film nationwide. Labor unions such as Service Employees International Union, International Brotherhood of Teamsters, and United Food and Commercial Workers participated in "Higher Expectations Week". Liberal groups such as Sierra Club, United for a Fair Economy, and Pride at Work also participated in the weeklong campaign. Local affiliates of AFL–CIO, National Organization for Women, ACLU, and NARAL Pro-Choice America were also supporters of the events.

== Effects on Walmart ==
Walmart Watch's actions, geared toward influencing Walmart to alter its business practices, negatively affected Walmart financially as well as their reputation among consumers. By November 2006, Walmart's stock suffered from the negative publicity and was down 30 percent since 2000. In addition, Walmart's sales growth was 3.1 percent lower than their competitor, Target, at 1.5 percent. The financial losses continued into 2007, when Walmart shares were priced at $43.16, an 81-cent drop.

Two separate polls reported a decrease in Walmart's popularity among consumers after the negative publicity brought about by Walmart Watch. McKinsey & Co. reported that 2–8 percent of consumers no longer wanted to shop at Walmart. Westhill Consulting took a poll over a two-year period of Walmart's overall favorability. The results showed that Walmart's favorability decreased by 8 percent along with consumers developing a negative opinion of Walmart. The negative publicity resulted in 11 percent of consumers changing their shopping habits and 9 percent purchasing less.

The release of and mass viewings of the documentary Wal-Mart: The High Cost of Low Price during "Higher Expectations Week" brought the issue of gender discrimination, directed toward female employees, to the forefront in 2007, leading to Walmart facing a class action lawsuit. In February 2007, the United States Court of Appeals for the Ninth Circuit decided, in a 2-to-1 ruling, that the lawsuit would proceed as a class action on account of the 1.5 million female employees, who claimed they were denied higher pay and company promotions. The lawsuit eventually developed into a United States Supreme Court case, Wal-Mart v. Dukes.

== Walmart's response ==
In an attempt to reconcile its image, Walmart banded with Edelman Public Relations to create an opposing advocacy group, Working Families for Wal-Mart, on December 20, 2005. The goal of this advocacy group was to show Walmart in a positive light to society by highlighting Walmart's charitable contributions and corporate social responsibility initiatives. However, the group was criticized for not being an actual grassroots organization due to its funding by Walmart.

== Merge ==
In 2009 Walmart Watch decided to merge with a fellow union-backed anti-Walmart group, Wake Up Wal-Mart, and the two groups were consolidated under the name WakeUpWalMart.com. Both of these groups had the same goals of pressuring Walmart to raise worker wages and improve worker benefits. Meghan Scott, spokeswoman for the United Food and Commercial Workers Union, stated that it would be optimal to merge the two groups in order to improve their efforts against the world's largest retailer.

That organization is also now defunct. Its website is no longer active and the url wakeupwalmart.com now redirects to another UFCW-funded group, Making Change At Walmart.

== Walmart Watch members ==
- Andrew Grossman

Grossman was the founder of Walmart Watch and served as the executive director with the goal to challenge the world's largest business to be a better corporate citizen. Since Grossman and Walmart Watch challenged Walmart, Walmart has launched an environment initiative and endorsed the Affordable Care Act. In 2007, Grossman left his full-time position with Walmart Watch and took on a consulting role. David Nassar, former chief of staff, was chosen to fill the position of executive director.

- David Nassar

Nassar initially served as chief of staff for Walmart Watch, then in 2007 Andy Stern, board chairman, chose Nassar as the best candidate to fill the position of executive director. Prior to being appointed as executive director of Walmart Watch, Nassar worked as a field organizer and manager on domestic and international campaigns, managed pro-democracy programs for the National Democratic Institute for International Affairs in Yemen, Lebanon, and Jordan, and managed SEIU's New Hampshire for Health Care campaign.

- Andy Stern

Stern served as the chairman of the Walmart Watch Board, in addition to being the president of the Service Employees International Union (SEIU), a union that funded Walmart Watch.

- Tracy Sefl

Tracy Sefl served as the communication director for Walmart Watch. She acted as the spokeswoman for Walmart Watch by responding to newspapers and reporters in regards to the actions of Walmart.

== See also ==
- Walmart
- Criticism of Walmart
- Wake Up Wal-Mart
- Working Families for Walmart
- Business ethics
