= Americans for Technology Leadership =

Americans for Technology Leadership is a coalition of technology professionals, companies and organizations that advocates limited government regulation of technology. It has been described as a Microsoft front organization and has been cited as an example of astroturfing.

In 2001, the Los Angeles Times reported that hundreds of similar letters were sent to newspapers voicing disagreement with the United States Department of Justice and its antitrust suit against Microsoft. The letters, prepared by Americans for Technology Leadership and Citizens Against Government Waste, had in some cases been mailed from deceased citizens or nonexistent addresses.

The founding members of the coalition are:

- Citizens Against Government Waste
- Cityscape Filmworks
- Clarity Consulting
- CompTIA
- CompUSA
- Microsoft Corporation
- 60Plus Association
- Small Business Survival Committee
- Staples, Inc.
