= Wake Up Wal-Mart =

Defunct labor activist campaign

Wake Up Wal-Mart was a campaign founded by United Food and Commercial Workers Union. It was based in Washington, D.C., and was often critical of the business practices of Walmart, the world's largest retailer, and the largest private employer in the United States. The group claimed Walmart was offering its employees substandard wages and health care benefits, and called on the retailer to improve both. Wake Up Wal-Mart was founded April 5, 2005, and maintained the web site WakeupWalMart.com, the centerpiece of the organization. The organization is now defunct. Its website is no longer active and the url wakeupwalmart.com now redirects to another UFCW-funded group, Making Change At Walmart.

== Purpose ==
The group argued that Wal-Mart paid "poverty wages", relied on public health care rather than providing its employees with healthcare, and was, in general, harmful to communities.

== Wal-Mart Workers of America ==
In 2005, the group formed an organization called "Wal-Mart Workers of America". The group said that the purpose of the new organization was to assist past and present Wal-Mart employees, but that it was not a formal labor union.

== See also ==
- Buffy Wicks
- Criticism of Walmart
- Walmart Watch
- Whirl-Mart
- Working Families for Wal-Mart
