= Working Families for Walmart =

American advocacy group

Working Families for Walmart is an advocacy group formed by Walmart and the Edelman public relations firm on December 20, 2005. It has been used to praise Walmart in a show of opposition to union-funded groups such as Wake Up Wal-Mart and Wal-Mart Watch. The group is financially supported by Walmart and is headquartered in Edelman's Washington, D.C. office. It is not organized as a non-profit, and is not required to disclose its sources of funding.

Critics have accused Walmart of leaving the impression that Working Families for Walmart is a spontaneous grass-roots organization, without fully disclosing its financial reliance upon Walmart. The group's web site does not reveal its connection to Walmart or Edelman. Its home page features a blog with a link stating that the bloggers are employees of Edelman; however, no other mention is made of Edelman on the site. This has led to accusations of Walmart being engaged in deceit and astroturfing. For example, Wal-Mart Watch has stated, "Working Families for Wal-Mart is not a lobbying group or a 501(c)3 (non-profit), but is a sock puppet for Edelman, Walmart's public relations firm."

== Leadership ==
=== Initial leadership ===
The group's initial leader was Bishop Ira Combs Jr. of the Greater Bible Way Temple of the Apostolic Faith in Jackson, Michigan. According to Lynda Edward's December 22, 2005 story in the Arkansas Democrat-Gazette, Combs said, "Some friends I worked with on the 2004 Bush campaign phoned me and asked me if I knew about any good things Wal-Mart was doing in my community. ...I said Wal-Mart is supplying jobs that may not pay a union wage but they pay twice the minimum wage. They asked me if I would be part of this group. Wal-Mart isn’t paying me."

Another of the group's early members, Courtney Lynch, taught seminars at Walmart headquarters on cultivating female leaders. She stated that she received no salary as an advocate but estimated that her consulting firm got 7 percent of its revenue from Walmart in 2005.

=== Andrew Young chairmanship ===
On February 27, 2006, former ambassador to the United Nations Andrew Young assumed duties as "the public spokesman for a group organized with backing from Wal-Mart Stores Inc. that defends the world's largest retailer against mounting attacks from its critics," according to Associated Press business writer Marcus Kabel's article. In a telephone interview, he told Kabel that he is not being paid but that the organization that he currently heads, GoodWorks International, has a contract from Working Families for Wal-Mart for consulting work. GoodWorks pairs corporations and governments on global issues. Working Families for Wal-Mart declined to disclose how much Walmart contributes or what it is paying GoodWorks.

Young, a former labor organizer, parts ways with unions regarding Walmart. "The union position is talking about the redistribution of wealth, but they're not talking about generating new wealth. Wal-Mart is generating new wealth when it comes in. The pluses outweigh the minuses. They do give benefits, they do have health insurance."

== Reaction by groups critical of Walmart ==
=== Wake Up Wal-Mart ===
According to Edward's story, the previous week, the union group Wake Up Wal-Mart announced a campaign by 13 religious leaders from Texas, Georgia, Tennessee, Kentucky, Colorado and Oklahoma to persuade Wal-Mart to adopt labor reforms. Its spokesman, Chris Kofinis, expressed frustration by what he sees as a media chess game.

"It should be easy for Wal-Mart to reach out to genuine Republicans, patriotic Democrats and independents who can sit down together to find ways Wal-Mart can treat its workers and communities better. ... Instead, it hires right-wing attack dogs."

In reaction to Young's role with the organization, Paul Blank, campaign director for Wake Up Wal-Mart issued a statement on February 27, 2006. “We call on Ambassador Andrew Young to use his new position to help us change Wal-Mart for the better, rather than defend its abysmal record of child labor violations and poor health care. As a consultant to Wal-Mart, Ambassador Young is now in a unique position to reach out to Wal-Mart and CEO Lee Scott and urge them to change. We hope he will work with WakeUpWalMart.com and help our efforts to create a better Wal-Mart and build a better America."

=== Wal-Mart Watch ===
On December 20, 2005 in response to the announcement of the organization, Wal-Mart Watch issued a statement inviting "this new group ... to review the latest data on the company.

"Some facts on Wal-Mart and working families:

- The average annual pay for a cashier is $14,000 a year, $1,000 below the federal poverty line for a family of three.
- Wal-Mart fails to provide health insurance to over half of its 1.3 million U.S. employees.
- By its own admission, 46% of the children of Wal-Mart employees are uninsured or covered by Medicaid."

=== AFL–CIO ===
On January 5, 2006, AFL–CIO President John Sweeney, saying the union had been unable to garner Republican congressional support for a national solution, announced a "Fair Share Health Care Campaign" in 33 states. The campaign would work to pass state laws requiring large corporations to spend a certain percentage of their payrolls to provide health care benefits for employees or pay into a state Fair Share Health Care Fund. The percent of payroll would be set by the state legislature or based on the average percentage paid by large employers in the state.

Sweeney cited the example of an Alliance, Ohio Walmart employee who went on Medicaid when her wages would not cover the cost of the corporation's health insurance. “Why should a company like Walmart – which made $10 billion last year alone – be able to force taxpayers to foot the bill for their health care costs?” Sweeney asked.

== See also ==
- Wake Up Wal-Mart
- Criticism of Walmart
- Wal-Mart Watch
