= International Consumer Protection and Enforcement Network =

The International Consumer Protection and Enforcement Network (ICPEN), formerly the International Marketing Supervision Network (IMSN), is a global network of consumer protection authorities which engages in dispute resolution and encourages cooperation between law enforcement agencies for disputes arising from commerce across international borders. Many members are also members of the Organisation for Economic Co-operation and Development (OECD).

== History ==
Delegates from Australia, Austria, Belgium, Canada, Denmark, France, Finland, Germany, the Netherlands, Hungary, Ireland, Japan, New Zealand, Norway, Portugal, Spain, Sweden, Switzerland, the United Kingdom, and the United States established the Network in 1992, with participation from representatives of the OECD and the EU. Greece, Italy, and Luxembourg joined the network later that year.

The ICPEN partners includes organizations from Angola, Suriname, Peru (2013), Kenya and Kosovo (2014).

== Participating nations ==
The following nations are represented in the network:

Country	Date of entry	Type
Angola	2015	member
Australia	1992	member
Austria	1992	member
Azerbaijan	2006	member
Barbados	2011	member
Belgium	1992	member
Bulgaria	2012	member
Canada	1992	member
Chile	2005	member
China	2006	member
Colombia	2013	member
Costa Rica	2010	member
Cyprus	2005	member
Czech Republic	1996	member
Denmark	1992	member
Dominican Republic	2014	member
Egypt	2010	member
El Salvador	2010	member
Estonia	2002	member
Eswatini	2019	partner
European Commission	1992	observer
Finland	1992	member
France	1992	member
Germany	1992	member
Greece	1993	member
Hungary	1992	member
Ireland	1992	member
Israel	2013	member
Italy	1992	member
Japan	1992	member
Kenya	2016	member
Korea	1996	member
Kosovo	2016	member
Latvia	2002	member
Lithuania	2003	member
Luxembourg	1993	member
Malawi	2017	partner
Malta	1996	member
Mexico	1994	member
Mongolia	2012	member
Morocco	2019	partner
Netherlands	1992	member
New Zealand	1992	member
Nigeria	2013	member
Norway	1992	member
OECD		observer
Panama	2011	member
Papua New Guinea	2012	member
Peru	2015	member
Philippines	2014	member
Poland	1996	member
Portugal	1992	member
Qatar	2017	partner
Saudi Arabia	2016	member
Seychelles	2014	member
Slovakia	1996	member
South Africa	2019	partner
Spain	1992	member
Sri Lanka	2017	member
Suriname	2015	member
Sweden	1992	member
Switzerland	1992	member
Turkey	2010	member
United Arab Emirates	2016	member
UNCTAD		observer
United Kingdom	1992	member
United States	1992	member
Vietnam	2013	member
Zambia	2014	member
