= Tracy Sefl =

American political consultant

Tracy Sefl is a communications specialist with expertise in media and issue advocacy. In 2012, she and her colleagues were awarded “Public Affairs Campaign of the Year” from the American Association of Political Consultants . The New York Times has noted her ability to create media “without fingerprints.”

== Education ==
Tracy Sefl received a Bachelor of Arts in sociology and music at Cornell College followed by a Masters of Arts and Ph.D. in sociology at the University of Illinois at Chicago.

== Career ==
Before launching an independent consulting practice, Sefl was Senior Vice President and Principal for consulting firm Navigators Global and Vice President at The Glover Park Group in Washington, DC.

Sefl launched and directed communications efforts for the national advocacy group Wal-Mart Watch.

Sefl also works as a political pundit in print and on television and has been a featured speaker at Harvard Institute of Politics. She currently serves on the Board of Directors of RAINN, which operates the national sexual assault hotline, and is a co-founder of the Advisory Council for Child Trafficking.

Sefl advised the Hillary Clinton presidential campaign on national media strategy and tactics. During the 2004 presidential campaign, Sefl served as an advisor to Chairman Terry McAuliffe of the Democratic National Committee.

Sefl was a senior advisor to the Ready for Hillary SuperPAC until it disbanded in April 2015 with Clinton's announcing her candidacy for president.

== Personal life ==
Tracy Sefl and husband Darius Tandon, associate professor at the Northwestern University Feinberg School of Medicine, split time between Chicago and Washington, DC.
