= The Wal-Mart Effect =

2006 book

- Author: Charles Fishman
- Language: English
- Subject: Economics; Labor economics; Management; Advertising and public relations
- Genre: Non-fiction
- Publisher: Penguin Press
- Publication date: 2006
- Publication place: United States
- Media type: Print (hardcover & paperback)
- Pages: 294 (first edition)
- ISBN: 978-1-594-20076-2
- OCLC: 62282449

The Wal-Mart Effect is a 2006 book by business journalist Charles Fishman, a senior editor at Fast Company magazine, which describes local and global economic effects attributable to the retail chain Walmart.

In the book, Fishman writes that Walmart is arguably the world's most important privately controlled economic institution, and that the phrase "the Wal-Mart effect" is shorthand for a wide range of both positive and negative impacts on consumers resulting from how Walmart does its business. He describes these effects as including the suburbanization of the local shopping experience, the driving down of local prices for all everyday necessities, the draining of the viability of the traditional local shopping areas, a continual downward pressure on local wages, the consolidation of consumer product companies aiming to match Walmart's scale, a continual downward pressure on inflation, and a new and continual cost scrutiny at a wide range of businesses enabling them to survive on thinner profit margins. Fishman concludes that Walmart is "beyond the market forces that capitalism relies on to enforce fair play [and] isn't subject to the market forces because it's creating them."

Fishman did not coin the phrase Wal-Mart effect. It has been traced back to 1990, when journalist Julie Morris used it in a USA Today story.

Following the publication of The Wal-Mart Effect, Walmart commissioned its own study of the phenomenon from Global Insight, a research and consulting company. The Wal-Mart Effect was among several books documenting and analyzing the economic effects of Walmart on local economies: others have included The Local Economic Impact of Walmart by economist Michael J. Hicks, and Walmart: The Face Of Twenty-First-Century Capitalism by American labor historian Nelson Lichtenstein.

Since the release of The Wal-Mart Effect, journalists, economists and others have documented additional Walmart effects. In 2013, the Democratic staff of the U.S. House Committee on Education and the Workforce released a report called Wal-Mart's The Low‐Wage Drag on Our Economy: Wal‐Mart's low wages and their effect on taxpayers and economic growth, which analyzed Walmart's effect on U.S. government finances and concluded that each Wal-Mart store with at least 300 employees costs taxpayers between $900,000 and $1.75 million per year for social services for its workers, such as healthcare, Section 8 housing programs, subsidized school lunches and earned income tax credits.
