= Journal of Consumer Policy =

- Discipline: Economics, marketing
- Language: English
- Edited by: A. Mathios, L.A. Reisch, J. Thøgersen, H. Micklitz, C. Twigg-Flesner

Publication details
- Former name: Zeitschrift für Verbraucherpolitik
- History: 1977-present
- Publisher: Springer Science+Business Media
- Frequency: Quarterly
- Open access: Hybrid

Standard abbreviations
- ISO 4: J. Consum. Policy

Indexing
- ISSN: 0168-7034 (print); 1573-0700 (web)
- LCCN: 83646671
- OCLC no.: 971898949

Links
- Journal homepage; Online archive

The Journal of Consumer Policy is a quarterly peer-reviewed academic journal covering legal and regulatory issues related to consumer behaviour. It was established in 1977 as the Zeitschrift für Verbraucherpolitik and is published by Springer Science+Business Media. The editors-in-chief are Alan Mathios (Cornell University), Vanessa Mak (Leiden University), J. Michael Collins (University of Wisconsin--Madison), John Thøgersen (Aarhus School of Business, and Christian Twigg-Flesner (University of Warwick). The journal is abstracted and indexed in Scopus, Inspec, EconLit, ProQuest databases, AGRICOLA, EBSCO databases, International Bibliography of the Social Sciences, and Research Papers in Economics.
