= Southeast Football League =

- Current season, competition or edition: 2013 SEFL Season
- Sport: American football
- Founded: 1995
- First season: 1995
- CEO: Jesse L. Wiggins
- Motto: "A Fan-Tastic Experience"
- No. of teams: 12
- Country: United States
- Most recent champion: Knights of Miami
- Most titles: Knights of Miami (5)

The Southeast Football League (SEFL) was an adult amateur American football league, comprising 12 teams from various southeastern United States. The SEFL is headquartered in Miami, Florida, and began the 2013 season with twelve member teams from around the state of Florida.

The regular season is an eleven-week schedule during which each team has one bye week and plays ten games. Each team will play all other teams in their division once, and likewise for all other teams outside the division within the conference and/or league. The season starts in early February and runs weekly to late May.

The SEFL was founded in 1995 by Dr. Franklin F. Sands and Jesse L. Wiggins. The league operated through the 1997 season, then folded. It was resurrected by Wiggins in June 2002 and began playing again in the spring of 2003. The SEFL has been operational each year since.

The Miami Knights and the Central Florida Thoroughbreds have each participated in a record five SEFL Championship Title Games. The Knights have won more SEFL Championship titles than any other league franchise - five. The Thoroughbreds organization, winners of two SEFL Championship Titles, holds the league record for consecutive SEFL Championship Game appearances with five (2005–2009).

== Member teams ==
Member teams varied from season to season. In 2010, 20 teams started the season. The league had two divisions (North and South) as of January 1, 2014. Below is a list of the 2014 teams:

=== North Division ===
- Broward Outlaws (Broward County)
- Florida Kings (Homestead)
- South Florida 49'ers (Lauderhill)
- Miami Hustler Made (Miami)

=== Southeast Division ===
- Miami Fins (Miami)
- South Florida Dolphins (Miami)
- Miami Gators (Miramar)
- Knights of Miami (Miami)
- South Florida Patriots (Broward)
- Bone Island Pirates (Key West)

== Championship Game results ==
- 2013 - South Florida 49'ers 25 Knights Of Miami 0
- 2012 - Knights of Miami 12, South Florida 49'ers 7
- 2011 - South Florida Storm 21, Broward County Cowboys 19
- 2010 - South Florida Broncos 34, Brevard Warriors 27
- 2009 - Brevard Warriors 45, Central Florida Thoroughbreds 10
- 2008 - Knights of Miami 27, Central Florida Thoroughbreds 17
- 2007 - Central Florida Thoroughbreds 30, Miami Knights 28
- 2006 - Ocala Thoroughbreds 24, Knights of Miami21 (OT)
- 2005 - Orange County Falcons 29, Ocala Thoroughbreds 12
- 2004 - Knights of Miami 39, Florida Kings 36
- 2003 - Knights of Miami 32, Tampa Bay Bulldogs 19
- 1998-2002 League was not in operation
- 1997 - Knights of Miami (declared champions; no championship game)
- 1996 - Gainesville Growlers (no championship game information available)
