= People of Walmart =

American entertainment website

- Website type: Entertainment
- Available in: English
- Owners: Adam Kipple; Andrew Kipple; Luke Wherry
- Website: peopleofwalmart.com
- Commercial: Yes
- Launched: August 2009
- Current status: Defunct since September 20, 2022; 4 years ago

People of Walmart (PoW) was an entertainment website featuring user-submitted photos of Walmart customers considered to be socially awkward or undesirable by users of the site. PoW was promoted largely on sites like Digg and Funny or Die and linked on Facebook and Twitter. People of Walmart was founded in 2009 by brothers Andrew and Adam Kipple and their friend Luke Wherry.

== History ==
The website was founded in August 2009 after three men in their 20s—Andrew Kipple, his brother Adam, and their friend Luke Wherry—noticed at a South Carolina Walmart a woman who, to them, looked like a stripper and wore a T-shirt that read "go f*** yourself" with a two-year-old in a harness and a man with a beard reminiscent of those worn by ZZ Top. They created the website to share what they found truly remarkable, ignoring more stereotypical "rednecks" or mullets. While they created the site for their own social circle, it immediately went viral, enabling Wherry and Adam Kipple to leave their prior jobs. Andrew Kipple was a student.

In addition to avoiding the ordinary, the trio refused to post photos of people who are disabled, working Walmart employees, or the Amish.

The site gave rise to various other similar websites, some with variations on the theme.

After 13 years, the site was taken down in September 2022.

== Site features ==
The People of Walmart site was divided into tabs, including photos (broken up into newest, top rated, by state, and random), stories (love letters and hate mail), videos, and a submit section. Users had the ability to rate the photos that are posted. There was also a store selling logoed merchandise. The site was a member of the Three Ring Blogs network of blogs where people could post anonymous content, most of which had a humorous focus; others included "That's my boss," "dumbtweets," "Girls in yoga pants," and "How I was dumped."

== Backlash ==
Walmart spokesman David Tovar declined to comment, saying in an e-mail that it "doesn't seem like it's news that there's a website that allows people to post photos on it".

A woman named Melanie Wheeler was upset upon finding her mother's embarrassing image on the site accompanied by the caption, "A member of the Canadian division of the Trench Coat Mafia." The pair contacted the press to express their disgust in the website and how they had felt violated. However, the People of Walmart FAQ stated that if a user finds that they are unwillingly shown in a picture, "Simply email us and we will take it down, no problem. If you like your photo but hate the caption or comment send us an email and we can remove it."

== Social media ==
People of Walmart had a Facebook and Twitter account; and in 2017 announced the launch of apps for Android and iOS allowing pictures to be posted from a mobile device.
