= Whirl-Mart =

Culture jamming tactic

Whirl-Mart is a culture jamming tactic aimed at retail establishments, typically superstores.

Whirl-Mart consists of a group of "Whirl-Marters" who congregate at a large superstore (usually a Walmart, Asda, or Sainsbury's) and slowly push empty shopping carts silently through store aisles. Participants will not purchase anything and seek to form a lengthy chain of non-shoppers, continually weaving and "whirling" through a maze of store aisles for up to an hour at a time. Participants describe their actions as "a collective reclamation of space that is otherwise only used for buying and selling". Whirl-Marters seek to mimic and mock what they perceive as the absurdity of the shopping process.

== Origins ==
The activity was founded by the group "Breathing Planet Troupe" at a Walmart store in Troy, New York on April 1, 2001. The group was seeking to respond to an article from Adbusters magazine that called for foolish activities in conjunction with April Fool's Day. Since then, Whirl-Mart activities have spread to many other countries, such as Canada and the United Kingdom.

== Tactics ==
In addition to the act's satirical and comedic value, Whirl-Mart provides a legal, non-confrontational outlet for would-be protesters to address consumerism and materialism. Whirl-Marters do not aim to block store aisles or interfere with legitimate shoppers, and typically will not speak unless addressed. Their aim is to basically create a silent, non-violent protest or mockery of consumerism. Participants are typically non-confrontational, seeking to make themselves silent examples rather than active propagandists.

One variation of the Whirl-Mart protest involves filling carts but either simply abandoning them or, while checking out, either returning everything or claiming to have forgotten the money to purchase the items in the cart, leaving the full cart for the employees to clean up. However, this is usually not preferred, as this tends to affect regular employees, not the store's management. This also implies the Whirl-Marter was a regular shopper who would have purchased those items anyway, decreasing the effectiveness of the tactic.

Whirl-Marters are often very loosely organized, describing themselves as open to anyone wishing to participate.

== Confrontations ==
Whirl-Marters, when confronted by security or store management, typically do not admit to being protestors, generally replying in a tongue-in-cheek manner that may subtly attack consumerism or the store itself. Alternatively, they may pretend they are regular shoppers who are "still looking for something to buy" after spending up to an hour wandering aimlessly through a superstore.

Whirl-Marters claim they can talk their way out of being removed from the store (though the involvement of law enforcement officials in removing Whirl-Marters is not unheard of). When confronted, Whirl-Mart participants may sometimes scatter to various store aisles, forcing management or security to confront them individually. Participants will very rarely admit to or even address commercialism, materialism, or any other reason they are actually there. Whirl-Marters often wear an identifying outfit, typically consisting of plain, featureless clothing or clothing with ideological slogans or symbols. Some Whirl-Marters may wear hoodies and face masks to hide their identities, though this tends to attract the attention of employees.

Some Whirl-Marters have attempted to document their activities with video cameras or phones. Stores typically do not permit recordings (aside from their own security cameras), so recordings of these instances are often seized by store authorities, if they are even recorded at all.

== See also ==
- Anti-consumerism
- Over-consumption
- Anti-establishment
