= Forbes list of the World's Most Powerful People =

Ranking by Forbes magazine, 2009–2018

Logo of Forbes magazine

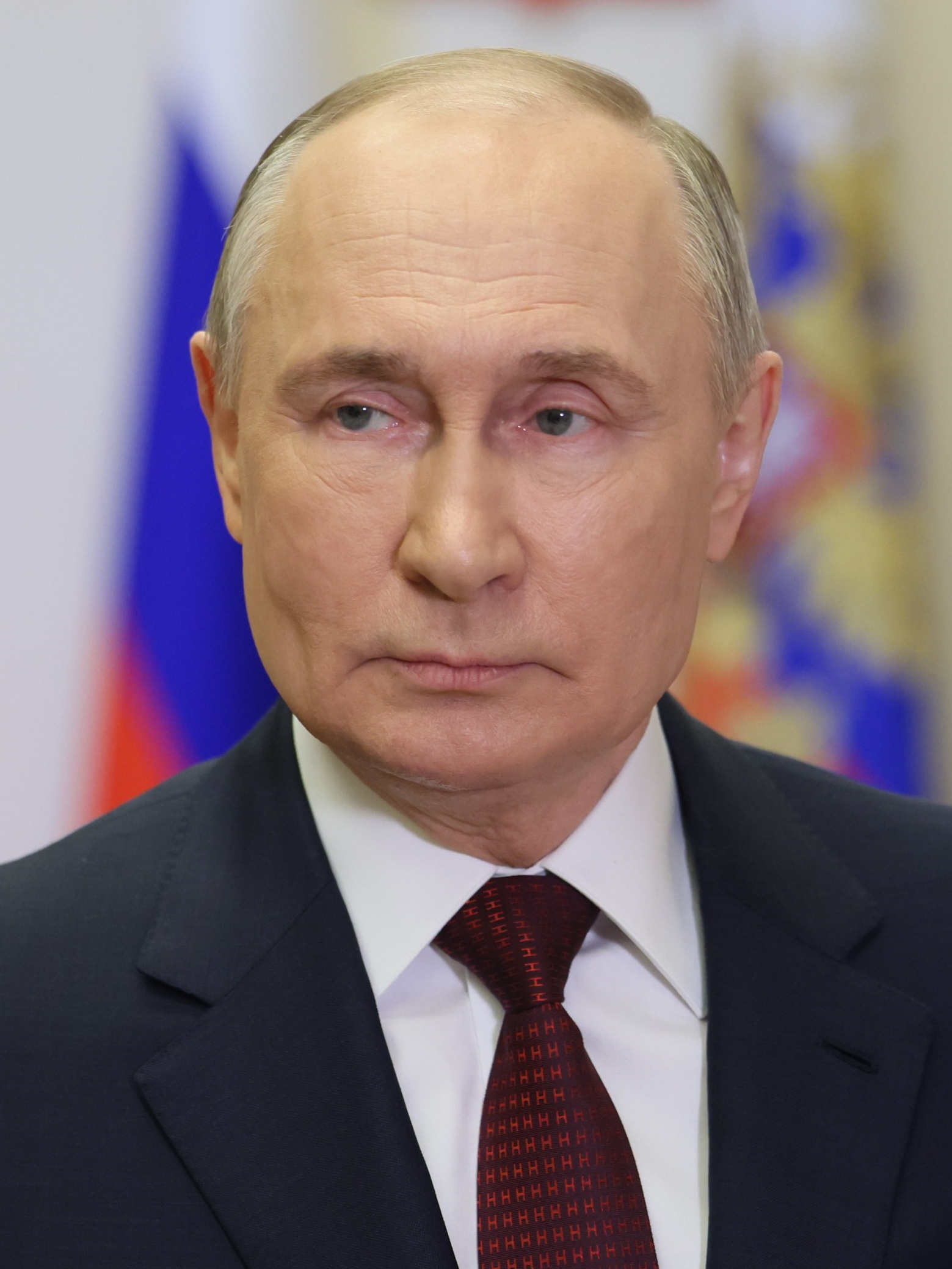
Russian President Vladimir Putin was ranked as the most powerful person four times.

Between 2009 and 2018 (with absence in 2017) the business magazine Forbes had compiled an annual list of the world's most powerful people. The list had one slot for every 100 million people, meaning in 2009 there were 67 people on the list, and by 2018, there were 75. Slots were allocated based on the amount of human and financial resources that they had sway over, as well as their influence on world events.

== Gallery of 2018 top ten rankings ==
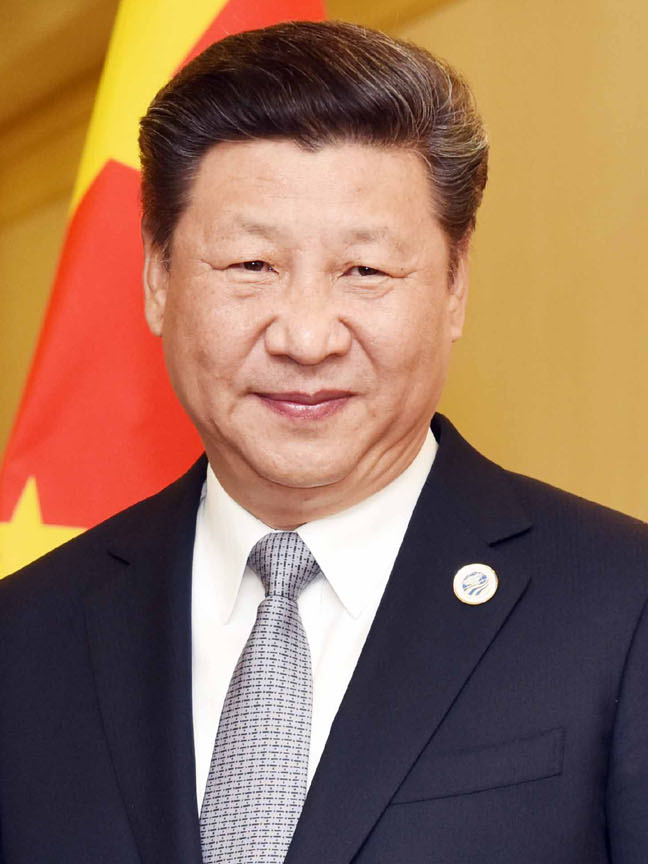
1. Xi Jinping

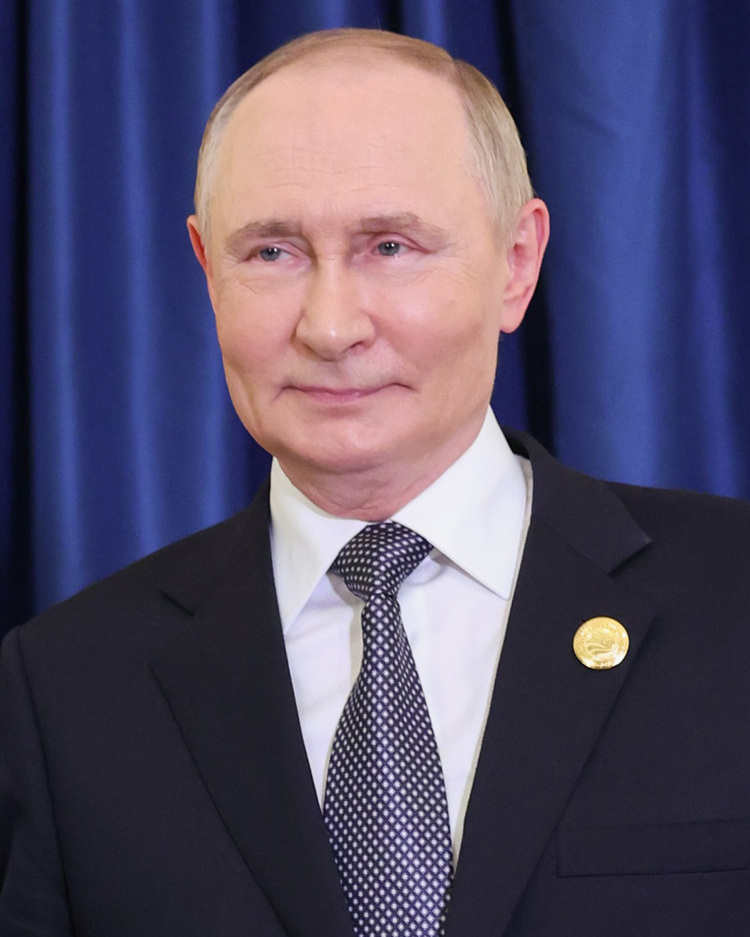
2. Vladimir Putin

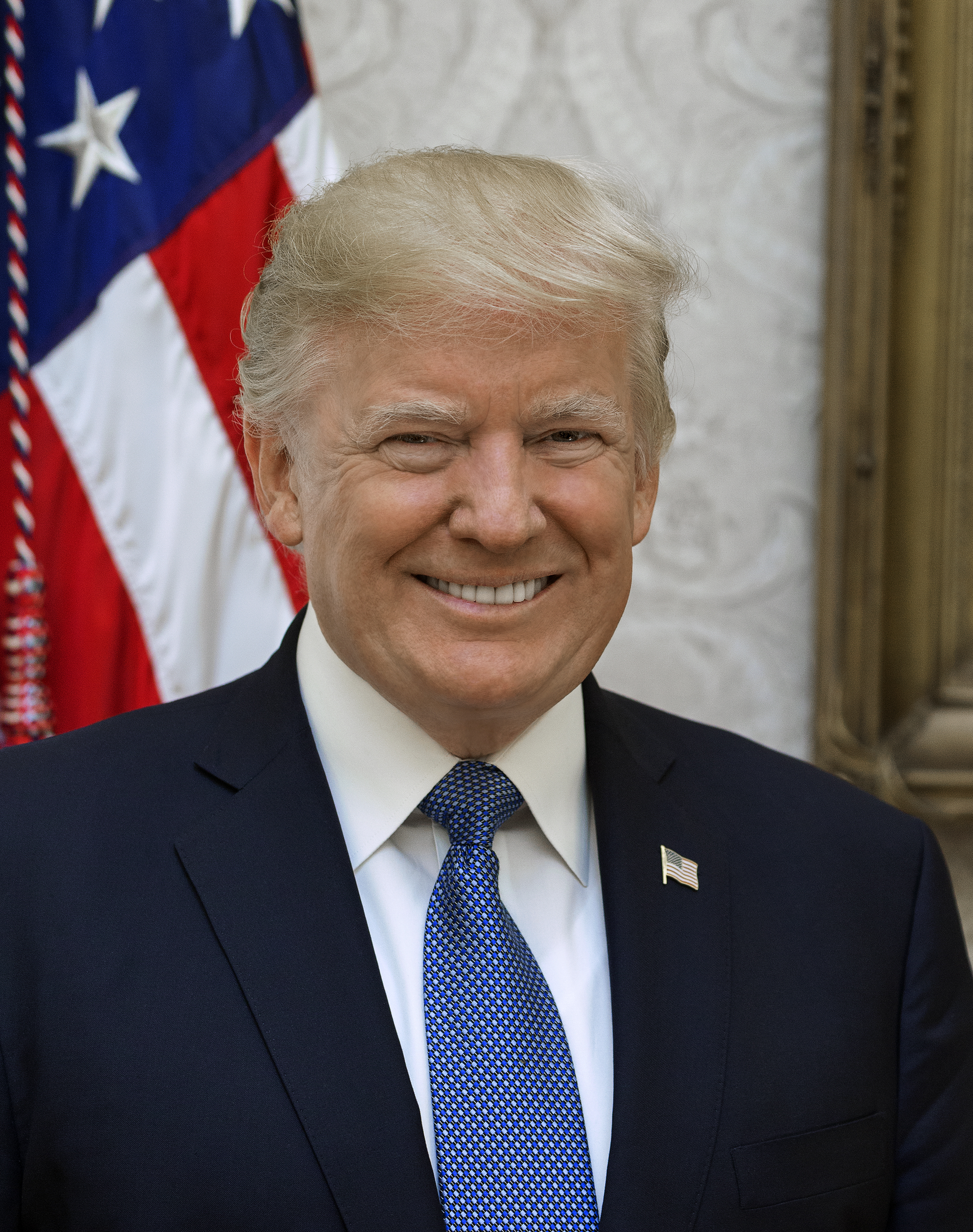
3. Donald Trump

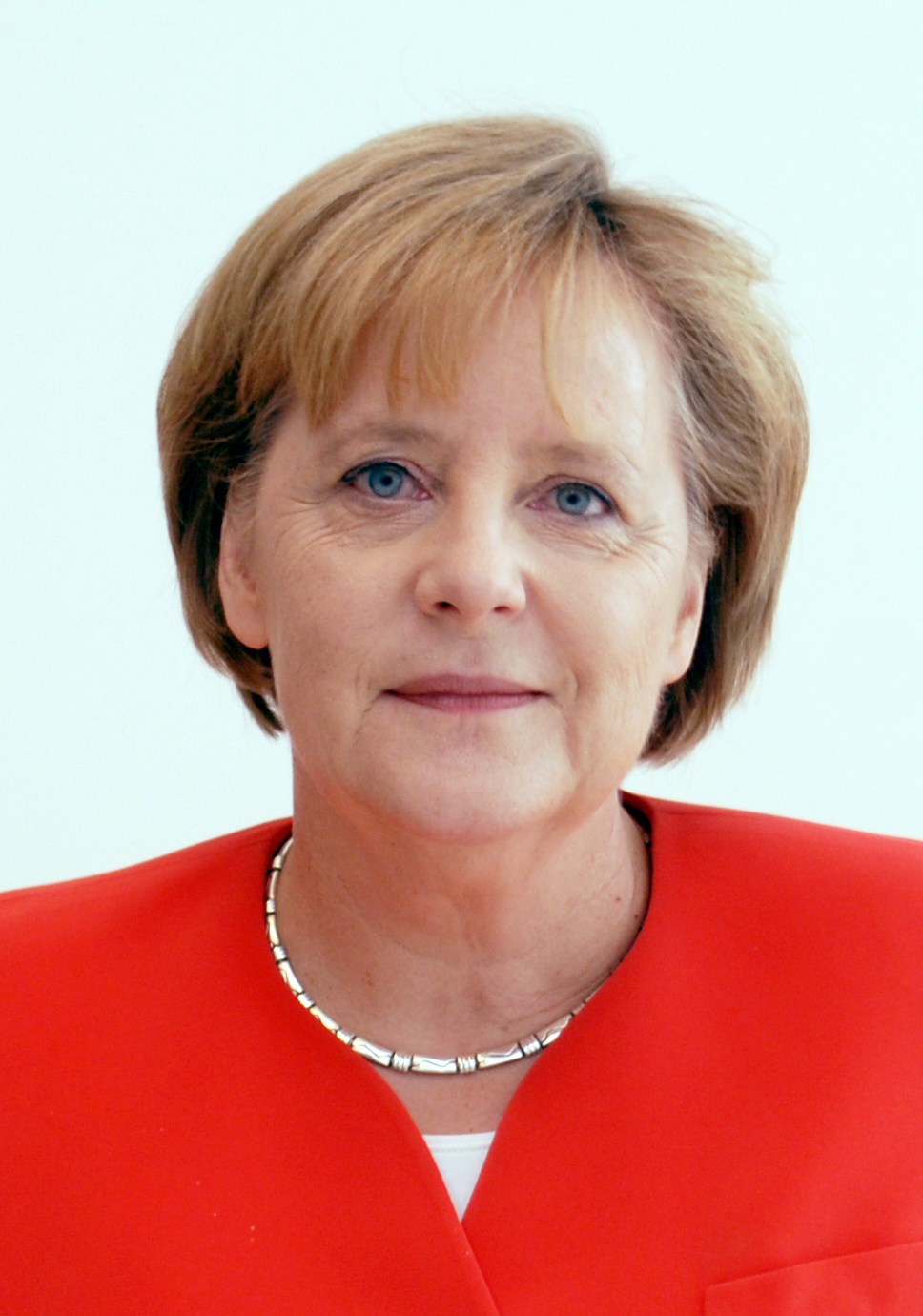
4. Angela Merkel

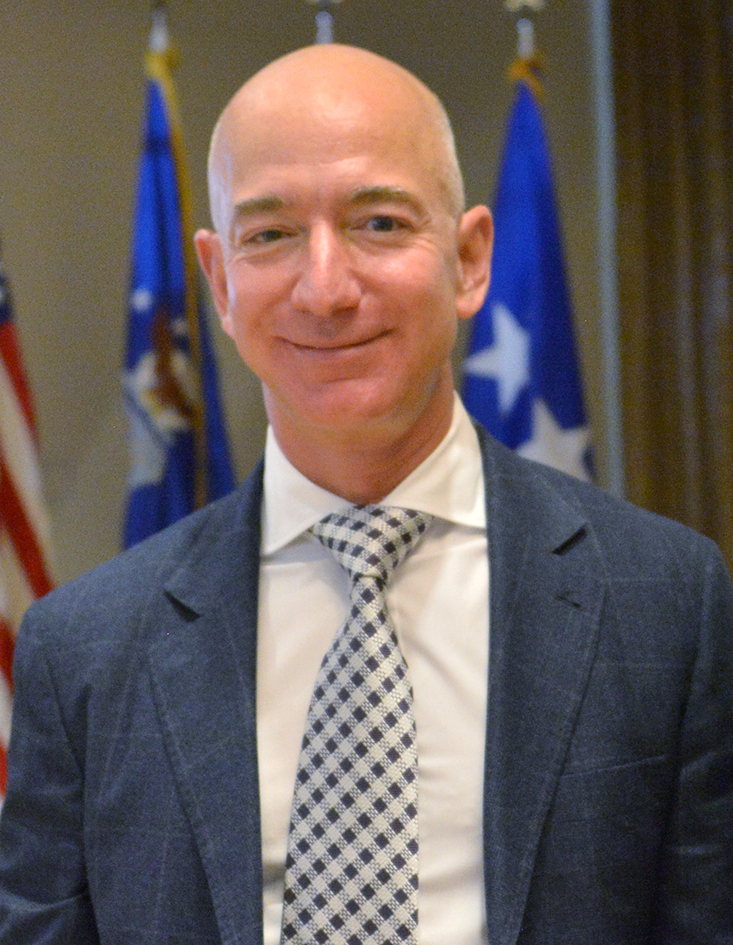
5. Jeff Bezos

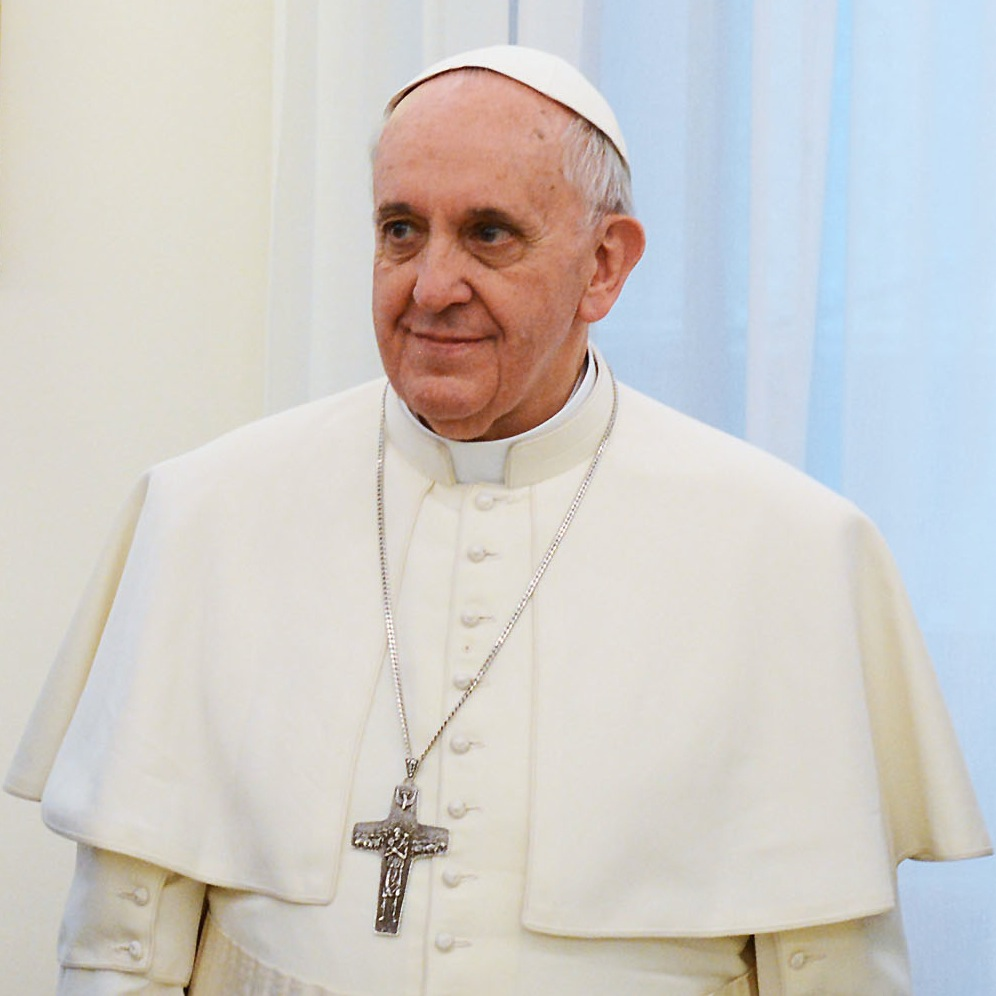
6. Pope Francis

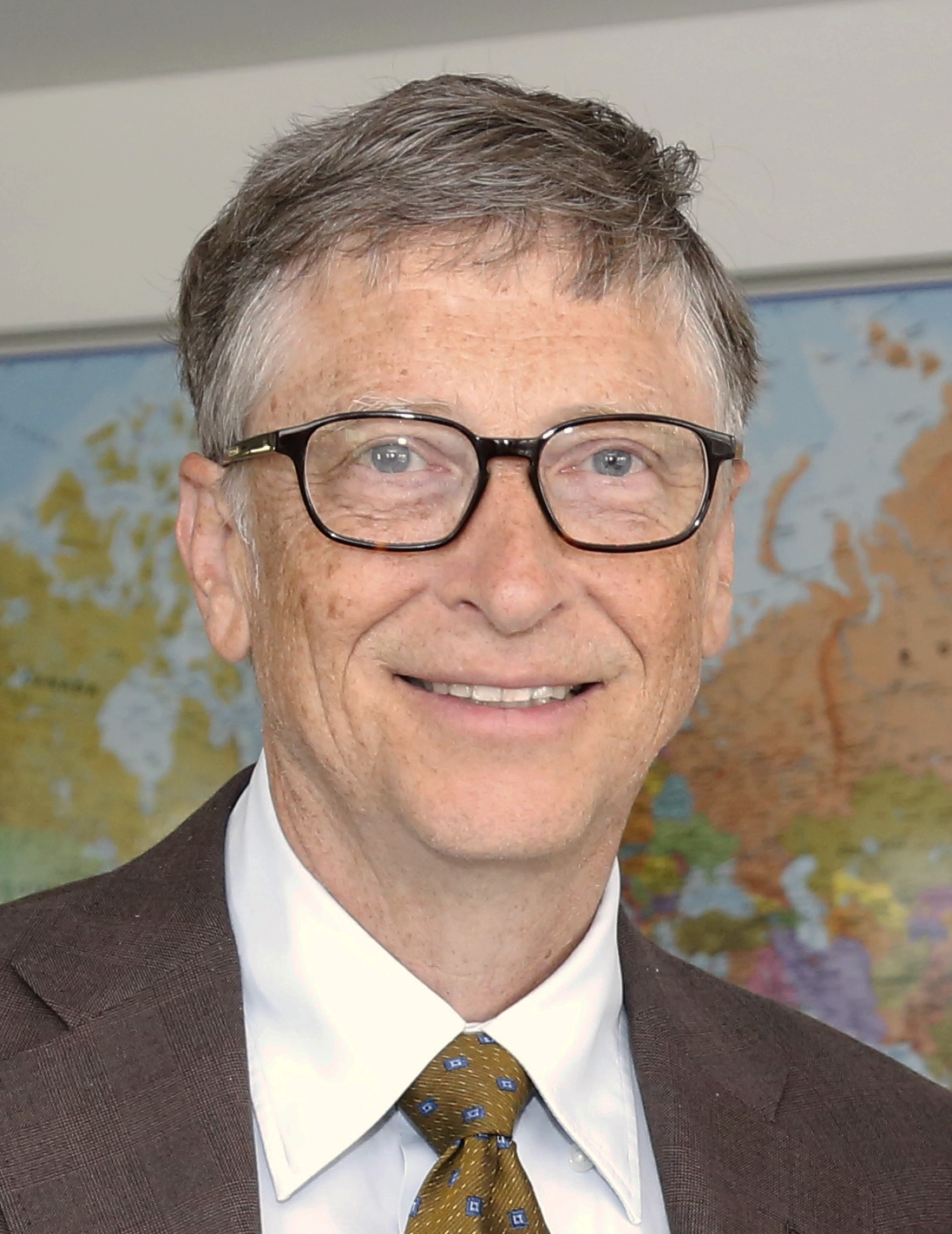
7. Bill Gates

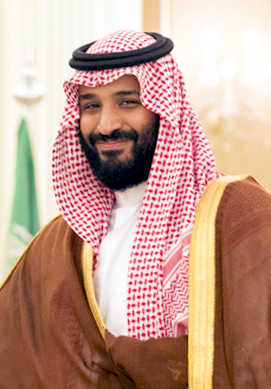
8. Mohammad bin Salman Al Saud

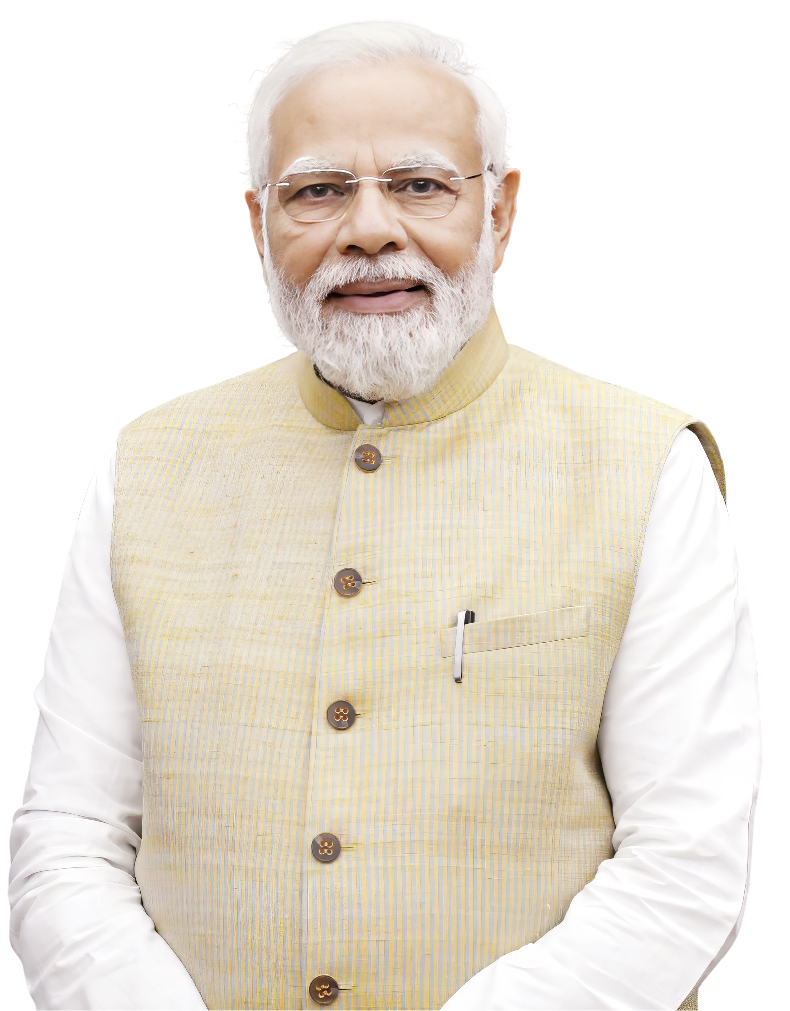
9. Narendra Modi

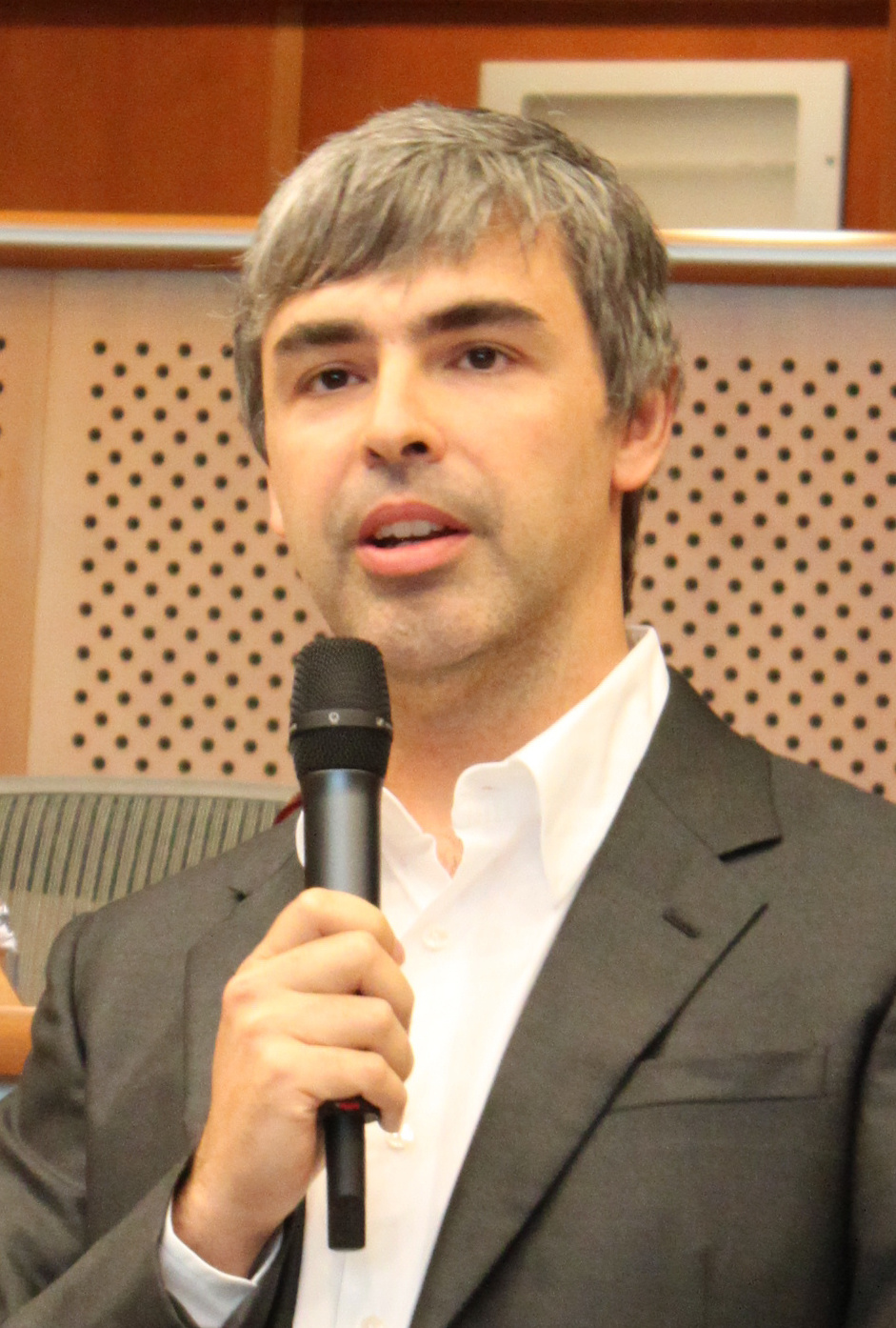
10. Larry Page

== Historical top ten rankings ==
Note: No list was released for 2017.

| | 2009 | 2010 | 2011 | 2012 | 2013 | 2014 | 2015 | 2016 | 2018 |
|---|---|---|---|---|---|---|---|---|---|
| 1 | Barack Obama President of the United States | ▲ (China) Hu Jintao General Secretary of the Chinese Communist Party | ▲ Barack Obama President of the United States | | ▲ Vladimir Putin President of Russia | | | | ▲ (China) Xi Jinping General Secretary of the Chinese Communist Party |
| 2 | (China) Hu Jintao General Secretary of the Chinese Communist Party | ▼ Barack Obama President of the United States | ▲ Vladimir Putin Prime Minister of Russia | ▲ Angela Merkel Chancellor of Germany | ▼ Barack Obama President of the United States | | ▲ Angela Merkel Chancellor of Germany | ▲ Donald Trump President-elect of the United States | ▼ Vladimir Putin President of Russia |
| 3 | Vladimir Putin Prime Minister of Russia | ▲ Abdullah bin Abdulaziz Al Saud King of Saudi Arabia | ▼ (China) Hu Jintao General Secretary of the Chinese Communist Party | ▼ Vladimir Putin President of Russia | ▲ (China) Xi Jinping General Secretary of the Chinese Communist Party | | ▼ Barack Obama President of the United States | ▼ Angela Merkel Chancellor of Germany | ▼ Donald Trump President of the United States |
| 4 | (United States) Ben Bernanke U.S. Chair of the Federal Reserve | ▼ Vladimir Putin Prime Minister of Russia | ▲ Angela Merkel Chancellor of Germany | ▲ (United States) Bill Gates Co-chair of the Gates Foundation; Founder of Microsoft | ▲ (Vatican City) Francis Pope of the Holy See | | | ▲ (China) Xi Jinping General Secretary of the Chinese Communist Party | ▼ Angela Merkel Chancellor of Germany |
| 5 | (United States) Sergey Brin (United States) Larry Page; Co-founders of Google | ▲ (Vatican City) Benedict XVI Pope of the Holy See | ▲ (United States) Bill Gates Co-chair of the Gates Foundation; Founder of Microsoft | ▲ (Vatican City) Benedict XVI Pope of the Holy See | ▼ Angela Merkel Chancellor of Germany | | ▼ (China) Xi Jinping General Secretary of the Chinese Communist Party | ▼ (Vatican City) Francis Pope of the Holy See | ▲ (United States) Jeff Bezos Chairman and CEO of Amazon |
| 6 | (Mexico) Carlos Slim Chief Executive of Telmex | ▲ Angela Merkel Chancellor of Germany | ▼ Abdullah bin Abdulaziz Al Saud King of Saudi Arabia | ▲ (United States) Ben Bernanke U.S. Chair of the Federal Reserve | ▼ (United States) Bill Gates Co-chair of the Gates Foundation; Founder of Microsoft | ▲ (United States) Janet Yellen U.S. Chair of the Federal Reserve | ▲ (United States) Bill Gates Co-chair of the Gates Foundation; Founder of Microsoft | ▲ (United States) Janet Yellen U.S. Chair of the Federal Reserve | ▼ (Vatican City) Francis Pope of the Holy See |
| 7 | (Australia) Rupert Murdoch Chairman of News Corporation | ▲ David Cameron Prime Minister of the United Kingdom | ▼ (Vatican City) Benedict XVI Pope of the Holy See | ▼ Abdullah bin Abdulaziz Al Saud King of Saudi Arabia | ▼ (United States) Ben Bernanke U.S. Chair of the Federal Reserve | ▼ (United States) Bill Gates Co-chair of the Gates Foundation; Founder of Microsoft | ▼ (United States) Janet Yellen U.S. Chair of the Federal Reserve | ▼ (United States) Bill Gates Co-chair of the Gates Foundation; Founder of Microsoft | |
| 8 | (United States) Mike Duke Chief Executive of Walmart | ▼ (United States) Ben Bernanke U.S. Chair of the Federal Reserve | | ▲ (Italy) Mario Draghi President of the European Central Bank | ▼ Abdullah bin Abdulaziz Al Saud King of Saudi Arabia | ▲ (Italy) Mario Draghi President of the European Central Bank | ▲ David Cameron Prime Minister of the United Kingdom | ▲ (United States) Larry Page Co-founder of Google | ▲ Mohammad bin Salman Al Saud Crown Prince of Saudi Arabia |
| 9 | Abdullah bin Abdulaziz Al Saud King of Saudi Arabia | ▲ (India) Sonia Gandhi President of the Indian National Congress | ▲ (United States) Mark Zuckerberg Founder and CEO of Facebook | ▲ (China) Xi Jinping General Secretary of the Chinese Communist Party | ▼ (Italy) Mario Draghi President of the European Central Bank | ▲ (United States) Sergey Brin ▲ (United States) Larry Page; Co-founders of Google | ▲ Narendra Modi Prime Minister of India | | |
| 10 | (United States) Bill Gates Co-chair of the Gates Foundation; Founder of Microsoft | | ▼ David Cameron Prime Minister of the United Kingdom | | ▲ (United States) Mike Duke Chief Executive of Walmart | ▲ David Cameron Prime Minister of the United Kingdom | ▼ (United States) Larry Page Co-founder of Google | ▲ (United States) Mark Zuckerberg Co-founder of Facebook | ▼ (United States) Larry Page Co-founder of Google |

== 2018 list ==
| Order | Name | Nationality | Position/Function |
|---|---|---|---|
| 1 | Xi Jinping | China | General Secretary of the Chinese Communist Party |
| 2 | Vladimir Putin | Russia | President of Russia |
| 3 | Donald Trump | United States | President of the United States (left office in 2021, returned in 2025) |
| 4 | Angela Merkel | Germany | Chancellor of Germany (left office in 2021) |
| 5 | Jeff Bezos | United States | CEO of Amazon |
| 6 | Pope Francis | Vatican City/Argentina | Bishop of Rome, Pope of the Catholic Church (died in 2025) |
| 7 | Bill Gates | United States | Founder of Microsoft |
| 8 | Mohammed bin Salman | Saudi Arabia | Crown Prince of Saudi Arabia |
| 9 | Narendra Modi | India | Prime Minister of India |
| 10 | Larry Page | United States | Co-founder of Google |
| 11 | Jerome Powell | United States | Chairman of the United States Federal Reserve |
| 12 | Emmanuel Macron | France | President of France |
| 13 | Mark Zuckerberg | United States | CEO of Facebook, Inc (renamed Meta Platforms, Inc in 2021) |
| 14 | Theresa May | United Kingdom | Prime Minister of the United Kingdom (resigned in 2019) |
| 15 | Li Keqiang | China | Premier of China (left office in 2023) |
| 16 | Warren Buffett | United States | Chairman and CEO of Berkshire Hathaway (resigned in 2026) |
| 17 | Ali Khamenei | Iran | Supreme Leader of Iran (died in 2026) |
| 18 | Mario Draghi | Italy | President of the European Central Bank (left office in 2019) |
| 19 | Jamie Dimon | United States | CEO of JPMorgan Chase |
| 20 | Carlos Slim | Mexico | Chairman of Telmex, Chairman Emeritus of América Móvil |
| 21 | Jack Ma | China | Founder of Alibaba |
| 22 | Christine Lagarde | France | Director of the International Monetary Fund (later President of the European Central Bank) |
| 23 | Doug McMillon | United States | CEO of Walmart |
| 24 | Tim Cook | United States | CEO of Apple Inc. |
| 25 | Elon Musk | South Africa, Canada and United States | Founder and CEO of SpaceX, CEO of Tesla |
| 26 | Benjamin Netanyahu | Israel | Prime Minister of Israel (left office in 2021, returned in 2022) |
| 27 | Ma Huateng | China | Chairman and CEO of Tencent |
| 28 | Larry Fink | United States | Co-founder and CEO of BlackRock |
| 29 | Akio Toyoda | Japan | Chairman of Toyota |
| 30 | John L. Flannery | United States | CEO of General Electric (removed in 2018) |
| 31 | António Guterres | Portugal | Secretary-General of the United Nations |
| 32 | Mukesh Ambani | India | Chairman of Reliance Industries |
| 33 | Jean-Claude Juncker | Luxemburg | President of the European Commission (left office in 2019) |
| 34 | Darren Woods | United States | CEO of ExxonMobil |
| 35 | Sergey Brin | United States | Co-founder of Google, President of Alphabet (resigned in 2019) |
| 36 | Kim Jong Un | North Korea | Supreme Leader of North Korea |
| 37 | Charles Koch | United States | Chairman and CEO of Koch, Inc. |
| 38 | Shinzo Abe | Japan | Prime Minister of Japan (resigned in 2020, died in 2022) |
| 39 | Rupert Murdoch | United States | Chairman of News Corp (resigned in 2023) |
| 40 | Satya Nadella | United States | Chairman and CEO of Microsoft |
| 41 | Jim Yong Kim | United States | President of the World Bank (resigned in 2019) |
| 42 | Stephen A. Schwarzman | United States | Chairman and CEO of Blackstone Group |
| 43 | Khalifa bin Zayed Al Nahyan | United Arab Emirates | President of the United Arab Emirates (died in 2022) |
| 44 | Haruhiko Kuroda | Japan | Governor of the Bank of Japan (resigned in 2023) |
| 45 | Abdel Fattah el-Sisi | Egypt | President of Egypt |
| 46 | Li Ka-shing | China | Chairman of CK Hutchison Holdings (resigned in May 2018) |
| 47 | Lloyd Blankfein | United States | CEO of Goldman Sachs (resigned at the end of 2018) |
| 48 | Recep Tayyip Erdoğan | Turkey | President of Turkey |
| 49 | Bob Iger | United States | CEO of The Walt Disney Company (resigned in 2020, returned in 2022, resigned again in 2026) |
| 50 | Michel Temer | Brazil | President of Brazil (left office in 2019) |
| 51 | Michael Bloomberg | United States | Founder and CEO of Bloomberg (resigned in 2023) |
| 52 | Wang Jianlin | China | Chairman, founder, and majority shareholder of Dalian Wanda Group |
| 53 | Mary Barra | United States | Chair of Board and CEO of General Motors |
| 54 | Moon Jae-in | South Korea | President of South Korea (left office in 2022) |
| 55 | Masayoshi Son | Japan | Founder, chairman and CEO of SoftBank |
| 56 | Bernard Arnault | France | Founder, chairman and CEO of LVMH |
| 57 | Justin Trudeau | Canada | Prime Minister of Canada (resigned in 2025) |
| 58 | Robin Li | China | CEO of Baidu |
| 59 | Michael Dell | United States | Founder, chairman and CEO of Dell Technologies |
| 60 | Hui Ka Yan | China | Chairman and Communist Party secretary of Evergrande Group |
| 61 | Lee Hsien Loong | Singapore | Prime Minister of Singapore (resigned in 2024) |
| 62 | Bashar al-Assad | Syria | President of Syria (removed from office in 2024) |
| 63 | John Roberts | United States | Chief Justice of the United States |
| 64 | Enrique Peña Nieto | Mexico | President of Mexico (left office in December 2018) |
| 65 | Kenneth C. Griffin | United States | Chairman of Citadel Investment Group |
| 66 | Aliko Dangote | Nigeria | President and CEO of Dangote Group |
| 67 | Mike Pence | United States | Vice President of the United States (left office in 2021) |
| 68 | Qamar Javed Bajwa | Pakistan | de facto Commander-in-Chief of the Pakistan Armed Forces (retired in 2022) |
| 69 | Rodrigo Duterte | Philippines | President of the Philippines (left office in 2022) |
| 70 | Abigail Johnson | United States | CEO of Fidelity Investments |
| 71 | Reed Hastings | United States | Founder and chairman of Netflix |
| 72 | Robert Mueller | United States | Special Counsel for the United States Department of Justice (office abolished in 2019) |
| 73 | Abu Bakr al-Baghdadi | Iraq | Self-proclaimed Caliph of the Islamic State (died in 2019) |
| 74 | Joko Widodo | Indonesia | President of Indonesia (left office in 2024) |
| 75 | Gianni Infantino | Switzerland | President of FIFA |

== Listed seven or more times ==
=== Listed every time ===
- Mukesh Ambani
- Lloyd Blankfein
- Michael Bloomberg
- Sergey Brin
- Warren Buffett
- Jamie Dimon
- Larry Fink
- Bill Gates
- Li Ka-shing
- Ali Khamenei
- Angela Merkel
- Rupert Murdoch
- Benjamin Netanyahu
- Larry Page
- Vladimir Putin
- Carlos Slim

=== Listed eight times ===
- Bernard Arnault (not listed: 2016)
- Jeff Bezos (not listed: 2009)
- Jeff Immelt (not listed: 2018)
- Khalifa bin Zayed Al Nahyan (not listed: 2009)
- Charles Koch (not listed: 2009)
- Robin Li (not listed: 2009)
- Barack Obama (not listed: 2018)
- Masayoshi Son (not listed: 2009)
- Rex Tillerson (not listed: 2018)
- Mark Zuckerberg (not listed: 2009)

=== Listed seven times ===
- Tim Cook (not listed: 2009 and 2010)
- Mario Draghi (not listed: 2009 and 2010)
- Xi Jinping (not listed: 2009 and 2010)
- Christine Lagarde (not listed: 2009 and 2010)
- Lakshmi Mittal (not listed: 2016 and 2018)
- John Roberts (not listed: 2010 and 2011)
- Akio Toyoda (not listed: 2010 and 2011)

== See also ==
- Forbes list of the World's 100 Most Powerful Women
- Time 100
- Time 100: The Most Important People of the Century
- Forbes list of the world's highest-paid athletes
- Forbes Global 2000
- The World's Billionaires
- 40 Under 40
- QS World University Rankings
