= John Furner =

American business executive (born 1974)

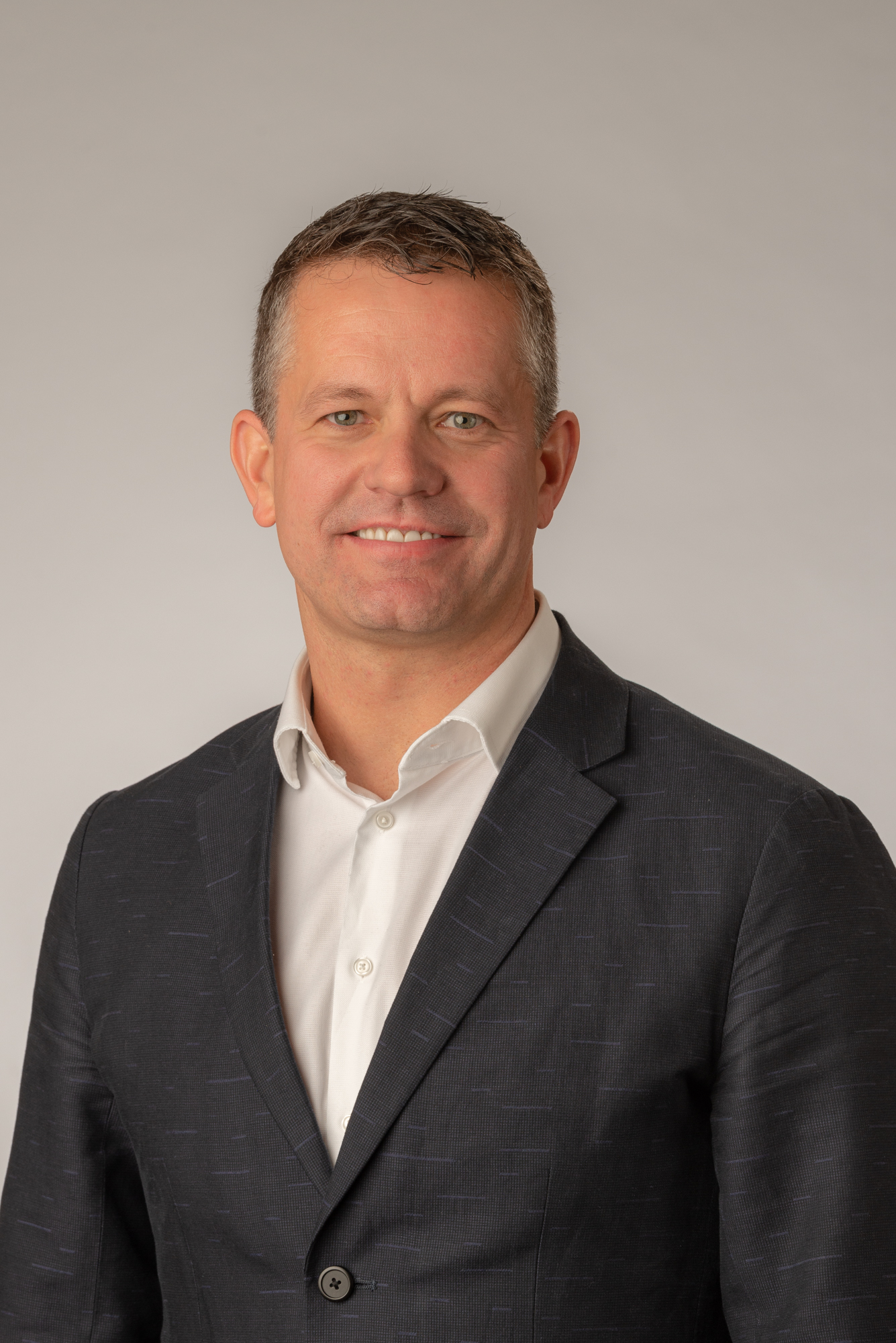
- Furner in 2019

President and CEO, Walmart Inc.
- In office February 1, 2026 - present
- Preceded by: Doug McMillon

President and CEO, Walmart U.S.
- In office November 2019 - January 2026
- Preceded by: Greg Foran
- Succeeded by: David Guggina

CEO, Sam's Club
- In office February 2017 - November 2019
- Preceded by: Rosalind Brewer
- Succeeded by: Kathryn McLay

Personal details
- Born: 1974 (age 51–52) Jacksonville, Arkansas
- Children: 4
- Education: University of Arkansas (BSBA)

John Furner is an American business executive who is the president and chief executive officer (CEO) of Walmart Inc. He was president and CEO of Walmart U.S. from 2019 to 2026, and CEO of Sam's Club from 2017 to 2019. Furner succeeded Doug McMillon, who retired in January 2026.

== Early life and education ==
Furner was born in 1974 in Jacksonville, Arkansas. He attended Sam M. Walton College of Business at the University of Arkansas, and earned Bachelor of Science in Business Administration in Marketing Management.

== Career ==
Furner began his career at Walmart in 1993 as an hourly store associate. He later became a store manager, district manager, and buyer. He became CEO of Sam's Club on February 1, 2017, after working as Sam's Club's chief merchandising officer and, prior that, spending nearly three years in Walmart's international division as EVP of merchandising and marketing for Walmart China.

At Sam's Club, Furner closed 63 stores to better compete with Costco. The Wall Street Journal reported that sales increased during his time as CEO. Based on his experience at Walmart China, Furner focused on increasing the use of technology in Sam's Club warehouses and narrowing its targeted customer. Furner also focused on increasing Sam's Club's private brand business.

Furner became president and CEO of Walmart U.S. in November 2019. He replaced Doug McMillon as CEO of Walmart Inc. in February 2026.

== Personal life ==
Furner is married with four children. He is board chairman of the National Retail Federation and was a board member of Medal of Honor Foundation in 2020.

Business positions
Preceded by Doug McMillon	President of Walmart; 2026–	Incumbent
