= Más Club =

Defunct retail warehouse club in Houston

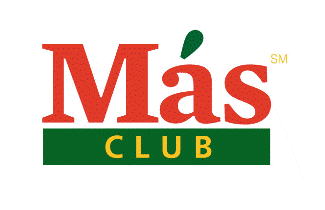
- Type: Subsidiary
- Industry: Retailing (Warehouse club)
- Founded: Houston, Texas, U.S. (August 6, 2009)
- Defunct: Houston, Texas, U.S. (February 7, 2014)
- Fate: Liquidation sale
- Headquarters: Bentonville, Arkansas, U.S.
- Number of locations: 1 (2009)
- Area served: Houston, Texas
- Key people: Michael T. Duke, President and CEO of Wal-Mart Stores, Inc. (parent); Noe Cantu, Más Club Manager
- Products: Merchandise
- Parent: Walmart

Más Club was an American membership-only retail warehouse club focused on the Hispanic population. Founded in 2009, it was owned and operated by Walmart. It opened on August 6, 2009, with a single pilot store in Houston, Texas and officially closed its doors on February 7, 2014.

== Location ==
Más Club was located on the north side of Houston at 8711 North Freeway. The 87,000 square feet of shopping space offered a product assortment including fresh foods (bakery, produce, meat, tortillas, seafood and café); imported dry grocery items, candy, snacks and beverages; and electronics, housewares and seasonal items. The club also included a pharmacy, optical center and Barri money-transfer center.

The building was designed with environmentally friendly building materials such as low-flow bathroom fixtures with automatic sensors and skylights to reduce energy used for overhead lighting.

== Product assortment ==
Más Club carried a wide selection of brands recognized by Hispanic consumers including Jarritos sodas, De La Rosa candy and Maseca grocery items. Más Club also offered fresh produce, a full-service meat and seafood counter, pharmacy, café and bakery with products like fresh Bolillos, Hispanic pastries and cakes. Members can also enjoy outdoor seating at the café.

== Target demographic ==
The Más Club location was designed to serve Hispanic business owners and families. The location in Houston engaged a primarily Mexican membership base. Más Club was the first membership warehouse club in the United States dedicated to Hispanic product assortment. The retailer differentiated itself from its American counterpart Sam’s Club by offering Hispanic items and fresh produce such as tomatillos, cactus, dry hot peppers, roots and squashes.

The retailer got its name from the Spanish word for more, as in more selection of imported merchandise for Latino consumers. Coincidentally, Más is also Sam spelled backward, an unintentional nod to the company’s founder, Sam Walton.

The store's bright orange, green and red signs are in Spanish, with English subtitles.

Más Club memberships were divided into two categories: Business and Advantage. Both memberships cost $30 per year. Sam’s Club and Más Club memberships were not interchangeable.
