= Sam's Club =

American membership-only warehouse club chain

Sam's West, Inc.
- Logo used since 2026

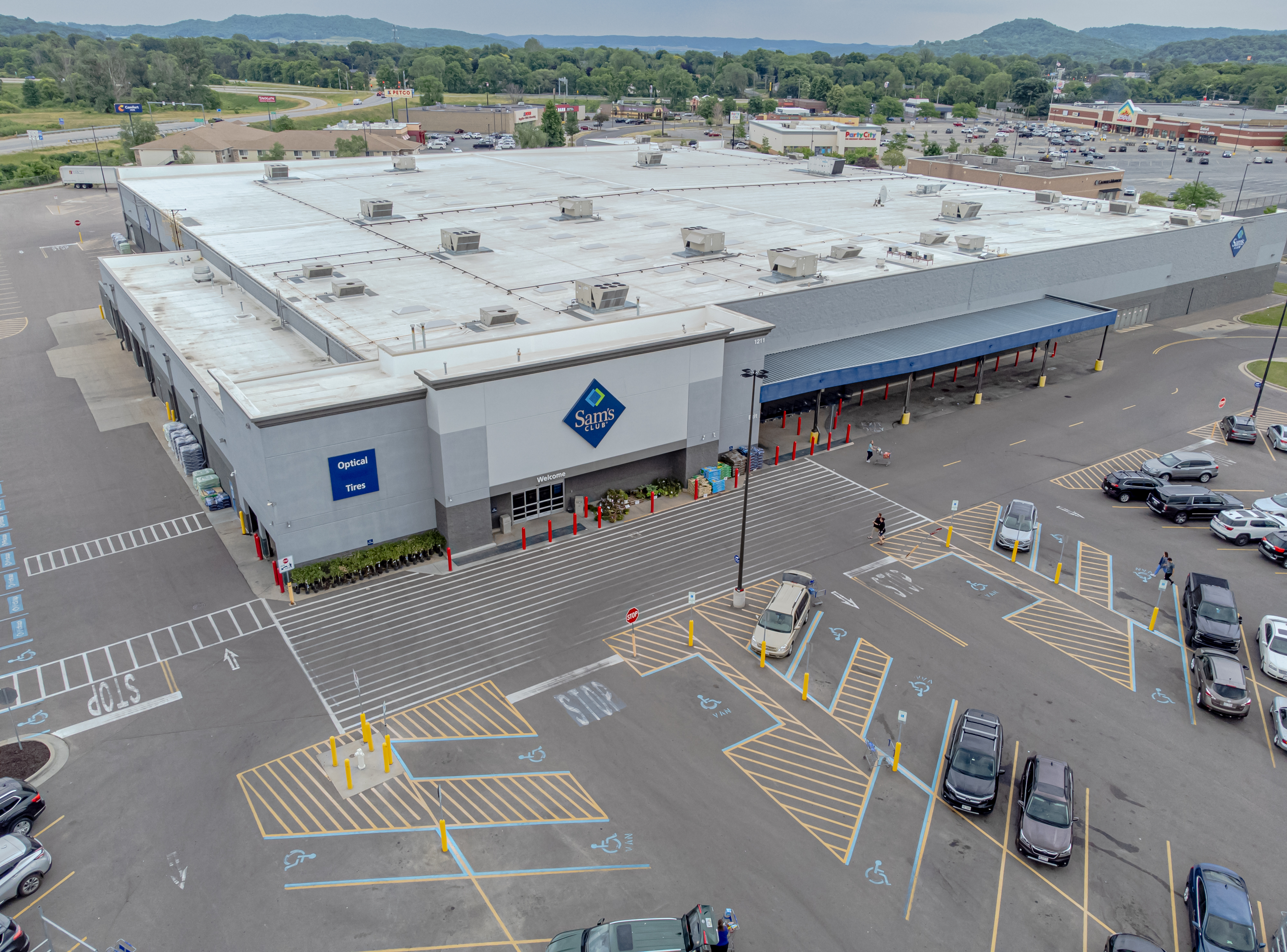
- Sam's Club in Onalaska, Wisconsin
- Trade name: Sam's Club
- Formerly: Sam's Wholesale Club (1983-1990)
- Type: Subsidiary
- Industry: Retail
- Founded: April 7, 1983; 43 years ago, in Midwest City, Oklahoma, U.S.
- Founder: Sam Walton
- Headquarters: Bentonville, Arkansas, U.S.
- Number of locations: 600 U.S. (as of May 18, 2025)
- Areas served: United States; Mexico; China; Brazil (Legally independent)
- Key people: Latriece Watkins (president and CEO)
- Products: Merchandise; Cash & carry; Warehouse club; Gas stations; Tire shops
- Brands: Simply Right; Member's Mark; Bakers & Chefs; Daily Chef; Richelieu Foods
- Members: ▲69 million (2022)
- Number of employees: ▲100,000 (2024)
- Parent: Walmart (1983–present)
- Website: www.samsclub.com

Sam's West, Inc. (doing business as Sam's Club) is a subsidiary of Walmart that operates a chain of membership-only warehouse club retail stores. Founded in 1983 as Sam's Wholesale Club, it was named after Walmart founder Sam Walton. As of January 31, 2025, Sam's Club ranked second in sales volume among warehouse clubs with $100.8 billion in sales, ahead of BJ's Wholesale Club but behind its main rival Costco.

As of May 18, 2026, Sam's Club operated 602 membership warehouse clubs in the United States across 44 states and Puerto Rico, with no locations in Alaska, Massachusetts, Oregon, Rhode Island, Washington, or Vermont. Sam's Club offers car wash services at gas stations in 41 locations.

Outside of the United States, Sam's Club operates 173 locations in Mexico and 48 locations in China. Grupo Big, formerly Walmart Brazil, which was de-consolidated from Walmart in August 2018 and since then is part of Carrefour Group, also operates 58 Sam's Club locations in Brazil, using the Sam's Club name under license. Locations generally range in size from 32,000 to 168,000 sq ft (3,000 to 15,600 m^{2}), with an average club size of approximately 134,000 sq ft (12,400 m^{2}). Sam's Club had six locations in Canada from 2003 to 2009.

== History ==
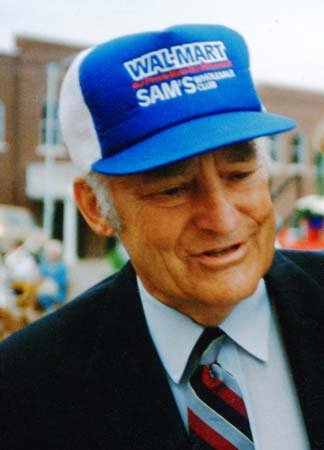
Founder Sam Walton

First Sam's Wholesale Club logo used from 1983 to 1989

Former Sam's Club logo, used from 2001 to 2006, with slogan

Former Sam's Club logo, used from 2006 to 2019 (still used in China)

Former Sam's Club logo, used from 2019 to 2026

Map of Walmart locations in the United States, as of January 2025

Costco vs Sam's Club locations in the United States

Sam Walton opened the first Sam's Wholesale Club on April 7, 1983, in Midwest City, Oklahoma, 21 years after he founded Walmart.

In 1987, Wal-Mart Stores purchased West Monroe, Louisiana-based SuperSaver Wholesale Warehouse Club; the purchase expanded the Sam's Wholesale Club chain by 24 locations. Prior to the acquisition, the stores were owned by Alton Hardy Howard and his son John.

In 1989, Sam's Wholesale Club opened its first club in New Jersey in a former Two Guys/Jefferson Ward store located in Delran. This was Walmart's first expansion into the Northeast.

In 1990, Sam's Wholesale Club was renamed Sam's Club, dropping off "Wholesale". The same year, the first Sam's Club opened in Pennsylvania.

In 1993, Walmart acquired PACE Membership Warehouse from K-mart and converted a majority of PACE locations into Sam's Club stores.

Sam's Club entered the Canadian market in Southern Ontario (all but one in the Greater Toronto Area/Golden Horseshoe) in 2003.

The latest flagship club opening as of September 13, 2007, was in Fayetteville, Arkansas. The largest Sam's Club store is located in Pineville, North Carolina, with 185,000 sq ft (17,200 m^{2}) of retail space that was formerly an Incredible Universe.

On September 24, 2006, Sam's Club unveiled a new logo with an updated serif font.

Starting in April 2007, there was speculation of a possible sale or spinoff of Sam's Club from parent company Wal-Mart Stores, Inc.

On February 26, 2009, Walmart Canada announced that it would be closing all six of its Canadian Sam's Club locations. This was part of Walmart Canada's decision to shift focus towards other superstores, but some industry observers suggested that the operation was struggling in competition with Costco and the non-membership The Real Canadian Superstore, that had a well-established history in the country. Sam's Club also rebranded the two as yet unopened locations as new Wal-Mart stores. In January 2010, it was announced that ten clubs would be closing, including four in California. At the same time, Sam's opened six new clubs at various locations in the United States.

On January 24, 2010, it was announced that approximately 11,200 Sam's Club employees would be laid off. The layoffs resulted from the decision to outsource product sampling duties to an outside company (Rogers, Arkansas-based Shopper Events, which already performed in-store product demonstrations for Walmart) and to eliminate New Business Membership Representative positions throughout the chain. Most of the laid-off employees were part-time and represented about 10% of the total Sam's Club workforce.

Rosalind Brewer was named as the new CEO for Sam's Club, a change that came into effect on February 1, 2012.

On January 24, 2014, it was announced that Walmart would cut 2,300 jobs at underperforming Sam's Club locations.

In 2016, Sam's Club rolled out a mobile application that allowed users to scan items while they shop and pay for them, skipping the checkout line. By December 2016, the app could be used at all locations in the United States. In 2019, the dedicated scanning app was deprecated, and its features were incorporated into the main Sam's Club app.

On February 1, 2017, John Furner replaced Brewer as CEO of Sam's Club.

On January 11, 2018, Walmart announced that 63 Sam's Club locations in cities including Memphis, Houston, Seattle, and others would be closing. Some of the stores had already liquidated, without notifying employees, some employees learned by a company-wide email delivered January 11. All of the 63 stores were gone from the Sam's Club website as of the morning of January 11, 2018. Walmart said that ten of the stores would become e-commerce distribution centers and employees could reapply to work at those locations. Business Insider magazine calculated that over 11,000 workers would be affected. On the same day, Walmart announced that as a result of the new tax law, it would be raising Walmart starting wages, distributing bonuses, expanding its leave policies and contributing toward the cost of employees' adoptions. Doug McMillon, Walmart's CEO, said, "We are early in the stages of assessing the opportunities tax reform creates for us to invest in our customers and associates and to further strengthen our business, all of which should benefit our shareholders."

On November 15, 2019, Kathryn McLay succeeded Furner as CEO of Sam's Club. McLay announced plans in 2023 for the company to build 30 stores. She became CEO of Walmart International in 2023 and was succeeded as Sam's Club CEO by Christopher Nicholas.

As of January 2024, Sam's Club used an artificial intelligence-based receipt-checking technology at 10 stores that required customers to move through a portal to verify purchases. The company announced plans to put the technology in all of its stores by the end of 2024.

In April 2025, Sam's Club announced the nationwide implementation of its AI-powered receipt verification technology across all 600 US locations.

== Design ==
Like other warehouse clubs, Sam's Club sells most of its merchandise in bulk and directly off pallets. The clubs are arranged like warehouses, with merchandise stocked in steel bins. Products sold include jewelry, designer goods, sunglasses, crystal, and collectibles, electronics, floral, apparel, food, and meats. Most locations have Pharmacy, Tire and Battery, Photo (as of late 2019, photo was cut from most clubs), Bakery, Optical, Café, and Floral departments.

Sam's Club consolidated its private labels under the Member's Mark brand in 2017. Sam's Club does not sell the Sam's Choice or Great Value brands that are available in Walmart stores.

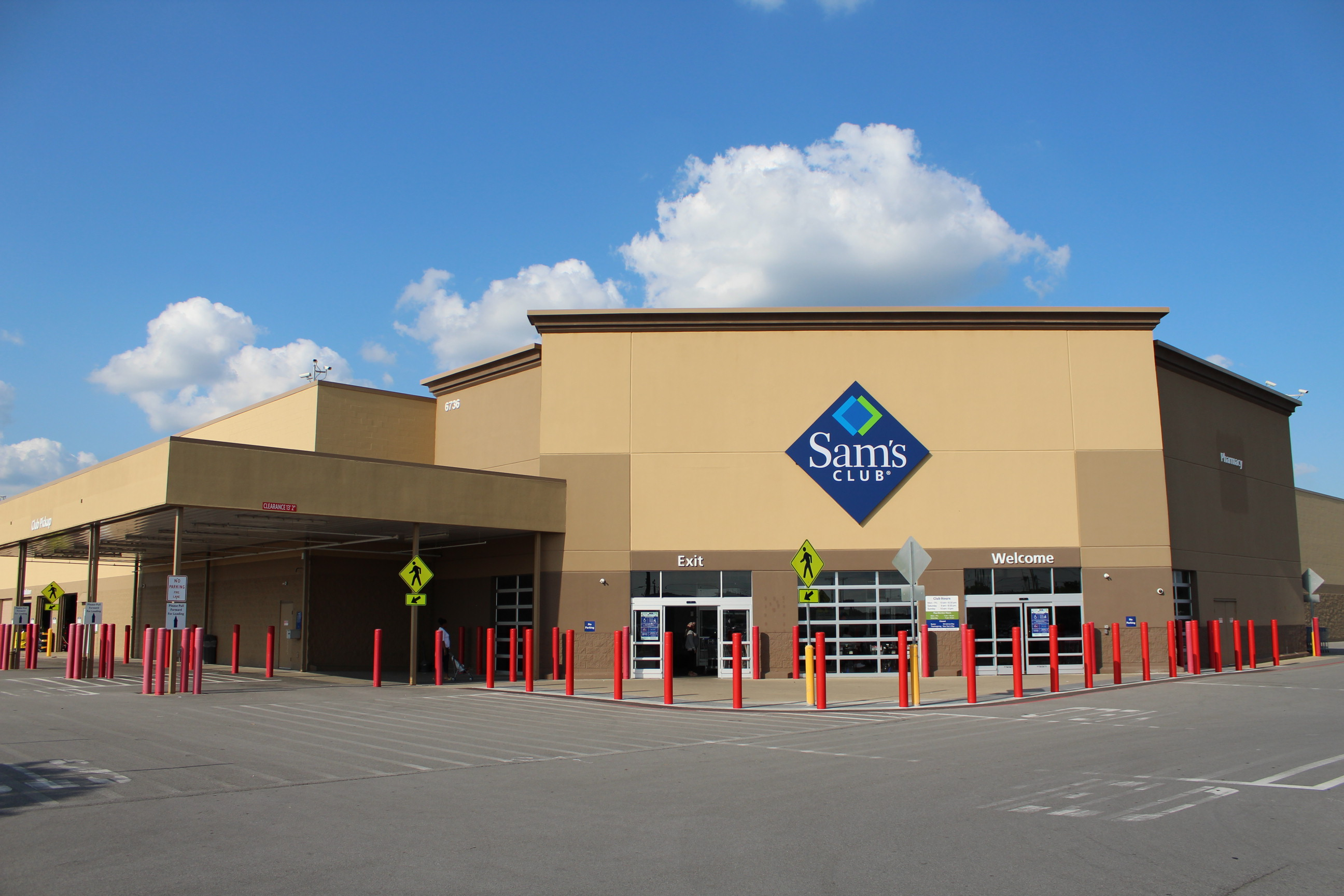
A Sam's Club store in Fort Wayne, Indiana, United States

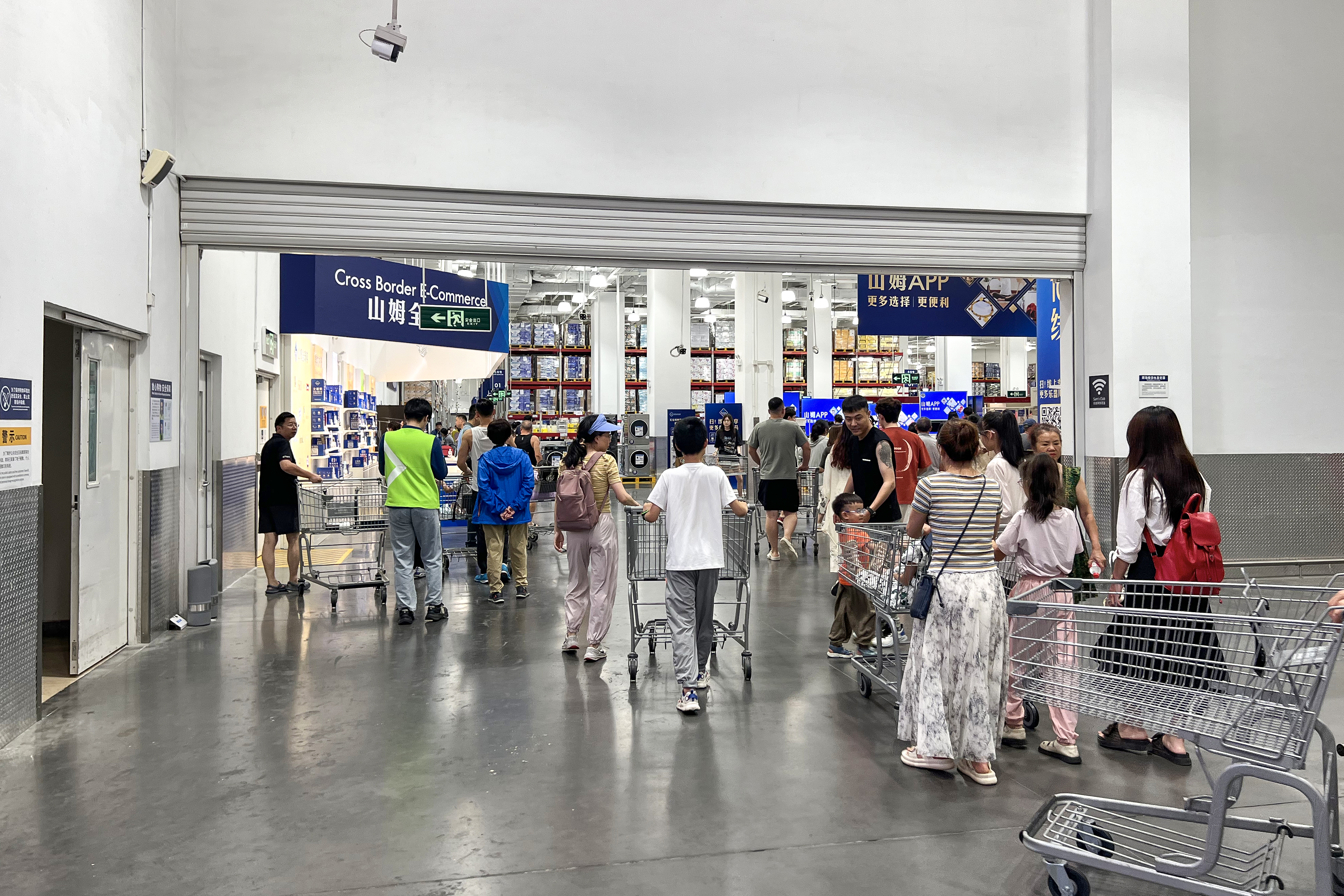
Entrance of a Sam's Club store in Beijing, China

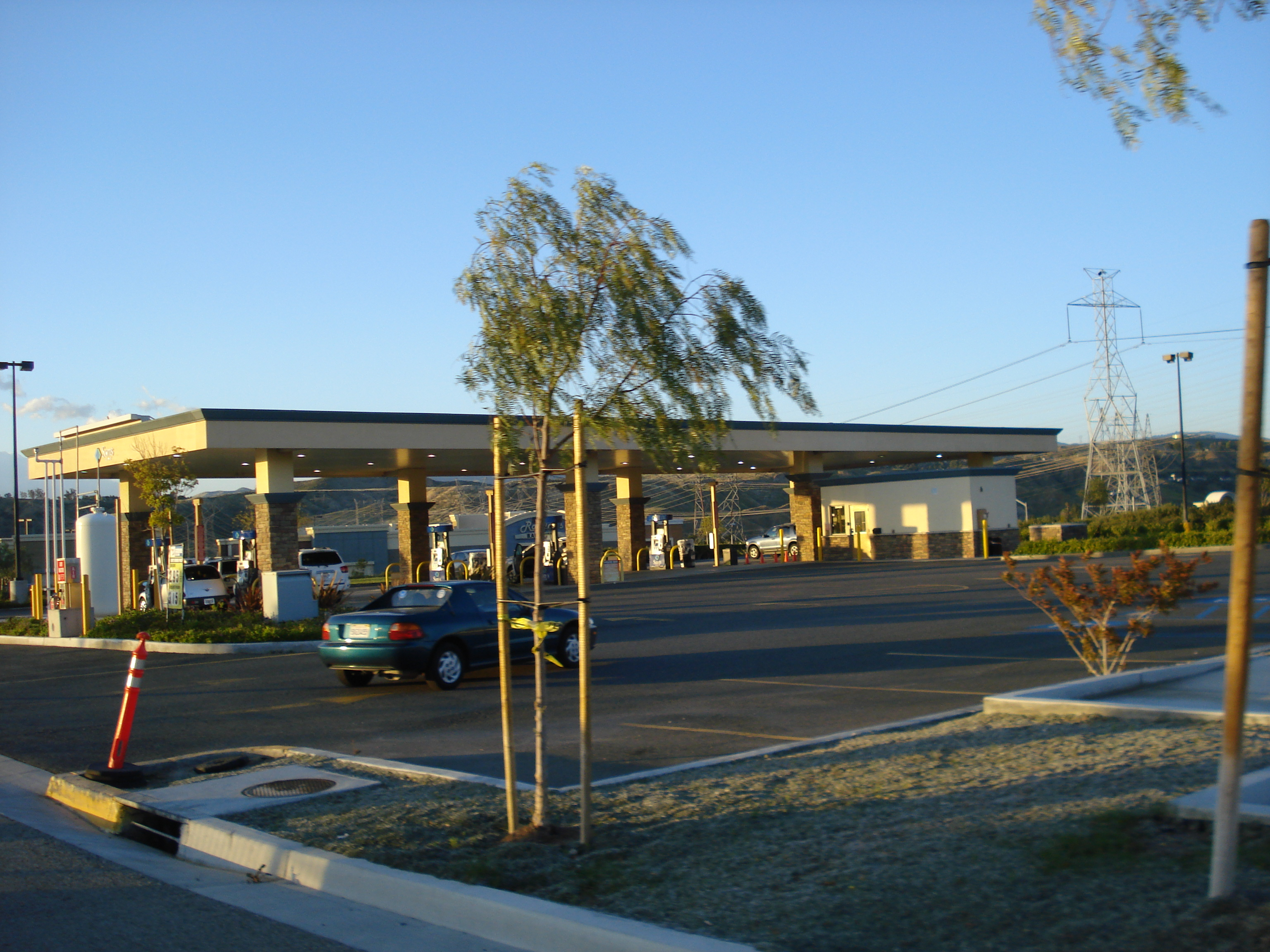
A Sam's Club gas station at a store in Santa Clarita, California, United States

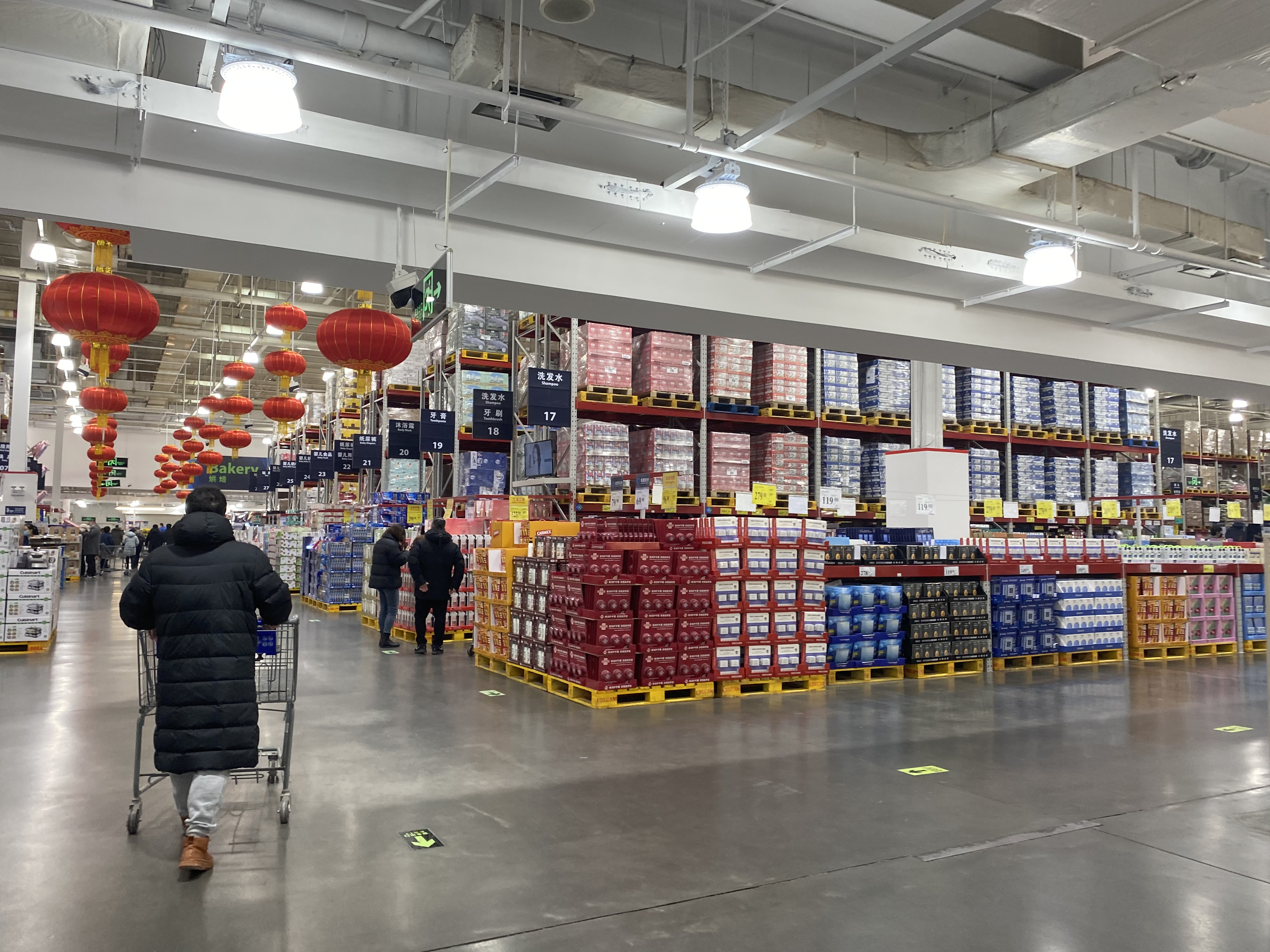
Shelves at a Sam's Club store in Beijing, China

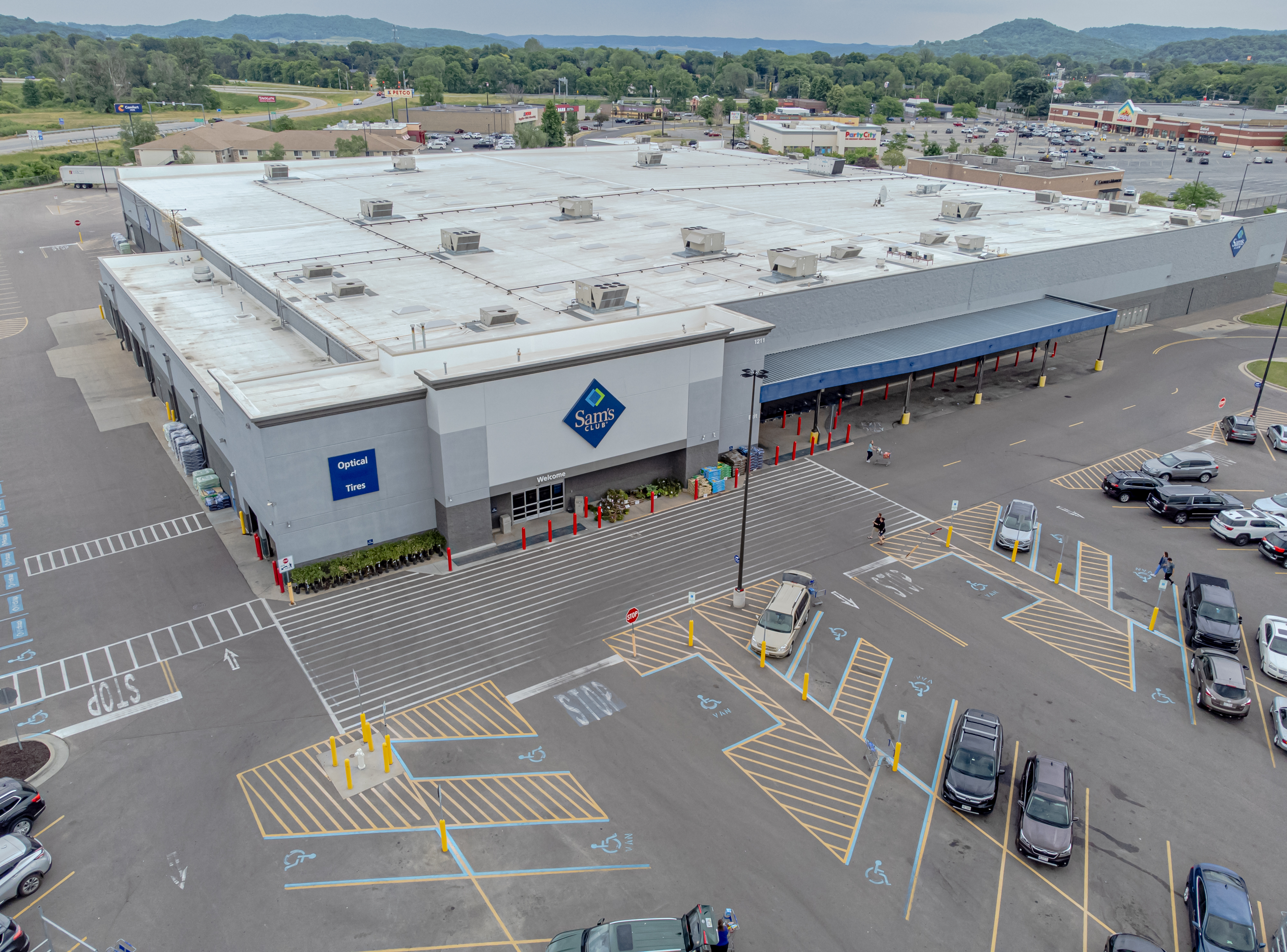
Aerial view of a Sam's Club store in Onalaska, Wisconsin, United States

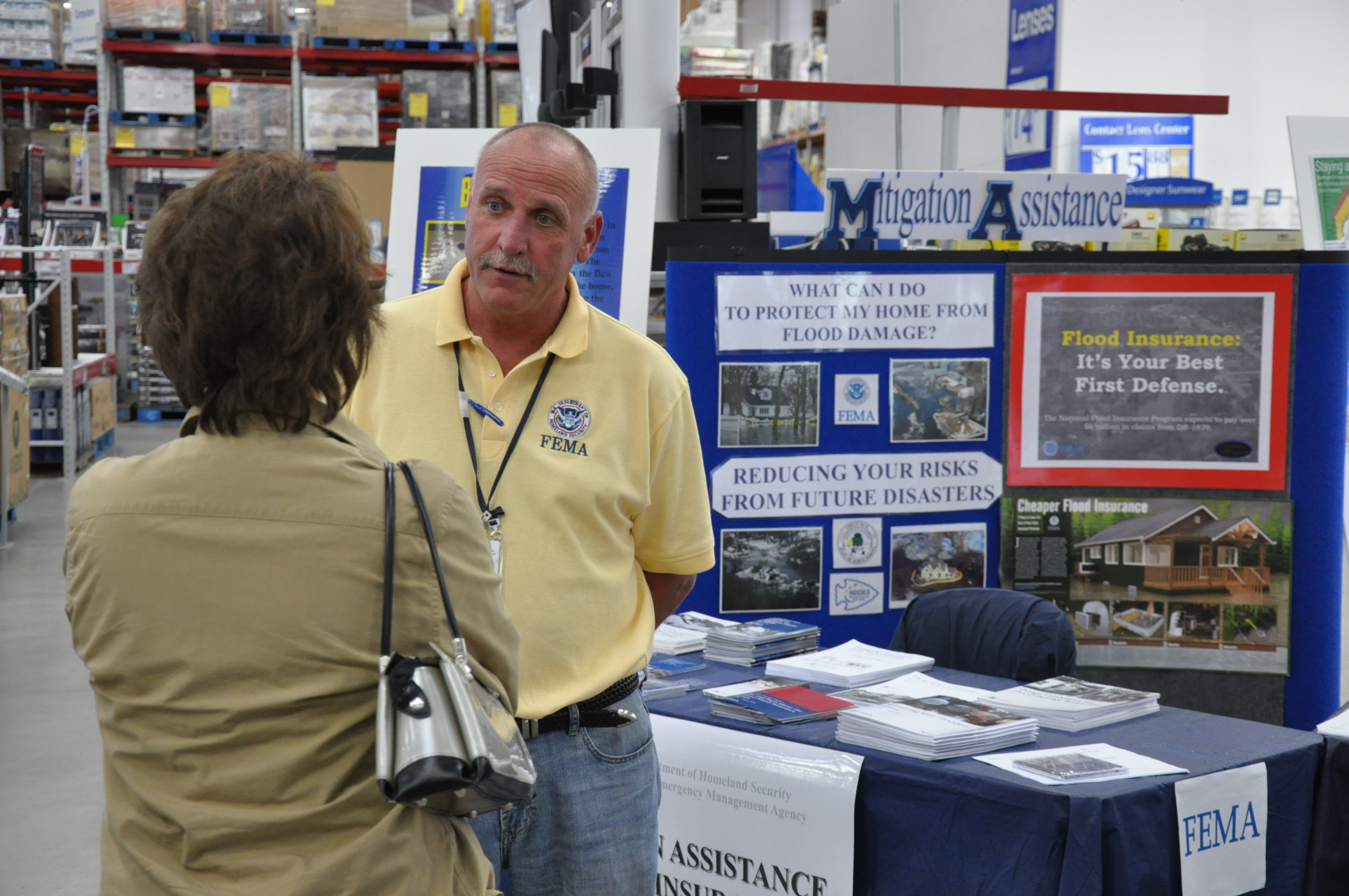
A mitigation advisor speaks to a woman at a Sam's Club store in Bismarck, North Dakota, United States

== Other retail formats ==
In Houston, Sam's Club opened Más Club in August 2009, a club geared towards the Hispanic population. Membership in Más Club was separate from membership in Sam's Club. The store eventually began a liquidation sale in December 2013, and was closed in February 2014.

In October 2018, Sam's Club opened Sam's Club Now, a "mobile-first" retail store where customers use the Sam's Club Now mobile app to scan and pay for merchandise. Customers can also order items ahead of time with same-day curbside pickup at the store. The Sam's Club Now store is located in Dallas, TX.

== Controversy and incidents ==
In March 2020, a Sam's Club store in Midland, Texas, was the site of a violent stabbing that wounded three Asian family members, including two young children. The suspect, a 19-year-old, allegedly believed the Chinese were responsible for the COVID-19 pandemic.

In December 2021, Sam's Club took a number of Xinjiang-produced goods off the shelves, claiming an inventory issue. China's Central Commission for Discipline Inspection called the removal of goods "malicious", claiming that it "exposes their stupidity and shortsightedness" and that Sam's Club "will surely suffer the consequences". The removal sparked public outcry and boycott in China. A number of Chinese consumers cancelled or suspended their membership cards.
