= Lee Scott (businessman) =

American businessman (born 1949)

- Born: Harold Lee Scott Jr. March 14, 1949 (age 77); Baxter Springs, Kansas; United States
- Education: Pittsburg State University (BS)
- Occupation: Businessman
- Employer: Wal-Mart Stores, Inc.
- Predecessor: David Glass
- Successor: Mike Duke
- Board member of: Wal-Mart

Harold Lee Scott Jr. is an American businessman who was the third chief executive officer of Wal-Mart Stores, Inc., from January 2000 to January 2009. Scott joined Walmart in 1979 and under his leadership, the company retained its position as the largest retailer in the world based on revenue, although the company faced growing criticism during his tenure for its environmental footprint, labor practices, and economic impact. Scott has been a board member of Walmart since 1999, and was chairman of the executive committee of the retailer's board of directors.

Scott was born and raised in Baxter Springs, Kansas and graduated with a Bachelor of Science degree in business from Pittsburg State University. He is married to Linda G. Scott and has two children. Scott was named to the Time magazine list of the hundred "most influential people" in both 2004 and 2005. In 2019, Scott was inducted into the Kansas Business Hall of Fame.

Business positions
Preceded by David Glass	President and CEO of Walmart; 2000–2009	Succeeded by Mike Duke
