= Rosalind Brewer =

American business executive and chemist

Roz Brewer

President of Spelman College
- Acting
- In office October 18, 2024 – August 1, 2026
- Preceded by: Helene D. Gayle

Personal details
- Born: 1962 (age 63–64) Detroit, Michigan, U.S.
- Spouse: John Brewer
- Children: 2
- Education: Spelman College (BS)

Rosalind G. Brewer (born 1962) is an American businesswoman and former CEO of Walgreens Boots Alliance, before stepping down in September 2023. Brewer is the first woman to become CEO of Walgreens Boots Alliance, group president and COO of Starbucks, and CEO of Sam's Club. She served as the interim president of Spelman College, and as a member of the President's Export Council.

USA Today referred to her as "one of corporate America's most prominent women and black female executives." Brewer has been called a "Highly Powerful Woman" by Forbes and Fortune magazines.

== Early life and education ==
Rosalind Brewer was born in 1962 in Detroit, Michigan, the youngest of five children; they were the first generation in her family to attend college. Due to her inclination for math and science, Brewer was interested in pursuing a career as a physician.

In 1980, upon graduating from Cass Technical High School in Detroit, Brewer enrolled at Spelman College in Atlanta, Georgia where she completed her bachelor's degree in chemistry. She decided not to pursue a career in medicine, and began working at Kimberly-Clark as a research technician.

Brewer completed the director's college (executive education) program at the University of Chicago Booth School of Business and Stanford Law School, as well as the advanced management program at The Wharton School, University of Pennsylvania.

== Career ==
Brewer has held executive positions at Kimberly-Clark, Walmart, Sam's Club, Starbucks, and Walgreens Boots Alliance. Additionally, in 2019 Brewer was elected and became the only black member of the board of directors at Amazon. She has been a non-executive director at Lockheed Martin and Molson Coors Brewing Company. Brewer continues to serve as a member on the board of trustees for Westminster School, the board of councilors for the Carter Presidential Center, and board of trustees chair at Spelman College. in 2024 she became a limited partner in the Atlanta Falcons ownership group.

=== Kimberly-Clark (1984-2006) ===
In 1984, after graduating from Spelman College, Brewer began her career as a research technician at Kimberly-Clark, a global paper-based product company, till 1988. From 1988 to 1998, she held numerous leadership roles including market manager, and director for Skincare. Between 1998 and 2006, Brewer served as the vice president of Kimberly-Clark's Nonwovens division. Brewer had a 22-year career at Kimberly-Clark Corporation.

=== Walmart and Sam's Club (2006-2017) ===
Brewer's career with Walmart began in 2006. Brewer served as the vice president, senior vice president, executive vice president for southeastern operations, and executive vice president for the eastern business unit at Walmart stores. Brewer started her position as regional vice president of operations in Georgia. Following her work as the regional vice president of Operations in Georgia, she became the division president of Walmart's southeast market, and finally the president of Walmart East.

In 2012, Brewer left Walmart and became the president and CEO of Sam's Club, the membership-only retail warehouse clubs owned and operated by Walmart. She focused on health and wellness by doubling the number of organic products offered at Sam's Clubs. As CEO of Sam's Club, Brewer became the first black person to lead a Walmart division. She retired from her role at Sam's Club in 2017.

=== Starbucks (2017-2021) ===
On February 1, 2017, Brewer was nominated for the Starbucks board of directors. On September 6, 2017, was named COO and group president. Brewer was the second-highest-ranking executive at Starbucks after CEO Kevin Johnson and the first black and the first woman to become the COO and group president of Starbucks. She led businesses and operations in the United States, Canada, and Latin America.

=== Walgreens Boots Alliance (2021-2023) ===
On March 15, 2021, Rosalind Brewer was appointed as the CEO of Walgreens Boots Alliance. Brewer became the only black woman to lead a Fortune 500 company during that timeframe.

In 2023, Brewer's total compensation from Walgreens Boots Alliance was $14.1 million, or 407 times the median employee pay at Walgreens Boots Alliance for that year.

In September 2023, Brewer agreed to step down as CEO in September 2023 after being in the role for two years. Under Brewer's tenure as CEO, the company's stock declined 47%.

=== Board memberships ===
Brewer was a member of the board of directors at Amazon from 2019 to 2021. She was a director of Lockheed Martin from 2011 to 2017, and Molson Coors Brewing Company from 2006 to 2011.

== Honors ==
In 2020, Fortune ranked Brewer the 27th Most Powerful Woman in the World and Forbes ranked her 48th in their World's 100 Most Powerful Women.

On September 15, 2015, Fortune included Brewer in its Most Powerful Woman rankings. Working Mother named her one of the Most Powerful Working Moms of 2013.

In 2017, Brewer received the Spelman College Legacy of Leadership award.

Brewer was selected for the inaugural 2021 Forbes 50 Over 50 list of entrepreneurs, leaders, scientists and creators over the age of 50. The same year, she was also inducted into the Michigan Women's Hall of Fame.

Brewer was named as one of USA Today's Women of the Year in 2022.

== Personal life ==
Brewer is married to John Brewer, and they have two children.

== Advocacy for diversity and inclusion ==
In 2015, as CEO of Sam's Club, Brewer was interviewed on CNN by Poppy Harlow. During the interview, Brewer explained that diversity was a priority for her. When speaking about the topic, she said, "I demand it of my team" and that, "Every now and then you have to nudge your partners. You have to speak up and speak out. And I try to use my platform for that. I try to set an example." Brewer described a specific incident when she was meeting with a supplier, and she recollected, "the entire other side of the table was all Caucasian male. That was interesting." Brewer chose not to address the lack of diversity when meeting with the group, but said she was "going to make a call" to the supplier. In response to her comments, Brewer faced repercussions, as many individuals on social media called her "racist."

In support of Brewer's statement, Doug McMillon, Walmart's president and CEO, subsequently wrote in a statement, "For years, we've asked our suppliers to prioritize the talent and diversity of their sales teams calling on our company, Roz was simply trying to reiterate that we believe diverse and inclusive teams make for a stronger business. That's all there is to it and I support that important ideal."

Shortly after becoming the COO and group president of Starbucks, the company was met with nationwide protests and negative publicity because of the arrest of two black men at a Philadelphia store location. In response, Brewer and her team implemented policy changes and instituted racial bias training for employees in 8,000 stores.
