= Doug McMillon =

American businessman (born 1966)

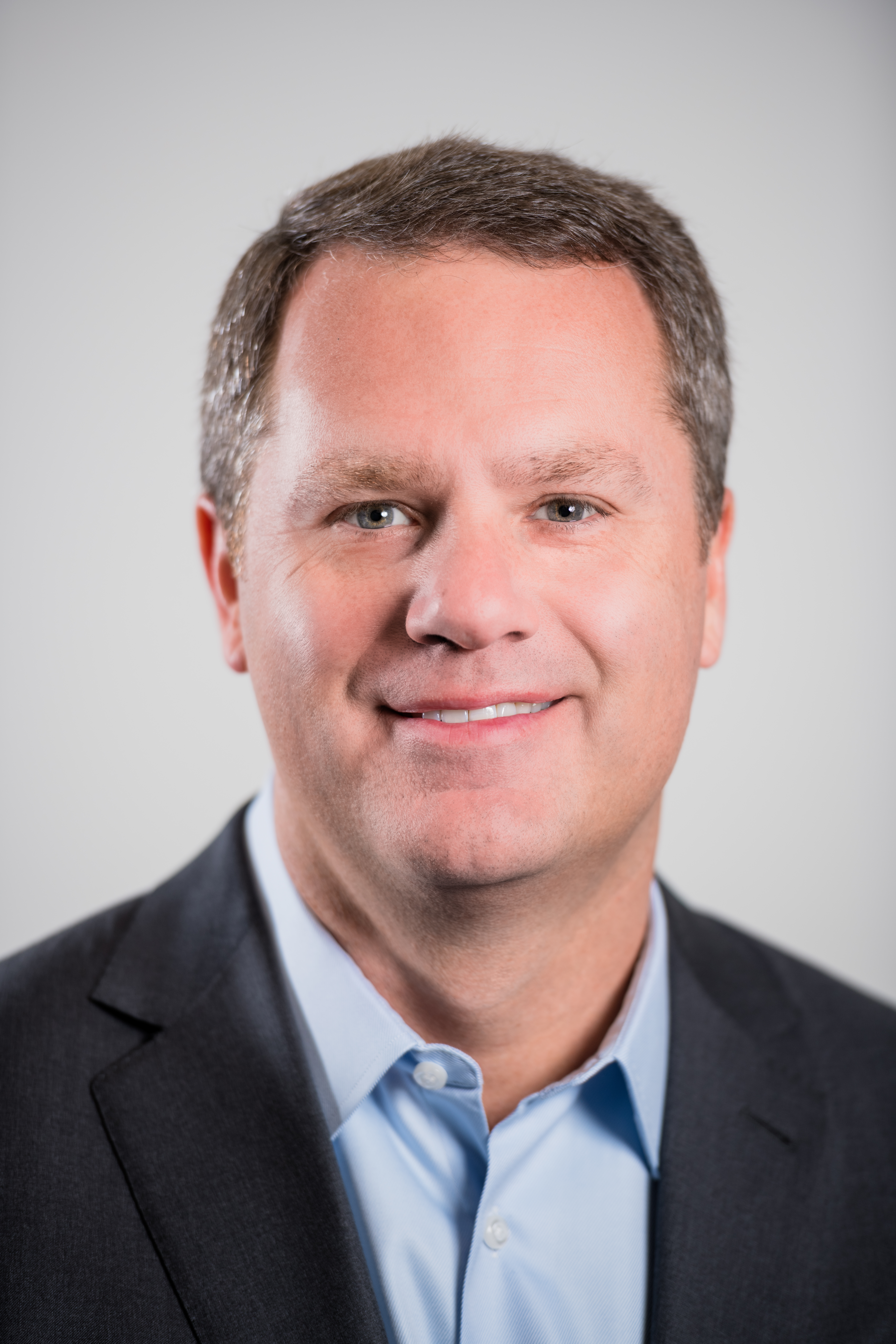
- McMillon in 2019

President and CEO, Walmart, Inc.
- In office February 2014 – January 2026
- Preceded by: Mike Duke
- Succeeded by: John Furner

President and CEO, Walmart International
- In office 2009–2013

President and CEO, Sam's Club
- In office 2005–2009

Personal details
- Born: Carl Douglas McMillon; October 17, 1966 (age 59) Memphis, Tennessee, U.S.
- Spouse: Shelley McMillon
- Children: 2
- Education: University of Arkansas (BSBA); University of Tulsa (MBA)
- Website: Official website

Carl Douglas McMillon (born October 17, 1966) is an American businessman who was the president and chief executive officer (CEO) of Walmart from 2014 to 2026 when he retired. He also sits on the retailer's board of directors. McMillon first joined the company as a summer associate in high school, and led the company's Sam's Club division, from 2005 to 2009, and Walmart International, from 2009 to 2013.

== Early life ==
McMillon was born in Memphis, Tennessee, and grew up in Jonesboro, Arkansas, the eldest of three children born to Laura and Morris McMillon, a dentist who served in Vietnam. His parents moved the family to Bentonville, Arkansas, the home of Walmart's headquarters, when McMillon was 16. A sports enthusiast, McMillon played point guard on the Bentonville High School basketball team.

== Career ==
McMillon has worked for Walmart throughout his career. He took on his first role with the company as a teenager in 1984. He later became a buyer, then moved into management roles before becoming CEO in 2014.

=== Early career ===
When he was a teenager, McMillon began his first job with Walmart as a summer associate. He worked during the summer unloading trucks in a distribution center. After high school, McMillon attended University of Arkansas, where he graduated with a Bachelor of Science in Business Administration in accounting in 1989.

The next year, as McMillon studied for a Master of Business Administration (MBA) from University of Tulsa, he called Walmart and told an executive he was interested in training to become a buyer when he completed his studies. Soon thereafter, McMillon rejoined Walmart as an assistant manager at a Tulsa, Oklahoma, store. After completing his MBA in 1991, McMillon moved to Walmart's Bentonville headquarters to join the buyer-training program. Originally in charge of buying fishing tackle, he later took on various roles as a buyer and a merchandiser, dealing in food, clothes, crafts and furnishings. He later worked as a general merchandise manager for Walmart's wholesale store division Sam's Club before taking an executive role at Walmart, overseeing toys, electronics, and sporting goods, among other areas.

=== Sam's Club (2005–2009) ===
Walmart promoted McMillon to president and CEO of Sam's Club on August 4, 2005. Under McMillon, the wholesaler emphasized marketing to small business customers. Additionally, McMillon incorporated what The Wall Street Journal called "treasure hunt" items that are limited-selection expensive premium items, such as diamond necklaces and wine vacations, for sale next to cheap bulk goods in an attempt to compete with Costco.

=== Walmart International (2009–2013) ===
Walmart officials moved McMillon from his role at Sam's Club to lead Walmart's international division in February 2009, replacing Mike Duke, who was promoted to CEO of Walmart Stores, Inc. Under McMillon, Walmart International focused on improving in existing markets, such as Canada, China, United Kingdom and the Americas. One area of particular importance to McMillon was integrating Walmart's "everyday low prices" model to these international markets. Under McMillon, the international division acquired a majority stake in South Africa's Massmart Holdings Ltd. for US$2.4 billion.

During McMillon's tenure, Walmart International's sales growth outpaced Walmart US and grew to 29 percent of total sales company-wide. When McMillon first became head of the division, it comprised more than 3,300 stores in 14 countries. When Walmart announced it would move him to head Walmart Stores, Inc. in late 2013, Walmart International operated 6,300 stores in 26 countries.

=== CEO of Walmart, Inc. (2014–2026) ===
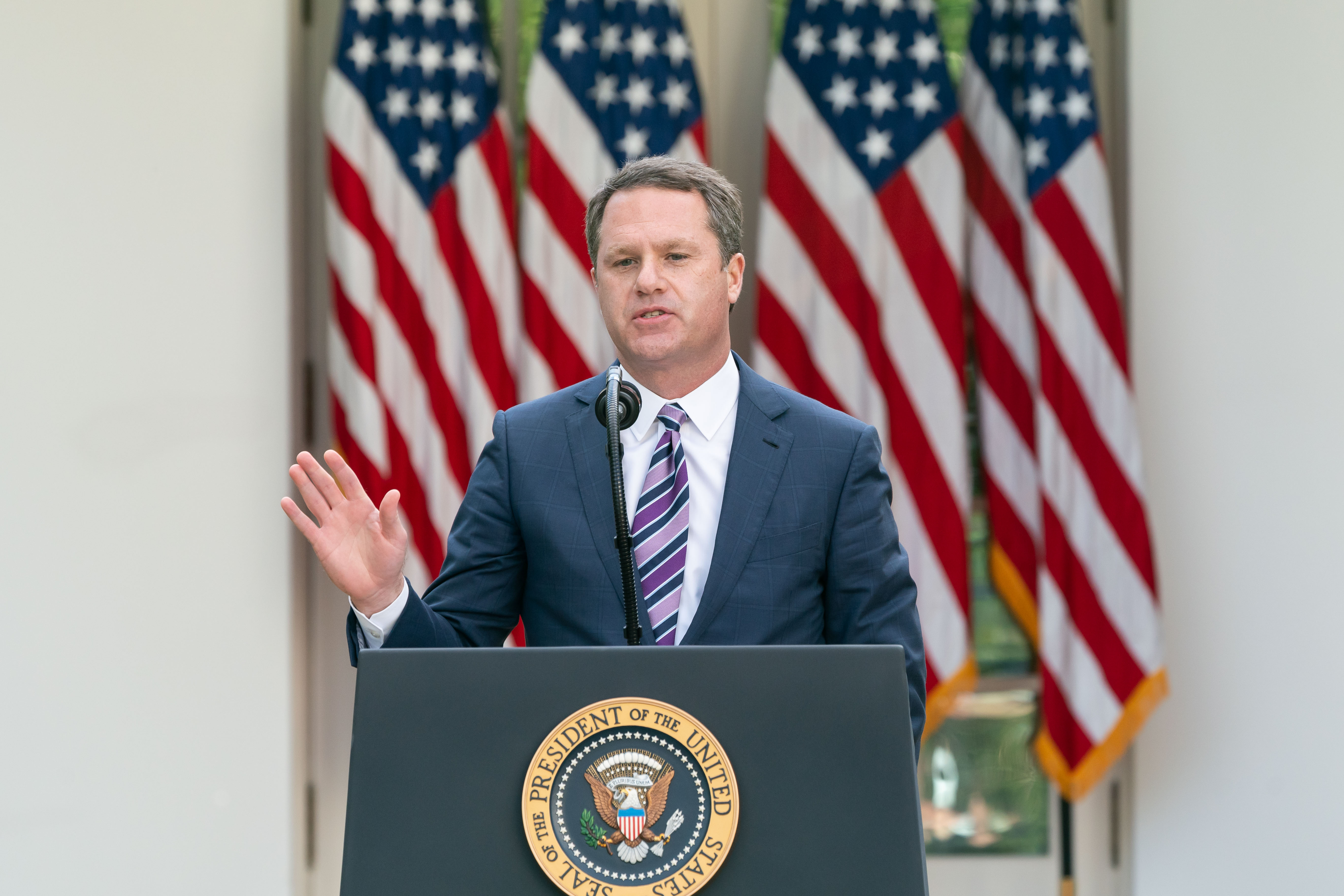
McMillon speaks from the White House Rose Garden on the COVID-19 pandemic in April 2020

Walmart announced on November 25, 2013, that McMillon would immediately join the company's board of directors, and would replace Mike Duke as Walmart CEO effective on February 1, 2014, becoming the company's fifth chief executive.

McMillon took over the company at a time of slowing growth and increased competition from rivals, such as Costco, Amazon.com, grocery store chains Kroger and Safeway, and discount chains of small stores like Family Dollar and Dollar General. Within his first two years as chief executive, McMillon raised wages for hourly workers in the US, boosted the company's commitment to e-commerce and revamped Walmart's executive team. While increased spending on labor and Walmart's digital offerings lowered short-term profits, McMillon argued that the moves would lead to happier workers and better customer service, as well as a better footing in a changing retail market.

In February 2015, McMillon announced Walmart would invest an additional US$2.7 billion in higher associate wages, benefits and training, including raising its lowest wage to US$9 an hour in 2015 and US$10 an hour for 2016. The action affected 40 percent of the company's 1.4 million US workers. In January 2016, McMillon announced raises for the majority of its workers, free basic short-term disability for full-time workers and a revised paid time off program.

McMillon made it a long-term goal of Walmart to increase investments in e-commerce, stressing a need to create a "seamless shopping experience". As such he announced in 2015 that Walmart would invest US$1 billion on its online operations. Another goal is to improve the company's environmental sustainability and eliminate waste across the company. In 2014, Walmart began rolling out an initiative to replace lighting in its stores in the US, UK, Latin America and Asia with LED lights for energy efficiency. At the Davos World Economic Forum in January 2016, McMillon said Walmart would press three of its main goals: supply the company with renewable energy, eliminate waste and promote sustainably packaged goods.

As CEO, McMillon sought to make a "positive difference" in other issues. On March 31, 2015, McMillon issued a statement urging Arkansas Gov. Asa Hutchinson to veto the state's "religious freedom" bill. McMillon said the bill "threatens to undermine the spirit of inclusion present throughout the state of Arkansas and does not reflect the values we proudly uphold".

In June 2015, McMillon said the company would stop selling Confederate flag merchandise following the shooting of nine black churchgoers in Charleston, South Carolina. McMillon altered Walmart's gun sales. He told CNNMoney in an interview that Walmart's selection of firearms should be geared towards hunters and sports shooters. In August 2015, the company ceased sales of military-style semiautomatic weapons.

Forbes named McMillon to its World's Most Powerful People list in 2014, 2015 and 2016 where he ranked No. 29, No. 32, No. 27 respectively. ExecRank ranked McMillon No. 4 on its 2015 list of top CEOs for large companies.

In December 2016, McMillon joined a business forum assembled by then president-elect Donald Trump to provide strategic and policy advice on economic issues. In August 2017, McMillon wrote a rebuke of President Trump's response to the violent protests, despite Trump's condemnation of alt-right protestors in Charlottesville, Virginia in an email to all employees and on the internal company website viewable by the public. The statement said that Trump, "missed a critical opportunity to help bring our country together". A company spokesman said McMillon would continue to serve on a presidential advisory council on economic development.

In September 2019, McMillon announced that the company would no longer sell ammunition used for handguns and military-style weapons. This policy update came as a result of the mass shooting which took place at a Walmart in El Paso, Texas in August 2019. McMillon's actions to create a dialogue and take actions around the issue, set a new precedent for how corporations and their leaders address these matters.

In 2023, McMillon's total compensation from Walmart was $27 million, or 976 times the median Walmart employee pay for that year.

In November 2025, Walmart announced McMillon would retire as CEO in January 2026 after almost 12 years as CEO and over 40 years with the company. At the time of the announcement, McMillon had overseen a 400%+ rise in Walmart shares, equating to more than $576 billion in market capitalization.

== Personal life ==
McMillon lives with his wife, Shelley, in Bentonville, Arkansas. They have two sons.

Business positions
Preceded by Mike Duke	President of Walmart; 2013–2025	Incumbent
