= Mike Duke =

Ex-CEO of Walmart

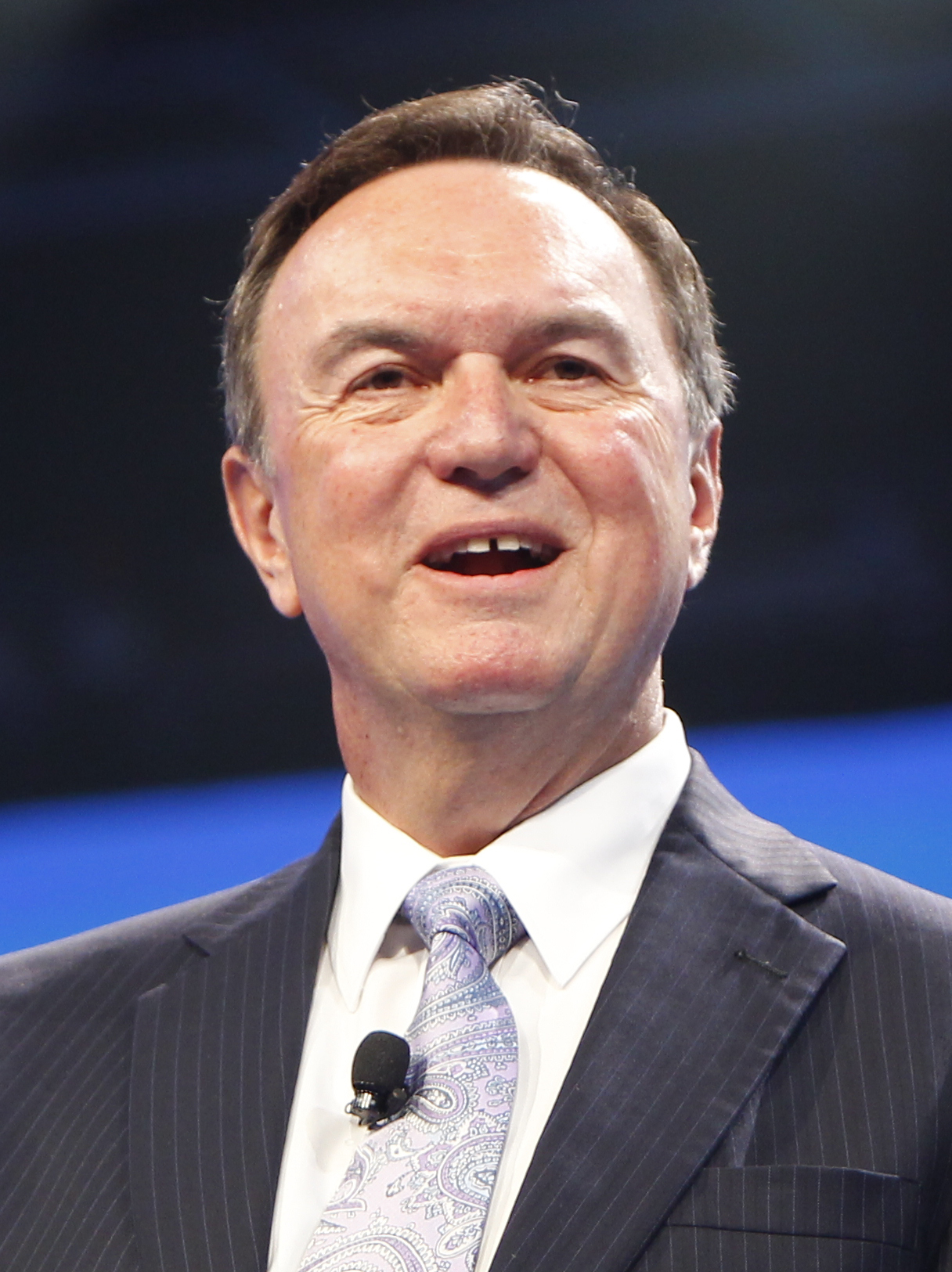
- Duke in 2011
- Born: Michael Terry Duke; December 7, 1949 (age 76)
- Education: Georgia Tech (BS)
- Employer: Walmart
- Board member of: Consumer Goods Forum

Michael Terry Duke (born December 7, 1949) is an American businessman. He served as the fourth chief executive officer of Walmart from 2009 to 2014.

Duke was elected a member of the National Academy of Engineering (2010) for leadership and contributions to the design and implementation of innovative logistics and retail technologies.

== Biography ==
Duke joined Walmart in 1995, serving as the executive in charge of the company's international operations. He became the CEO of Walmart in February 2009, succeeding Lee Scott.

Duke also serves on the board of directors for the Retail Industry Leaders Association and Arvest Bank's community advisory board. He formerly held positions with a number of retailers, including Federated Department Stores, May Department Stores, and Venture Stores. Duke earned a BS in Industrial Engineering from the Georgia Institute of Technology in 1971, where he joined the Delta Sigma Phi fraternity, and in 2009 served as a member of the institution's advisory board. As of 2012 he sat on the board of directors of the Consumer Goods Forum.

In 2010 he set goals to make Walmart energy efficient as possible and to open Walmart stores in countries like Russia. In 2012, his salary was $18.2 million.

Duke ranked No. 10 on Forbes list of The World's Most Powerful People in 2013. That same year, Walmart ranked No. 15 on Forbes list of Most Patriotic Brands—and the only retailer on the list—as voted by U.S. consumers. As of November 25, 2013, Duke's tenure as CEO ended with his sudden replacement decided by Walmart's Board. Press reports indicated that the total value of Duke's pension, deferred compensation and other retirement accounts totaled over $113 million.

Duke said in 2012 that his biggest regret as CEO was not investing more in e-commerce to better compete with Amazon. "I wish we had moved faster. We've proven ourselves to be successful in many areas, and I simply wonder why we didn't move more quickly. This is especially true for e-commerce," Duke said at the time. "Right now we're making tremendous progress, and the business is moving, but we should have moved faster to expand this area."

Business positions
Preceded by Lee Scott	President of Wal-Mart; 2009–2013	Succeeded by Doug McMillon
