= Costco hot dog =

Food product sold at Costco

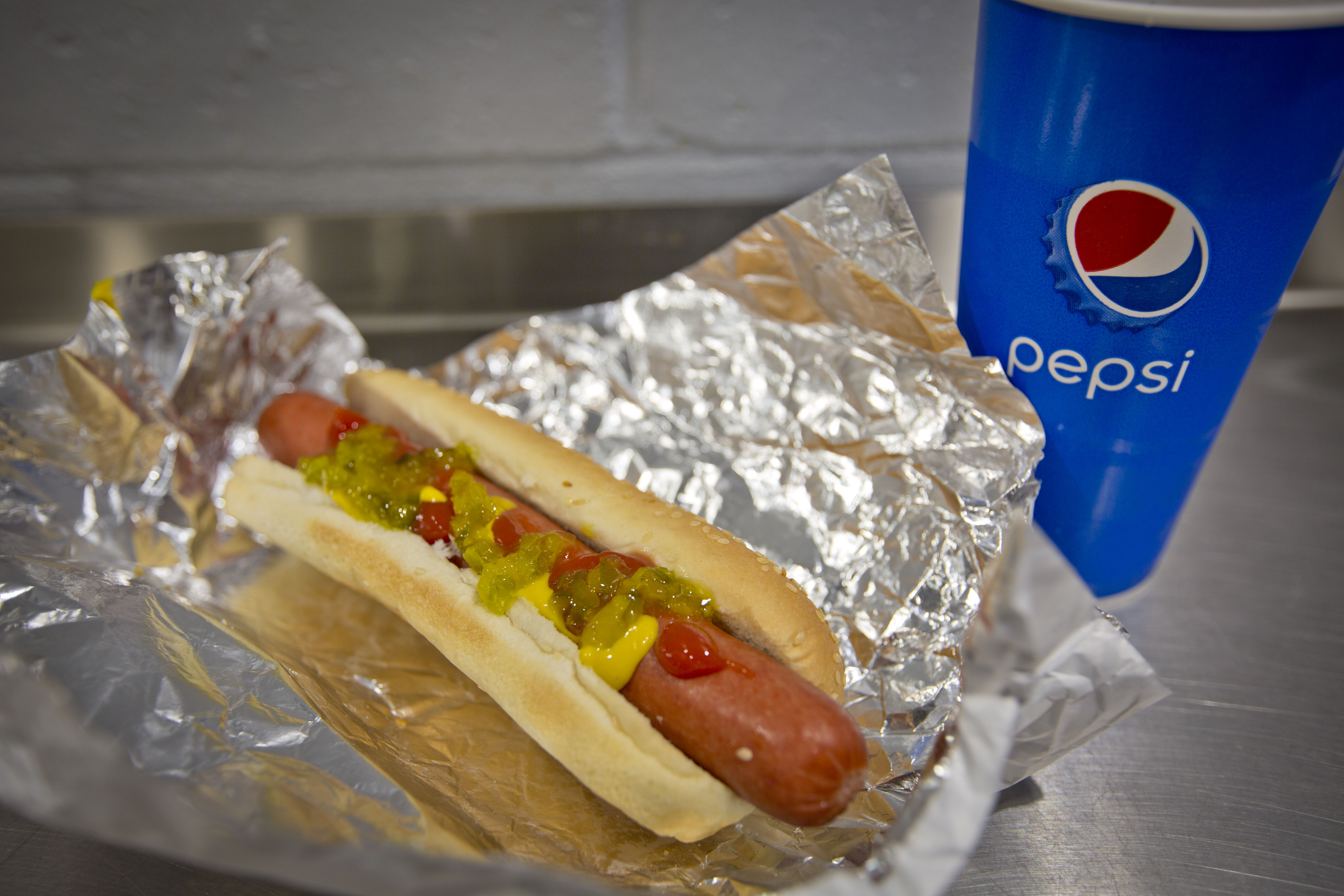
A hot dog and drink combo at Costco

The Costco hot dog is a 1/4-pound (110-gram) hot dog sold at the international warehouse club Costco's food courts. It is notable for its steady price as a combo deal with a soda at North American locations since its introduction in 1984.

== History ==
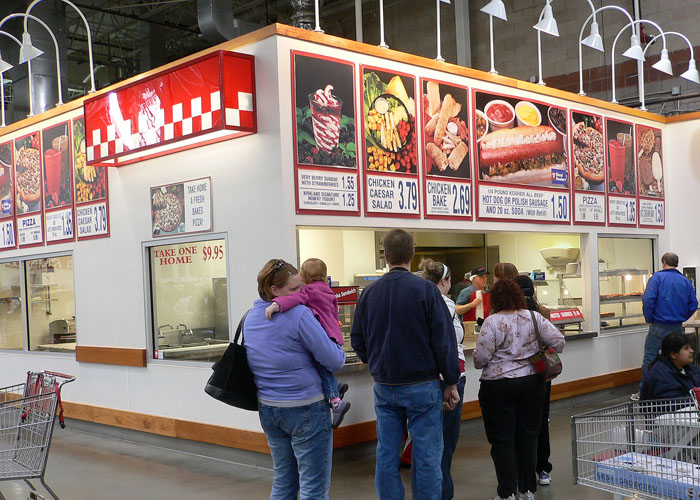
A Costco food court menu, featuring the hot dog and soda combo deal sign

The Costco hot dog was introduced to food courts in 1984, one year after Costco's opening in 1983. The original hot dog was made by Hebrew National, and was sold at a hot dog cart outside a Costco location in San Diego. As of 2018, Costco sold a yearly average of 135 million hot dogs, more than every Major League Baseball stadium combined. In November 2022, Sam's Club, a Costco competitor, reduced the price of its hot dog and soda combo deal to $1.38 in an attempt to compete with the Costco hot dog.

== The combo deal ==
The product varies across countries; the U.S. version consists of a Kirkland brand wiener, some warehouses selling it with a sesame bun, some selling it with a plain bun. It is sold as part of a combo deal with a 20 U.S. fl oz (590 mL) soda. The soda fountains at the Costco food courts were stocked with Coca-Cola products until 2013, when Costco switched to Pepsi products as a cost savings measure for the combo. In January 2025, Costco CEO Ron Vachris confirmed that they will revert to Coca-Cola products in early 2025, a process completed throughout every club by the end of the summer. In April 2026, Costco announced that they would begin offering a 16.9 fl oz bottle of Kirkland Signature bottled water as a drink option for the combo deal alongside the original fountain drink.

In 2008, Costco began using its own hot dog factories, reducing supply chain costs. A Costco meat processing facility in Tracy, California, that had been around since 2004 began producing hot dogs in 2011, and produced both the hot dogs sold in the food court as well as smaller hot dogs sold in packs. The switch also ushered in the usage of non-kosher beef. Another facility was opened in Morris, Illinois in 2018.

== Price ==
The price was set at $1.50 at its introduction and has remained at $1.50 ever since. As of 2024, the hot dog combo would cost approximately $4.40 if the price were adjusted to match inflation since 1984. In 2022, Costco CFO Richard Galanti stated that Costco intends to keep the combo deal's price constant "forever." Galanti's replacement Gary Millerchip stated in May 2024 that the price is "safe."

Costco hot dog price comparison among countries (exchange rate accurate as of Feb 2026)
Country	Meat	Price	Price converted to USD	Source
Australia	Pork	A$1.99	$1.42	
Canada	Beef	C$1.50	$1.10	
China	Pork	¥10.9	$1.58	
France	Beef	€1.50	$1.74	
Japan	Pork	¥180 (8%) ¥184 (10%) (Note: In Japan, taking out charges 8% consumption tax while eating in charges 10%.)	$1.18(8%) $1.20 (10%)	
Mexico	Beef	MX$30	$1.75	
New Zealand	Pork	NZ$1.99	$1.20	
South Korea	Pork	₩2,000	$1.39	
Sweden	Beef	20kr	$2.02	
Taiwan	Pork	NT$50	$1.59	
United Kingdom	Beef	£1.50	$2.04	
United States	Beef	$1.50	$1.50	

== Cultural impact ==
The hot dog and soda combo deal has developed a cult following. Several t-shirt designs are sold online that celebrate the food court sign advertising the combo. In 2009, the Seattle Times asked Costco co-founder (and then-CEO) Jim Sinegal, "If [the price of the hot dog] ever goes up, what will it mean?" Sinegal replied, "That I'm dead."

Craig Jelinek, Sinegal's successor as CEO, revealed in 2018 that he approached Sinegal in 2013 about raising the price of the hot dog combo to $1.75 (equivalent to $2.40 in 2025), saying, "Jim, we can't [continue to] sell this hot dog for a buck fifty. We are losing our rear ends." According to Jelinek, Sinegal replied, "If you raise [the price of] the effing hot dog, I will kill you. Figure it out." Instead of raising the price, Jelinek instead decided to switch from Coca-Cola products to Pepsi products to keep the combo at $1.50. According to Premier Media Group, the publisher of that story, it was the single most viral story run to date by the company as of 2024.

In 2024, Ron Vachris, Jelinek's successor, was reminded in an interview about Sinegal's now-famous quote about raising the price of the Costco hot dog. Vachris reiterated how Costco has gone to "great lengths" to maintain the prices of its hot dog combo and rotisserie chicken, and promised that raising those prices would not happen on his watch.

== Analysis ==
Several explanations exist as to why Costco chooses to continue to sell its hot dog combo at an unusually low price point. When asked why the price of the hot dog was significant to him, Jim Sinegal said, "Because everybody talks about it. People look at that hot dog and say a buck fifty, this is unbelievable." He continued, "We're known for that hot dog. That's something you don't mess with."

According to David Fuller, assistant vice president of publishing, "Costco wanted to prove that a business can operate on a fair markup and still pay all of its bills. Holding a price that steady for that long sends a clear message about what is possible when you decide to operate your business model on a 'cost plus' basis instead of a 'what the market will bear' basis." Costco vice-president Bob Nelson stated that "It epitomizes the value that we stand for."

Some commentators and employees have called the hot dog a loss leader, drawing in enough customers to compensate for lost profits. Costco CFO Richard Galanti did not directly confirm or deny this theory, but commented that "Needless to say we aren't making a lot or any" profit on food court products.

== See also ==
- Fixed price of Coca-Cola from 1886 to 1959 – $0.05 price of Coca-Cola
