= Loss leader =

Product sold below cost to stimulate other, more profitable sales

A loss leader (also leader) is a product sold at a price below its minimum profit margin to stimulate other sales of more profitable goods or services. The use of a loss leader is a pricing strategy, a sales promotion strategy, and a marketing strategy. The loss leader is offered at a price below its minimum profit margin, not necessarily below cost.

One use of a loss leader is to draw customers into a store where they are likely to buy other goods. The vendor expects that the typical customer will purchase other goods at the same time as the loss leader and that the profit made on these goods will be such that an overall profit is generated for the vendor. The vendor tries to maintain a current analysis of its accounts for both the loss leader and the associated goods, so it can monitor how well the scheme is doing to avoid an overall net loss.

It is called a leader because it is intended to lead to the subsequent sale of other goods or services.

== Strategy ==
Marketing academics have shown that retailers should think of both the direct and indirect effect of substantial price promotions when evaluating their impact on profit. To make a very precise analysis one should also include effects over time. Deep price promotions may cause people to bulk-buy (stockpile), which may invalidate the long-term effect of the strategy. This is the association rule analysis.

When automobile dealerships in the United States use this practice, they offer at least one vehicle below cost and must disclose all of the features of the vehicle (including the VIN). If the loss-leader vehicle has been sold, the salesperson tries to sell a more upscale trim of that vehicle at a slightly discounted price, as a customer who has missed the loss-leading vehicle is unlikely to find a better deal elsewhere.

Loss leaders can be an important part of companies' marketing and sales strategies, especially during "dumping" campaigns.

=== Characteristics ===
- A loss leader may be placed in an inconvenient part of the store, such as at the rear of the store, so that purchasers must walk past other goods that have higher profit margins.
- A loss leader is usually a product that customers purchase frequently—thus they are aware that its unusually low price is a bargain.
- Loss leaders are often scarce or provided with limits (e.g., maximum 10 bottles) to discourage stockpiling and to limit purchases by small businesses. The seller must use loss leaders regularly if they expect their customers to come back.
- Some loss leader items, such as fruits, vegetables and pastries, are perishable and cannot be easily stockpiled by customers.
- Some loss leaders, rather than being advertised as bargains, are high-end, costly products offered below profit margin to enhance the company's prestige and/or to attract "lookers" or "window shoppers" who may buy other less expensive but more profitable merchandise. For example, if a pawnshop offers a Harley-Davidson motorcycle in its display window at below the normal profit-making cost, this motorcycle will generate a lot of walk-in traffic during the period before it is sold. Another example would be a restaurant that has a surf and turf special at the top of the menu of the day, which entices customers. These shoppers may end up using the store's other services or making other purchases.

Some examples of typical loss leaders include milk, eggs, rice, and other inexpensive items that grocers would not want to sell without the customer making other purchases. While some customers may have the discipline to only buy the loss leaders, the loss leader strategy works because a customer who goes into a grocery store to buy an inexpensive bread or milk item may decide to buy other grocery items.

== Examples ==
=== Record albums ===
The Warner/Reprise Loss Leaders were a series of promotional sampler compilation albums released by Warner Bros. Records throughout the 1970s. Each album (usually a 2-record set) contained a wide variety of tracks by artists under contract to Warner Bros. and its subsidiary labels (primarily Reprise Records); often these were singles, B-sides, non-hit album tracks, or otherwise obscure material, all designed to arouse interest in the artists' regular albums. Warner advertised the Loss Leaders albums by inserting special illustrated inner sleeves in all of its regular album releases, listing all of the currently available Loss Leaders and including an order form. Each loss leader double album was priced at US$2, significantly less than a comparable regular-release double album of the time.

The first Loss Leaders compilation was The 1969 Warner/Reprise Songbook, featuring a wide range of artists from Miriam Makeba to The Mothers of Invention; the last of the original series was the punk and new wave-themed Troublemakers in 1980.

=== Video cassettes ===
In 1979, American businessman Earl Muntz decided to sell blank tapes and VCRs as loss leaders to attract customers to his showroom, where he would then try to sell them highly profitable widescreen projection TV systems of his own design. His success continued through the early 1980s.

=== Automobiles ===
On its launch in 1959 the British Motor Corporation's Mini car was sold at a starting price (including taxes) of £496 for its most basic model, and it was estimated that BMC lost £30 per car sold at this price. However, the headline-grabbing price was significantly lower than that of the car's contemporary rival, the Ford Anglia—indeed the only cheaper four-wheeled, four-seater car on the British car market at the time was the very basic and old-fashioned Ford Popular, which sold for only £2 less than the basic Mini. While BMC lost money on every basic Mini sold, such cars were unattractive to many buyers since they lacked features such as heaters, floor carpets and opening rear windows and BMC priced the better-equipped models (which cost from £537) to make a small profit, using the basic car as a loss-leader to allow the promotion of a starting price below the significant £500 mark and to make the Mini at least appear to undercut its main rival on price. The ploy did not work entirely as BMC intended—even in its most basic form, the Mini was far superior in many areas to its rivals while also being lower in price. BMC sold far more basic Minis than it had anticipated, meaning that it sold many Minis at a significant loss. Despite the car being a bestseller in Britain (and several other markets) it made little to no profit for many years.

=== Perishable food ===
Supermarkets sell food staples such as bananas or milk at less than the cost at which they were purchased in order to draw customers to their business. These items are typically strategically placed far from the entrances of the store to enhance this effect.

Costco sells its quarter-pound hotdog and soda combo for US$1.50, a price point that has not changed since 1985 and is believed to be well below cost, to bring customers into the store. It also sells its rotisserie chicken well below cost, at US$4.99. The US$1.50 price point is both famous and popular among Costco customers. For example, a 2018 Seattle business magazine story disclosing that co-founder and former CEO James Sinegal cursed out then-CEO W. Craig Jelinek in 2013 for merely thinking about raising the price of the Costco hot dog was the most viral story ever run by that publisher as of 2024.

Supermarkets in the UK including Tesco, Asda, Sainsburys and Morrisons have engaged in an annual loss leader price war for Christmas vegetables since discounters Aldi and Lidl gained market share. Christmas staple items such as carrots, cabbage and sprouts are priced as low as 8p per kilogram – well below the price the businesses pay to farmers and the usual RRP of around 70p. The tactic intends for customers to pick up the cheap vegetables and then do a full shop that includes highly profitable Christmas items such as desserts, Christmas crackers and decorations. There is some concern that this intense price war hurts farmers.

=== Diapers/nappies ===
Many toy store chains and online retailers sell diapers or nappies as a loss leader in order to entice parents into the store in the hopes that the children will spot toys, bottles or other items that the family desires.

=== Hardware/tool stores ===
Large hardware stores often sell larger tools, such as drills or electric saws at cost or below. They do this expecting customers to buy accessories such as blades, drill bits, stands, or cases, along with the new tool. These items tend to have a much higher profit margin, and are often impulse buys.

=== Smartphones and mobile electronics ===
Some consumer electronics stores use smartphones and other mobile electronics as loss leaders. The company makes less profit on smartphone or mobile devices, but it makes up for this through the sales of higher-profit accessories such as cases, headphones and power adapters.

=== Home video game consoles ===
Gaming consoles, such as the Xbox 360/PlayStation 3, Xbox One/PlayStation 4, or Xbox Series X/S/PlayStation 5, are often initially sold as loss leaders. This helps assert market share for the console, which enables the creation of a development ecosystem for games. The profit is then made on the sale of games and accessories over the system's lifetime.

=== Printers ===
Often, printers are sold at or below manufacturing cost, drawing consumers in through low prices. Manufacturers do so expecting the overwhelming majority of consumers to continue purchase OEM ink cartridges rather than opting for less reliable third-party products. Profit is then recovered through cartridge sales throughout the lifetime of the printer.

== See also ==
- Bait-and-switch
- Competition law
- Dumping (pricing policy)
- Freebie marketing
- Parallel importing
- Predatory pricing
- Pricing strategies
- Product bundling
- Razor and blades model
- Suicide bidding
- Tying (commerce)
- Vendor lock-in
