= Slotting =

Slotting may refer to:

- the location reserved or selected for storage of each item in a warehouse
- the location of products on retail shelves to promote sales in exchange for a slotting fee
