= Costco =

American multinational warehouse club chain

Costco Wholesale Corporation
- Logo since 1997

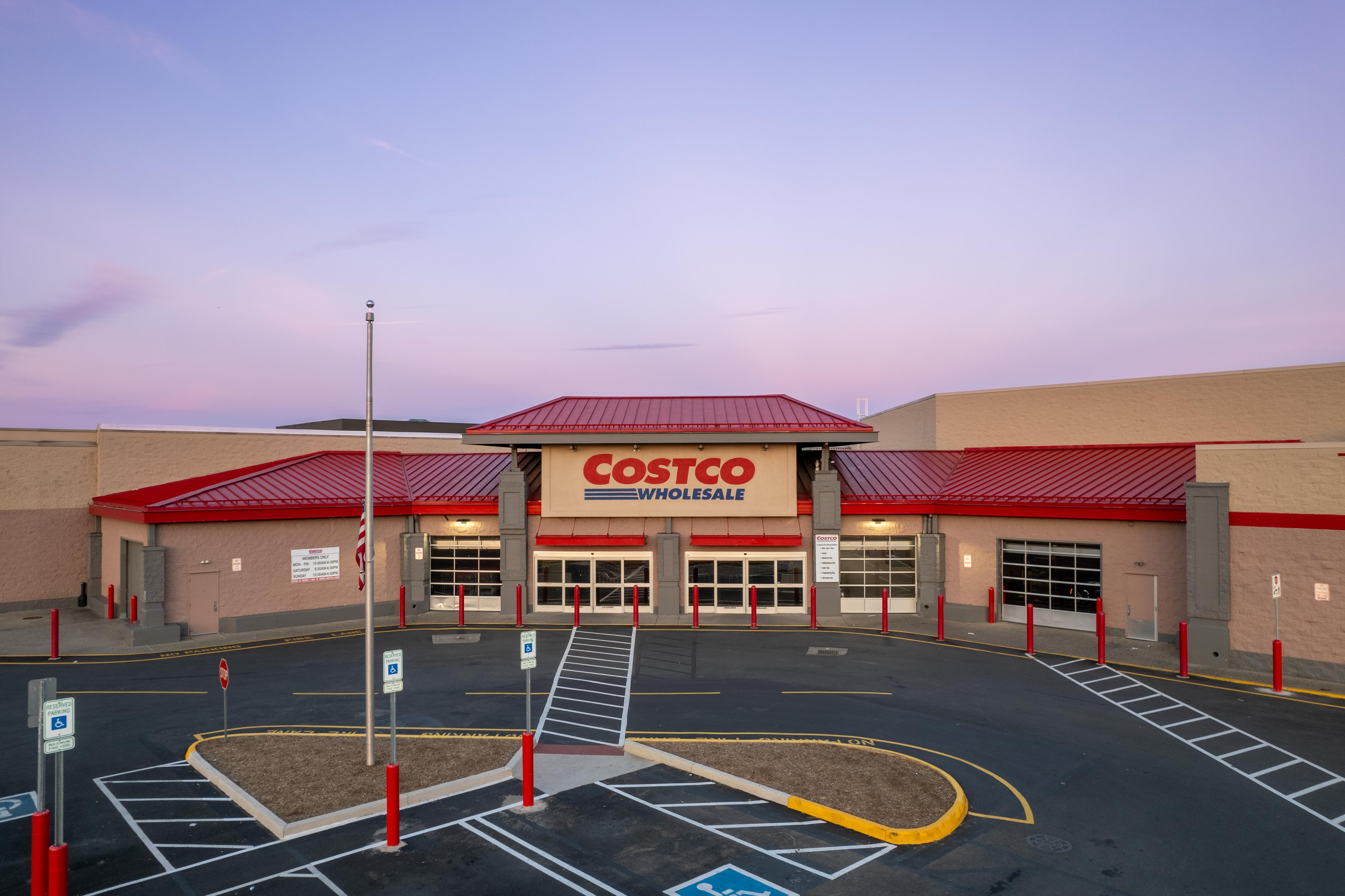
- Costco Wholesale #340 in Fredericksburg, Virginia, anchored at the Spotsylvania Towne Centre.
- Type: Public company
- Traded as: Nasdaq: COST; Nasdaq-100 component; S&P 100 component; S&P 500 component
- Industry: Retail
- Founded: September 15, 1983; 43 years ago in Seattle
- Founders: James Sinegal; Jeffrey Brotman
- Headquarters: Issaquah, Washington, United States
- Number of locations: 924 (2026)
- Area served: North America: United States; Canada; Mexico; Rest of the world: Australia; China; France; Iceland; Japan; New Zealand; South Korea; Spain; Sweden; Taiwan; United Kingdom
- Key people: Hamilton E. James; (chairman); Ron Vachris; (president and CEO)
- Brands: Kirkland Signature
- Services: Merchandise; Cash & carry; Warehouse club; Gas stations
- Revenue: ▲US$275.2 billion (2025)
- Operating income: ▲US$10.4 billion (2025)
- Net income: ▲US$8.1 billion (2025)
- Total assets: ▲US$77.1 billion (2025)
- Total equity: ▲US$29.2 billion (2025)
- Members: ▲145.2 million (2025)
- Number of employees: ▲341,000 (2025)
- Website: costco.com

Original logo (used until 1993, but carried by stores until 2022)

Costco Wholesale Corporation is an American multinational corporation that operates a chain of membership-only big-box warehouse club retail stores. As of 2025, Costco is the third-largest retailer in the world, and as of August 2024, the world's largest retailer of beef, poultry, organic produce, and wine, with just under a third of American consumers regularly shopping at Costco warehouses. As of 2026, Costco is ranked 12th on the Fortune 500 rankings of the largest United States corporations by total revenue.

Costco's worldwide headquarters are in Issaquah, Washington, an eastern suburb of Seattle. Its Kirkland Signature house label is named after its former location in Kirkland, another eastern Seattle suburb. The company opened its first warehouse (the chain's term for its retail outlets) in Seattle in 1983. Through mergers, Costco's corporate history dates back to 1976, when its former competitor Price Club was founded in San Diego, California.

Costco originally began with a wholesale business model aimed at enrolling businesses as members, and later began enrolling individual consumers and selling products intended for them, including its own private-label brand. As of March 2026, Costco operates 924 warehouses worldwide, with 85% of them being in North America (United States, Canada, and Mexico).

== History ==
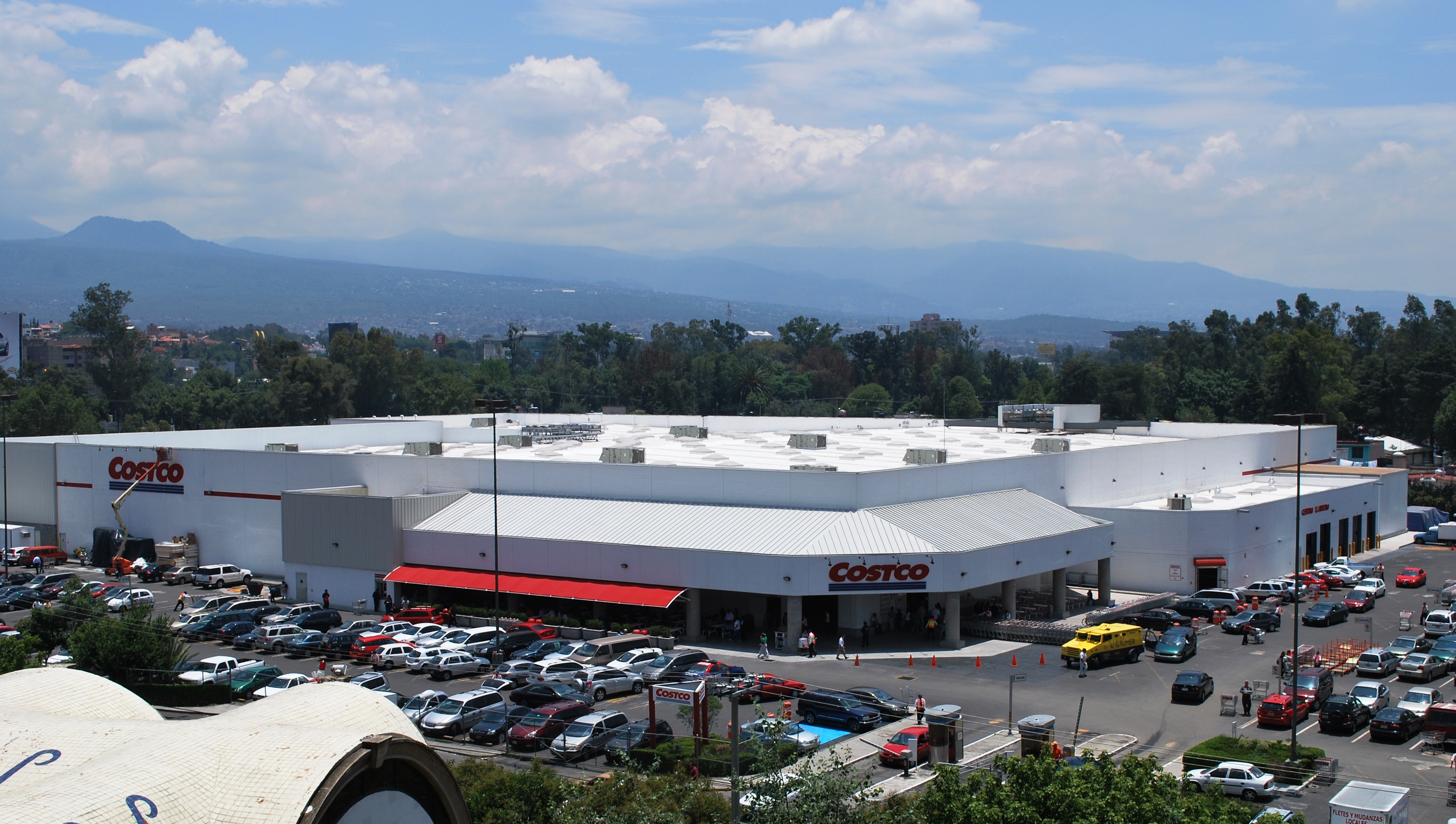
A Costco in Tlalpan in Mexico City

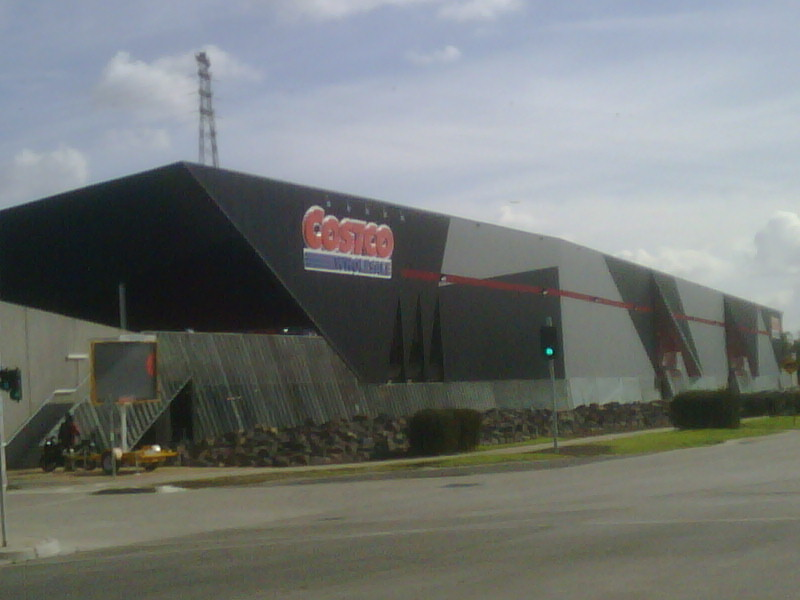
Australia's first Costco, located in Docklands, Victoria, Australia

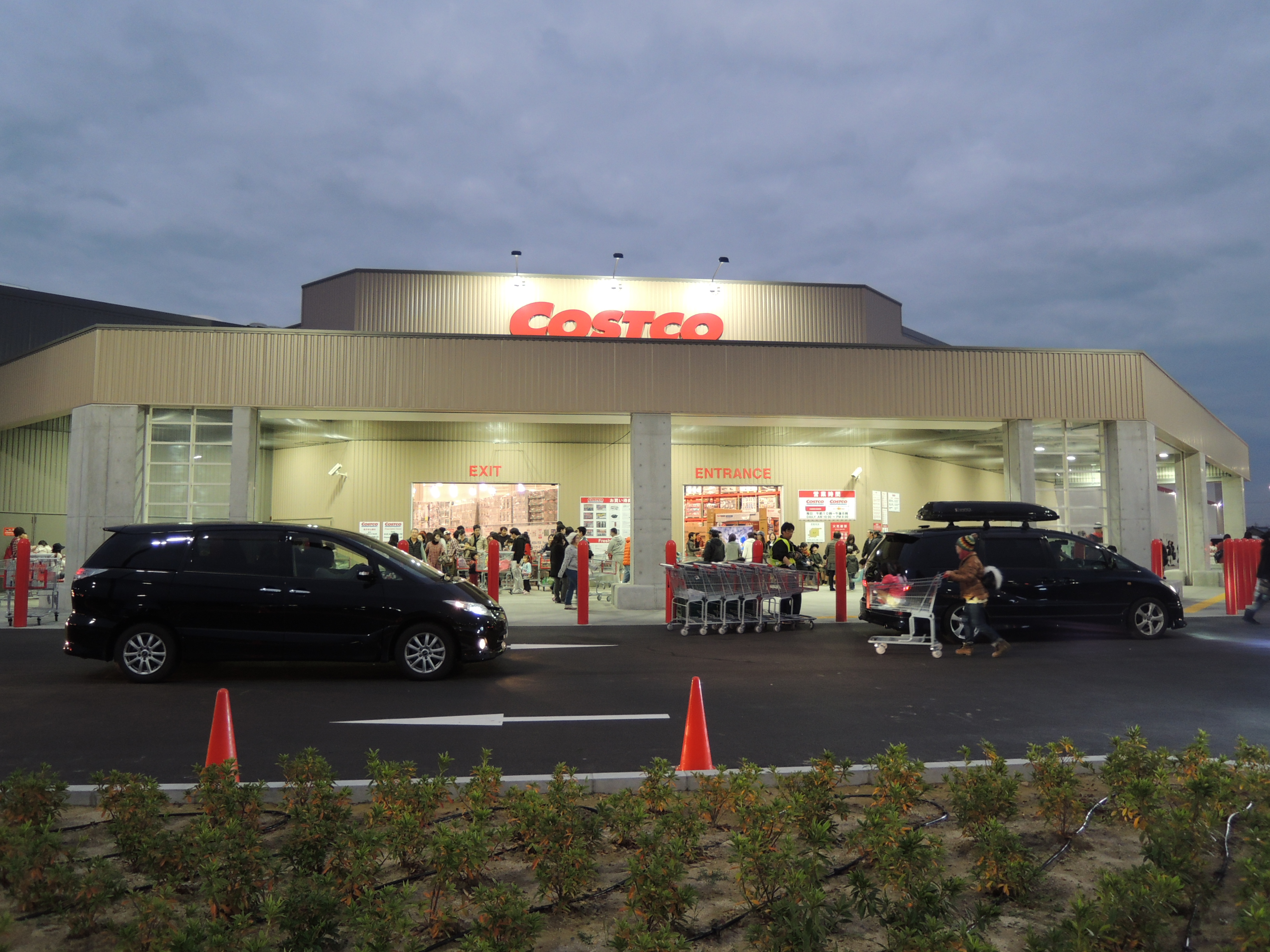
A Costco Wholesale store in Hashima, Gifu, Japan

=== Price Club ===
Costco's earliest predecessor, Price Club, opened its first store on July 12, 1976, on Morena Boulevard in San Diego, California. It was founded three months earlier by Sol Price and his son, Robert, after a dispute with the new owners of FedMart, Price's previous membership-only discount store. Price Club was among the first retail warehouse clubs, beginning with its Morena Boulevard store inside a series of old airplane hangars once owned by Howard Hughes. The store, known as Costco Warehouse #401, is still in operation today.

Price Club's sales model targeted small business owners, selling items in bulk for a discounted price at no-frills outlets that were accessible only with an annual membership fee. The company launched an initial public offering in 1980 and expanded to 24 locations in the Southwest and 1.1 million members by early 1986. Price Club expanded into Canada in 1986, opening a store in Montreal, followed by a Mexico City store in 1992 as part of a joint venture with hypermarket chain Controladora Comercial Mexicana. The company also announced plans to open stores in Spain and Portugal through its Canadian subsidiary.

=== Costco opens ===
Jim Sinegal and Jeffrey H. Brotman opened the first Costco warehouse in Seattle on September 15, 1983. Sinegal had started in wholesale distribution by working for Sol Price at FedMart; Brotman, an attorney from an old Seattle retailing family, had also been involved in retail distribution from an early age. Sinegal began his retail involvement as a grocery bagger. At its launch, Costco sold goods to small businesses at a markup of only 8 or 9 percent over the wholesale price.

A second store opened in Portland, Oregon in October, and a third in Spokane in December 1983. In December 1985, Costco went public, opening on the NASDAQ at $10 per share; at the time, the company had 17 warehouses nationally and 1,950 employees. The company was initially headquartered at its first warehouse in Seattle but moved its headquarters to Kirkland in 1987.

=== The "PriceCostco" merger ===
In 1993, Costco and Price Club agreed to merge operations after Price declined an offer from Walmart to merge Price Club with their warehouse store chain, Sam's Club. Costco's business model and size were similar to those of Price Club, which made the merger more natural for both companies. The combined company took the name PriceCostco, and memberships became universal, meaning that a Price Club member could use their membership to shop at Costco and vice versa. PriceCostco boasted 206 locations generating $16 billion in annual sales. PriceCostco was initially led by executives from both companies, but in 1994, the Prices left the company to form PriceSmart, a warehouse club chain in Central America and the Caribbean unrelated to the current Costco.

Costco moved its headquarters from Kirkland to Issaquah in 1996. It chose to build a new headquarters campus next to a warehouse store to allow buyers to check sales and merchandise. They had originally planned to move by December 1993 to Redmond, another Eastside city, but delays in road construction near the warehouse site caused the company to reconsider. The former Kirkland headquarters, a 10.7-acre (4.3 ha) campus, was sold in late 1996.

The company began testing store conversions to Costco branding across the Southwestern United States in late 1996. PriceCostco officially reverted to using the Costco name and stock symbol in February 1997, with all remaining Price Club locations subsequently rebranded as Costco. In March 2020, Costco announced the acquisition of Innovel, a logistics company, for one billion dollars.

=== Other company milestones ===
The first Costco warehouse in Seattle was replaced with a new building on an adjacent lot to the north in March 2005; the company was able to arrange to keep the same address for the new building, which was on land acquired from Seattle Public Schools. The original building was demolished and replaced by a parking lot, gas station, and car wash—the company's first—which opened in 2006. In 2014, Costco was the third largest retailer in the United States. That year Costco announced plans to open an online store in China using Alibaba Group. Costco entered the Chinese market without a physical store, initially only as an online retailer. The store would sell food and household items to Chinese consumers on Tmall, an e-commerce platform owned by Alibaba Group. Tmall is a business-to-consumer e-commerce platform used by customers in China to purchase items. This allowed Costco to enter the Chinese market without building a brick-and-mortar store. Many other retailers, including Zara, Burberry, and ASOS, also joined Tmall to sell their products, which was an easy way to enter the Chinese market.

Costco announced the opening of 29 new locations in 2016, the most in one year since 2007. Span Construction, led by King Husein, has constructed almost all of Costco's buildings since 1989.

Costco opened its first warehouse in China on August 27, 2019, in Shanghai. The store attracted so many customers that it had to close after only a couple of hours. Soon after opening Costco grappled with fading membership interest and low footfall. With rivals like Alibaba's new retail online/offline model, Hema's Fresh in Shanghai that delivered in doorstep delivery in 30 minutes with extensive online catalogues, both things Costco did not have. Many used membership to get opening day bargains, only to seek membership refunds and cancellations. Free perks from Alibaba's e-commerce sites further fueled drop-offs, resulting in dropping renewal rates to around 60% in China.The first Costco in New Zealand opened at West Auckland in September 2022, delayed from mid-August due to the economic impact of the COVID-19 pandemic.

=== Costco today ===
Costco vs Sam's Club locations in the United States

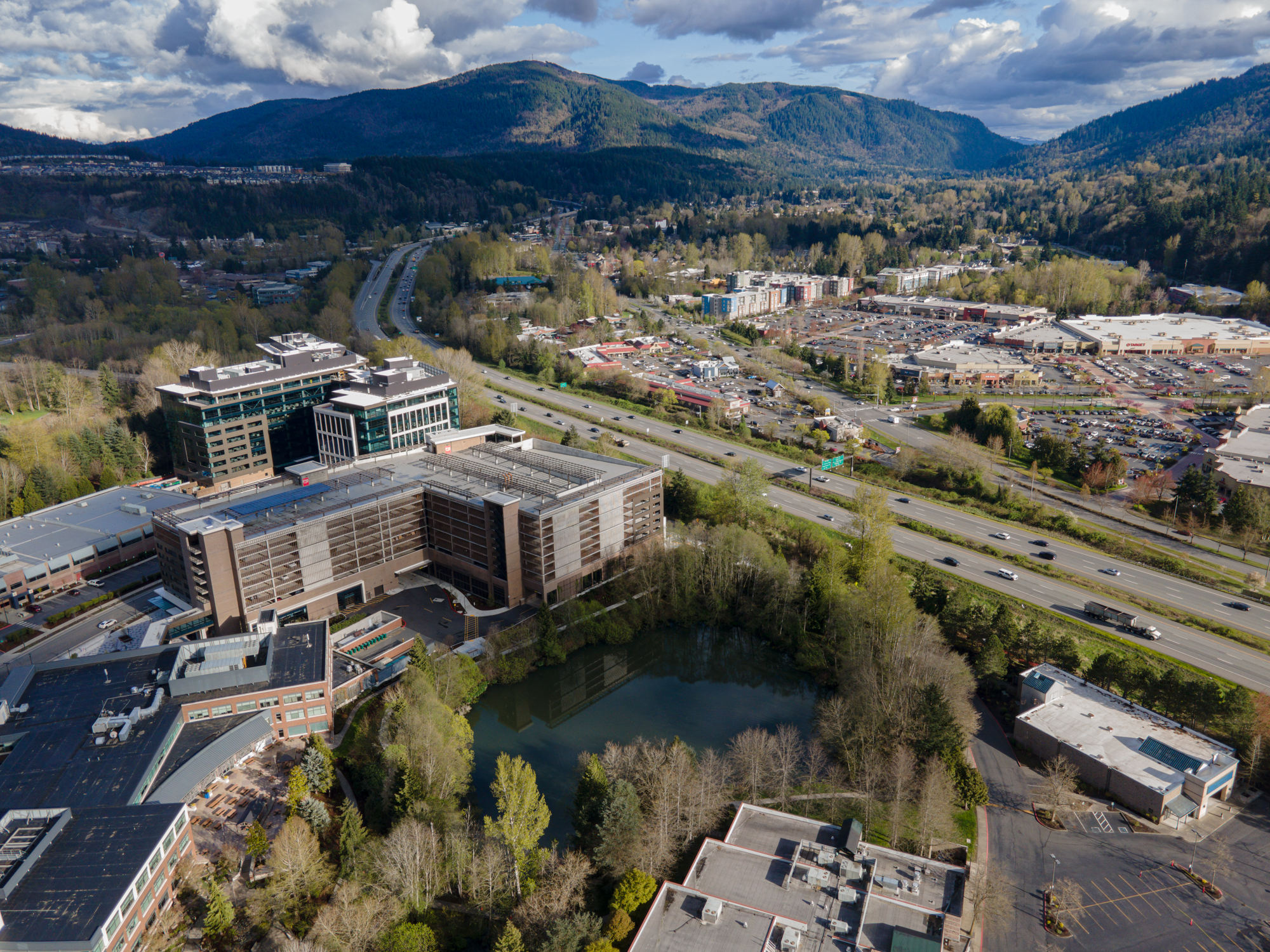
An aerial view of Costco's Issaquah headquarters campus showing Buildings 3, 4, and 5 (left side)

In the United States, Costco's main competitors operating membership warehouses are Sam's Club (a subsidiary of Walmart) and BJ's Wholesale Club. Costco employs 316,000 full and part-time employees worldwide. Costco had 90.3 million members in 2017. In 2020, Costco had 105.5 million members. In 2021, the company had 111.6 million members. As of November 2023, Costco had 129.5 million members. As of February 2026, Costco has over 145.9 million cardholders and 81.4 paid memberships, which is up approximately 5% year over year.

Costco was the first company to grow from $0 in sales to $3 billion in sales in under six years. For the fiscal year ending on August 31, 2012, the company's sales totaled $97.062 billion, with $1.709 billion net profit. As of 2019, Costco is ranked No. 14 on the Fortune 500 rankings of the largest United States corporations by total revenue. The ACSI (The American Customer Satisfaction Index) named Costco number one in the specialty retail store industry with a score of 84 in 2014.

From December 2013, Costco's board of directors was chaired by co-founder Jeffrey H. Brotman and included Sinegal, co-founder and director, and two company officers: the president and CEO W. Craig Jelinek and CFO Richard A. Galanti. On August 1, 2017, Brotman died. As of August 2017, Sinegal and Jelinek remained on the board. Jim Sinegal stepped down in 2018.

During the 2010s, Costco outgrew its original three-building headquarters campus in the Pickering Place area of Issaquah—known simply as Buildings 1, 2, and 3—and was forced to put new employees into various leased buildings throughout the city. In April 2019, Costco broke ground on Building 5, a multilevel parking garage with an attached meeting center and fitness center, followed in January 2020 by Building 4, a nine-story office tower next to Interstate 90. The two new buildings were finished in June 2023, and then Costco moved its headquarters employees from Buildings 1, 2, and 3 into the new Building 4. The three original buildings were repurposed for the use of Costco's information technology department.

In September 2024, Costco raised its membership fees, increasing Gold Star and Business memberships from $60 to $65 and Executive memberships from $120 to $130, affecting 52 million members, and raising the Executive reward cap from $1,000 to $1,250. In June 2017, fees had increased from $55 to $60 for Gold Star and Business and from $110 to $120 for Executive memberships. In 2024, Costco implemented barcode scanners at warehouse entrances, requiring members to scan the QR code on their physical or digital card to prevent membership sharing, replacing the practice of showing cards. Also in 2024, food court access was restricted to members only, ending non-member purchases. Starting June 2025, select locations, such as Manhattan, will offer exclusive 9 a.m. shopping hours for Executive Members to provide a less crowded experience. These changes align with Costco's strategy to bolster its membership model, which generated 65.5% of its 2024 net operating income, by enhancing exclusivity and revenue.

In November 2025, Costco filed a lawsuit against the federal government seeking a complete refund of tariffs imposed by the Trump Administration. The lawsuit, filed with the United States Court of International Trade in New York, asks the Supreme Court to find the administration's use of the International Emergency Economic Powers Act to impose tariffs unlawful.

== Locations ==
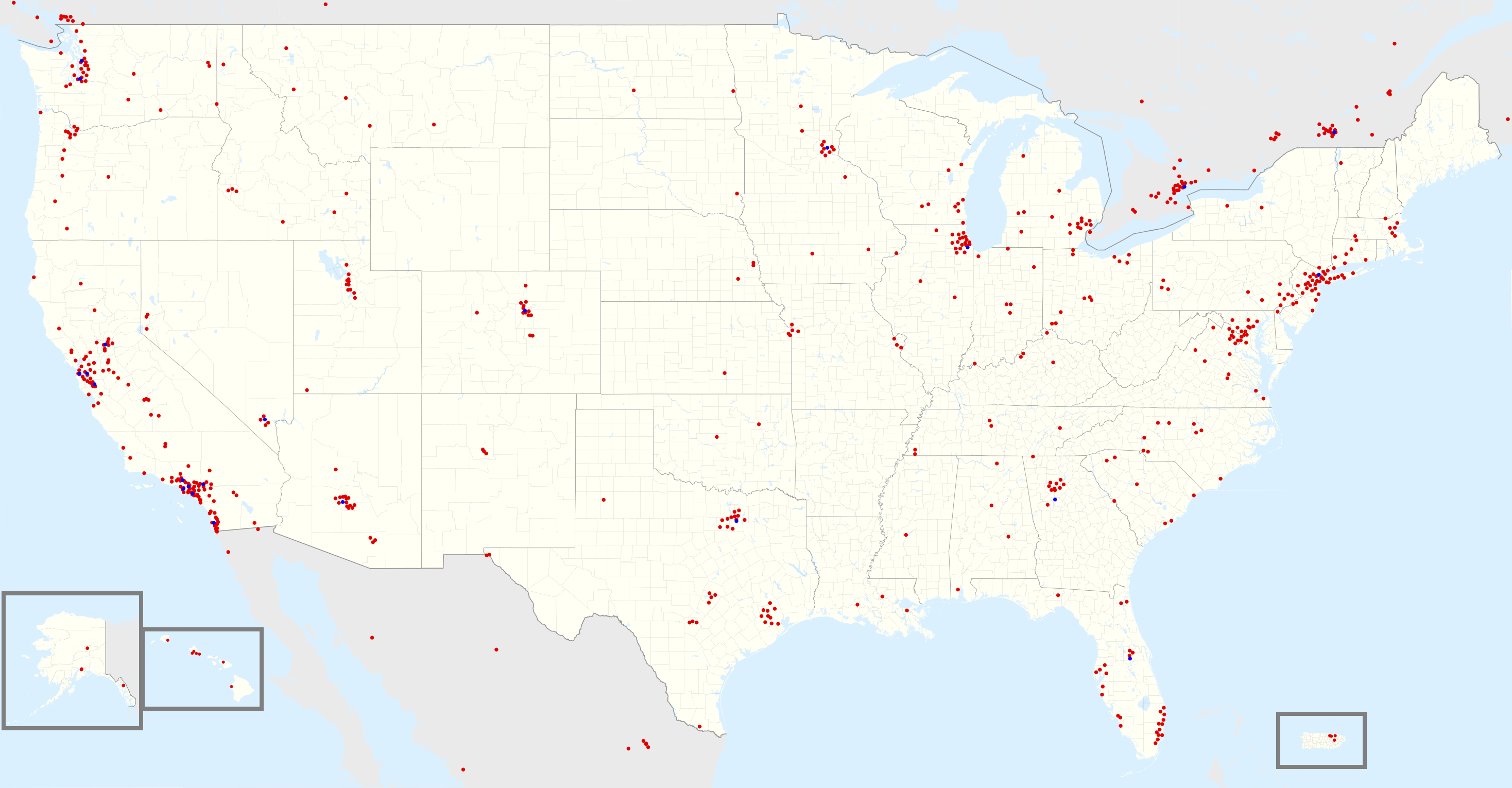
Map of Costco warehouses in the US (including Puerto Rico), as well as parts of Canada and Mexico (January 2021) Red: Wholesale locations Blue: Business center locations

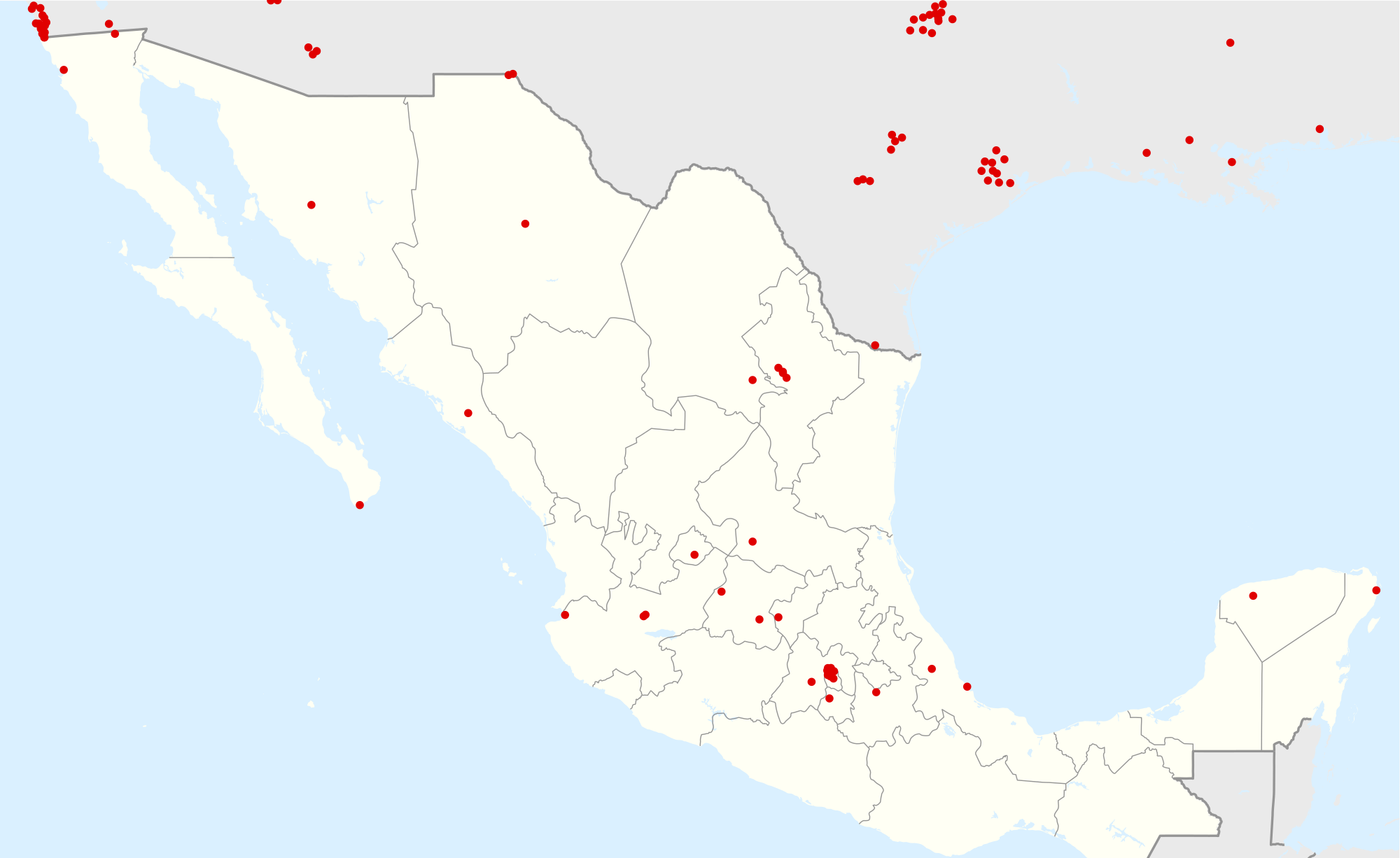
Map of Costco warehouses in Mexico, as well as parts of the US (January 2021)

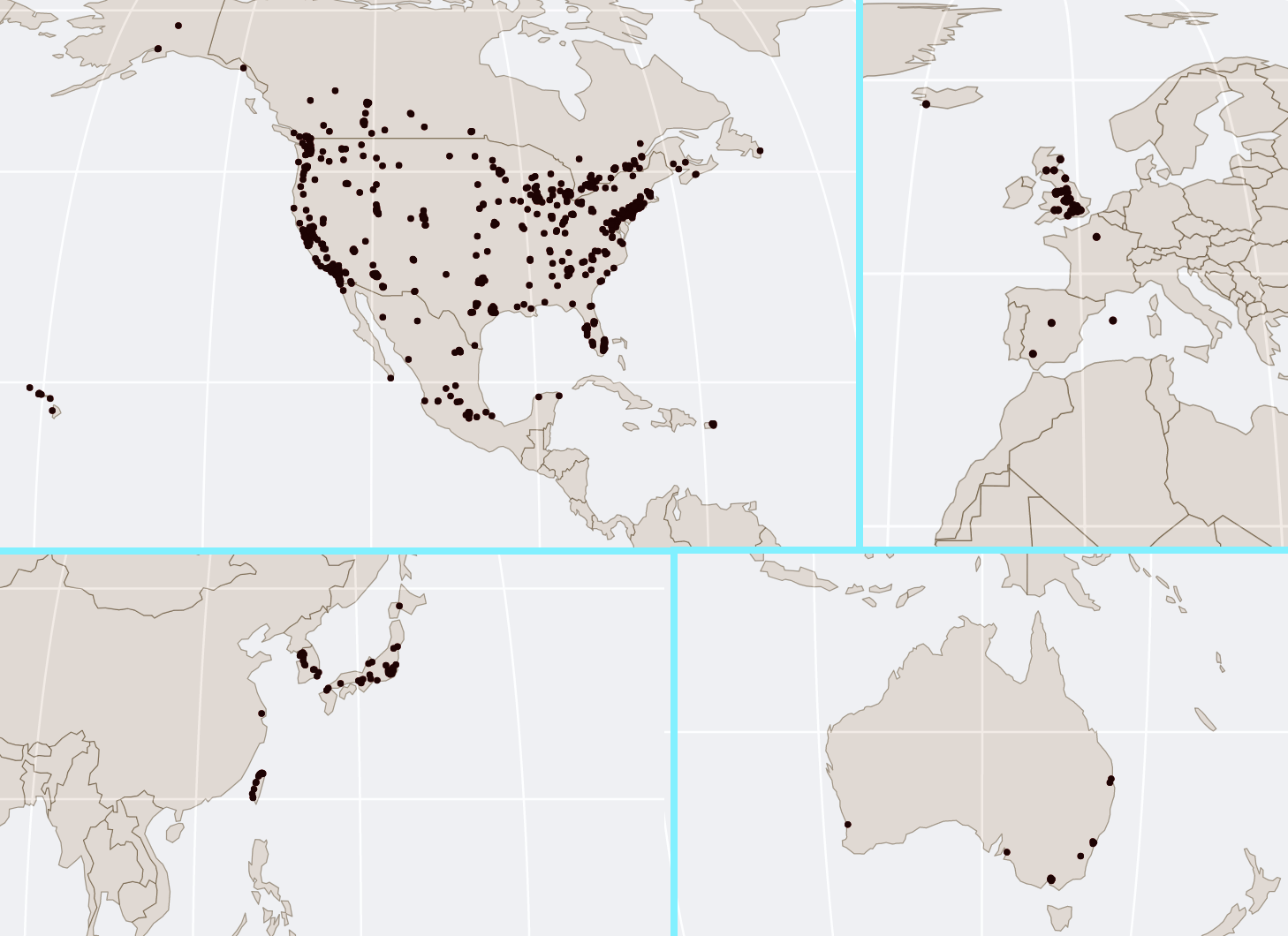
Map of Costco warehouses around the world (January 2021)

Countries in which Costco operates

As of November 2025, Costco operates 924 warehouses worldwide.

- 634 in the United States (including Puerto Rico)
- 114 in Canada
- 42 in Mexico
- 37 in Japan
- 29 in the United Kingdom
- 20 in South Korea
- 15 in Australia
- 14 in Taiwan
- 7 in China
- 5 in Spain
- 3 in France
- 2 in Sweden
- 1 in Iceland
- 1 in New Zealand

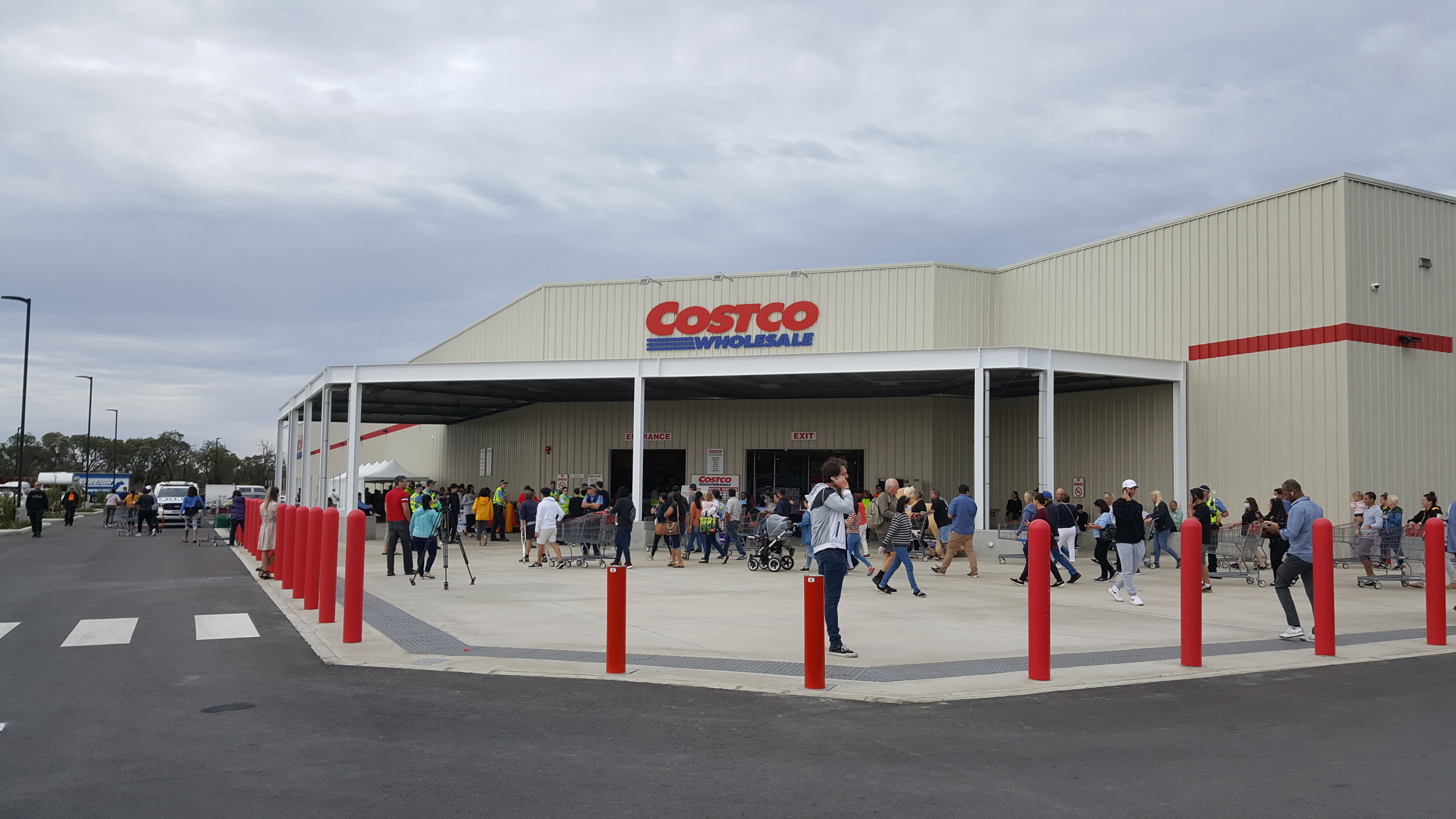
The Costco in Perth Airport opened in March 2020.

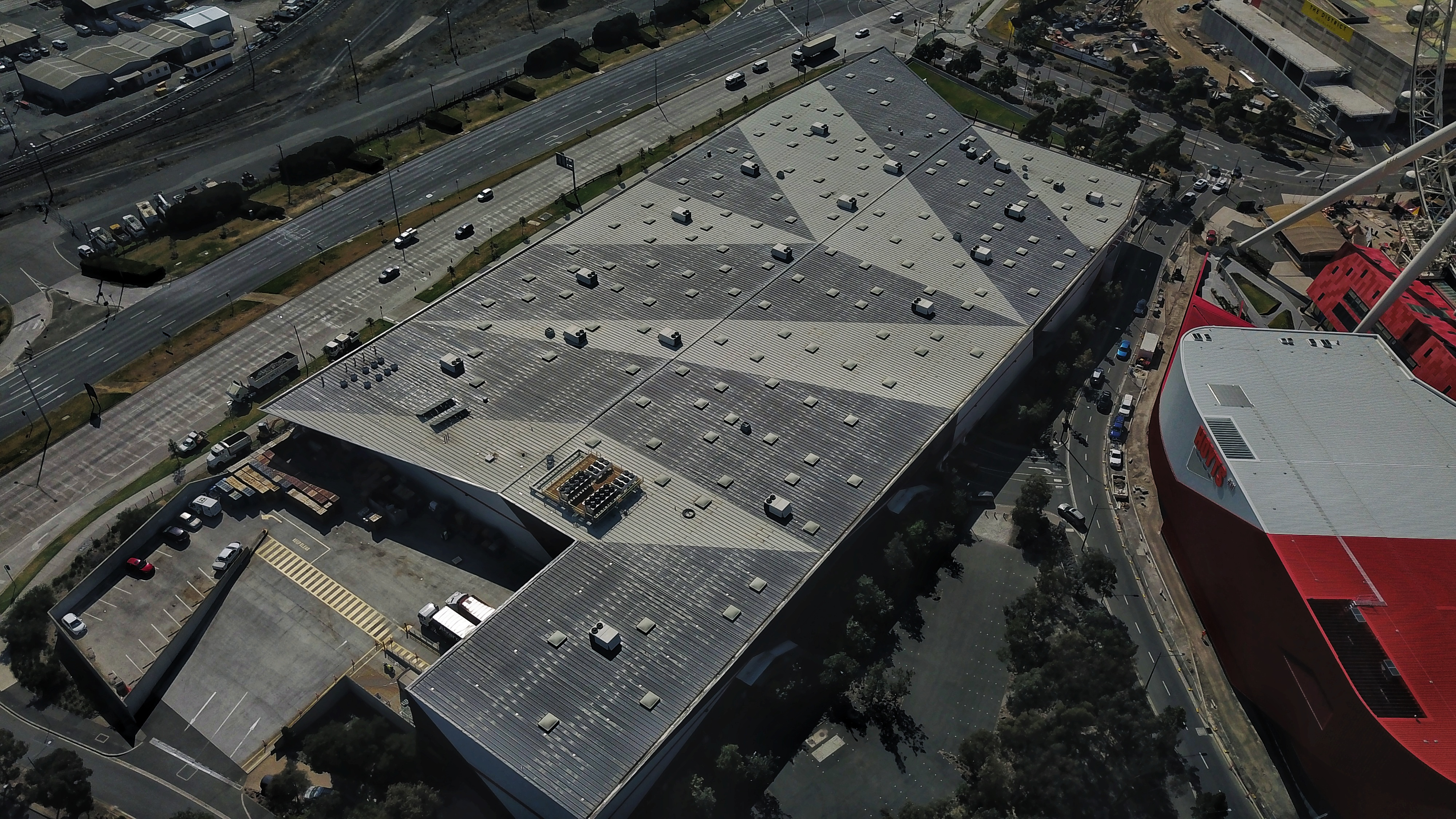
Aerial perspective of the Costco roof at Melbourne's Docklands store in March 2019

The company's warehouses throughout the world are all similarly designed, featuring generally identical layout, signage, and parking lot markings. A typical warehouse uses a simple loop for its main corridor from the entrance to the checkout area. Costco has contracted with architecture firm MG2 for over 800 of its locations, which are typically built within a 110-day schedule.

Food court menus are tailored for local preferences, with meat pies on offer in Australia; poutine in Canada; seafood-topped pizza in Asian locations; pastor taco-topped pizzas in Mexico; clam chowder in Japan, South Korea, and Taiwan; plokkfiskur in Iceland; and jacket potatoes in the United Kingdom.

In Canada, the company participates in the voluntary Scanner Price Accuracy Code managed by the Retail Council of Canada.

=== Warehouses in mixed-use development ===
In September 2024, Costco broke ground on its first-ever mixed-use development in the United States that combines a warehouse store with residential apartments above it. The project, developed in partnership with the real estate developer Thrive Living, includes 800 rental apartments above the 185,000-square-foot (17,200 m^{2}) Costco warehouse in the Baldwin Village neighborhood of South Los Angeles, California. Of the 800 apartments, 184 (23%) will be dedicated to low-income housing, with the remainder offered as workforce and unsubsidized housing. The project is made possible by California's state law AB 2011 for affordable housing, which went into effect on July 1, 2023. On June 1, 2026, Costco announced a second mixed-use store modeled after the Los Angeles location in Waipahu, Hawaii. The store, across from the Hōʻaeʻae West Loch Skyline metro station, will knock down the currently vacant Don Quijote store and nearby Zippy's restaurant to make way for a new mixed-use Costco Business Center with a gas station. This will be the first mixed-use Costco Business Center in the United States and the first mixed-use Costco with a gas station.

=== Largest and smallest warehouses ===
A Costco Wholesale store in Ocean Township, Monmouth County, New Jersey

In 2005, Costco's largest store (by area) was in Hillsboro, Oregon, with 148,663 sq ft (13,811.2 m^{2}). In 2015, Costco completed an expansion in Salt Lake City, Utah, making it the new largest Costco at 235,000 sq ft (21,800 m^{2}). The Salt Lake City store was the first to be expanded into a hybrid between the conventional Costco warehouse format and the newer Costco Business Center format, which explains its gigantic size.

In 2023, Costco had planned to build a new warehouse store in Fresno, California, with a 241,000 sq ft (22,400 m^{2}) footprint, making it the largest store. But the city only approved 219,000 sq ft (20,300 m^{2}). In 2019, Costco opened its biggest store in Canada, in St. John's, Newfoundland and Labrador; the store is 182,000 sq ft (16,900 m^{2}).

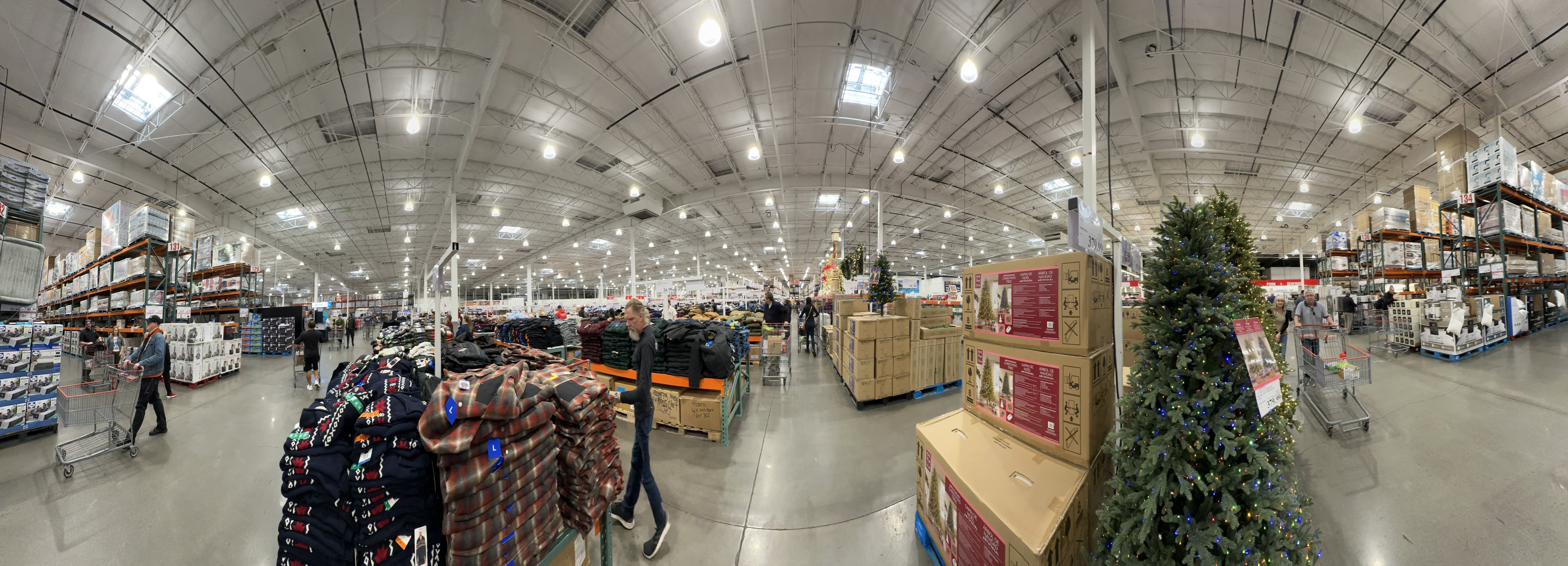
Panorama of the largest Costco warehouse location, in Salt Lake City, Utah

As of 2019, the smallest Costco is in Juneau, Alaska at 76,696 sq ft (7,125.3 m^{2}). The warehouse is the only one left from a 1993 initiative in which Costco experimented with small-format warehouses. Although the company concluded that the small format does not work for most markets, it determined that the format was acceptable for Juneau.

=== Costco Business Centers ===
Costco Business Centers are warehouses similar to regular Costco warehouses and are open to all Costco members, regardless of membership type. Their merchandise caters primarily to businesses, with a focus on small businesses. Business Centers do not carry most consumer items, such as clothing, jewelry, media, and tires, but do carry larger quantities and more options of business products. More than 70% of the items that can be acquired from a Costco Business Center are not found in a typical Costco store. Some locations have a food court, a gas station, or both. They have ample parking space for trucks and can deliver goods to businesses in bulk, with a $25 delivery charge for orders below $250. Costco Business Center operating hours are shorter than regular warehouses (usually opening at 7:00 am on Mondays to Saturdays and closed on Sundays), while discounts and coupons for Business Centers are issued separately from regular warehouses.

The first Business Center was a converted Costco warehouse in Lynnwood, Washington, which reopened in October 1996, following renovations; the change was made after a conventional Costco warehouse had opened in nearby Everett.

=== Costco Home Showroom ===
In 2022, Costco opened a Costco Home Showroom in San Juan, Puerto Rico, and then opened a second one in Anchorage, Alaska, in 2024. A third one opened in Pearl City, Hawaii, in 2024.

Unlike traditional Costco warehouses and the defunct Costco Home format, the Home Showroom format is not a cash-and-carry store. The showroom cannot sell goods on the spot to members to take home with them that same day; members must place orders to be delivered to their homes. It is merely a showroom for "expensive, large, and bulky items" like furniture and appliances. Costco had already begun to offer a broader selection of furniture and appliances through Costco.com than it could fit into its traditional warehouses, but found that it was "daunting" for many people to order those items online without having first touched, felt, and seen the goods in person.

=== Costco Standalone Gas Stations ===
In 2026, Costco opened its first standalone gas station in Mission Viejo, California. A second one will be opening up in Honolulu, Hawaii, with full development expected to be completed in 2027.

== Finances ==
Sales by business (2023)
Business	Share
Food and sundries	40.5%
Non-foods	25.6%
Warehouse ancillary and other	20.5%
Fresh foods	13.5%

Sales by region (2023)
Region	Share
United States	72.9%
Canada	13.6%
Other international	13.5%

Year	Revenue in million US$	Net income in million US$	Price per Share in US$ (year end)	Warehouses	Employees	Ref(s).
2005	52,935	1,063	33.80	433	115,000	
2006	60,151	1,103	36.47	458	127,000	
2007	64,400	1,083	48.58	488	127,000	
2008	72,483	1,283	36.93	512	137,000	
2009	71,422	1,086	42.23	527	142,000	
2010	77,946	1,303	52.22	540	147,000	
2011	88,915	1,462	60.96	592	164,000	
2012	99,137	1,709	78.29	608	174,000	
2013	105,156	2,039	95.38	634	184,000	
2014	112,640	2,058	114.90	663	195,000	
2015	116,199	2,377	136.72	686	205,000	
2016	118,719	2,350	137.10	715	218,000	
2017	129,025	2,679	167.77	741	231,000	
2018	141,576	3,134	185.54	768	245,000	
2019	152,703	3,659	270.33	782	254,000	
2020	166,761	4,002	358.50	795	273,000	
2021	195,929	5,007	544.25	815	288,000	
2022	226,954	5,844	440.54	838	304,000	
2023	242,290	6,292	656.27	871	316,000	
2024	254,453	7,367	954.07	890	333,000	
2025	275,235	8,099		914	341,000	

=== Sales volume ===
In 2011, Costco's highest-volume store was in Seoul, South Korea. In 2018, the store in Taichung, Taiwan, ranked at the top in the number of members and was second in the world in sales volume, behind South Korea's Yangjae store in Seoul. Of the 14 Costco operations in Taiwan, three ranked in the top 10 in the world in sales volume: Taichung, Neihu, and Chungho.

== Ownership ==
Costco is mainly owned by institutional investors, who own over 70% of shares. The largest shareholders as of September 2024 are:

- The Vanguard Group (9.40%)
- BlackRock (7.56%)
- State Street Corporation (4.06%)
- Geode Capital Management (2.14%)
- Morgan Stanley (2.13%)
- Fidelity Investments (FMR) (2.10%)
- Bank of America (1.59%)
- Norges Bank (1.20%)
- Northern Trust (1.05%)
- BNY Mellon (1.01%)

== Business model ==
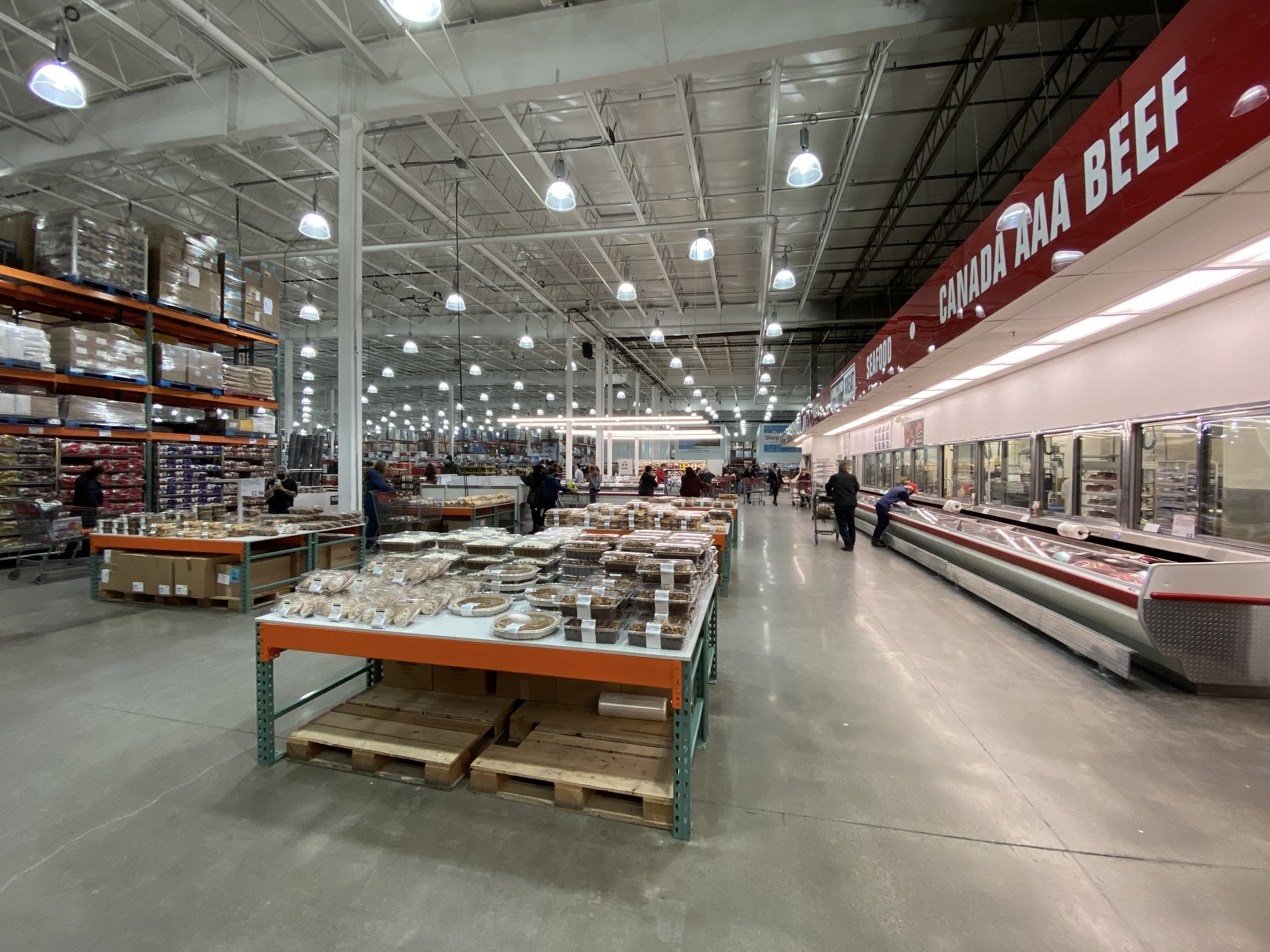
Costco warehouse interior in Brampton, Ontario in Canada in 2021

Costco is a membership-only warehouse where customers must purchase a membership to access the warehouse and make purchases. Revenue from membership fees accounts for the majority of the company's profits, accounting for over 72% of the company's net operating income in fiscal years 2022 and 2023, and 65.5% in fiscal year 2024. (Note: Costco's fiscal year ends September 1.)

Costco divides its business into three segments for reporting revenue and operating income. The segments, ordered by size, are:

- United States Operations (72.4% of total revenue) (Note: For the fiscal year ending September 1, 2024)
- Other International Operations (13.9% of total revenue)
- Canadian Operations (13.7% of total revenue)

=== Sales model ===
One company rule states that no regular item may be marked up more than 14% over cost, and no Kirkland Signature item may be marked up more than 15% over cost. The company runs very lean, with overhead costs at about 10% of revenue and profit margins at 2%. For example, Costco has no public relations department and buys no outside advertising.

Costco's sales model focuses on limited selection over variety. Although consumer products often come in wide different varieties, Costco will not carry most of those variants, but instead will carry only one or two examples of what is essentially the same product and try to sell a higher volume of units at a lower price. Thus, a typical Costco warehouse carries only 3,700 distinct products, while a typical Walmart Supercenter carries approximately 140,000 products. If the wholesale price of any individual product is too high, they will refuse to stock the product. For example, in November 2009, Costco announced it would stop selling Coca-Cola products because the soft drink maker refused to lower its wholesale prices. Costco resumed selling Coca-Cola products the following month. Finally, Costco insists that manufacturers must package their products in large sizes and properly arrange them on pallets suitable for deployment to its warehouses. However, unlike most chain stores, Costco does not sell shelf space to manufacturers.

Due to its size and its selective approach to buying products, Costco has become an "arbiter" between manufacturers and consumers. To some small manufacturers, the reward for jumping through numerous hoops to sell products to Costco opens the possibility of obtaining international distribution through the company's warehouses in other countries. If a manufacturer's product is popular at warehouses in its home country, Costco may look into whether members in other countries might also be interested in that product.

Although the company engages in visible efforts to reduce costs, the stores themselves are expensive. In 2013, Costco spent approximately $80 million on each of the new stores it opened.

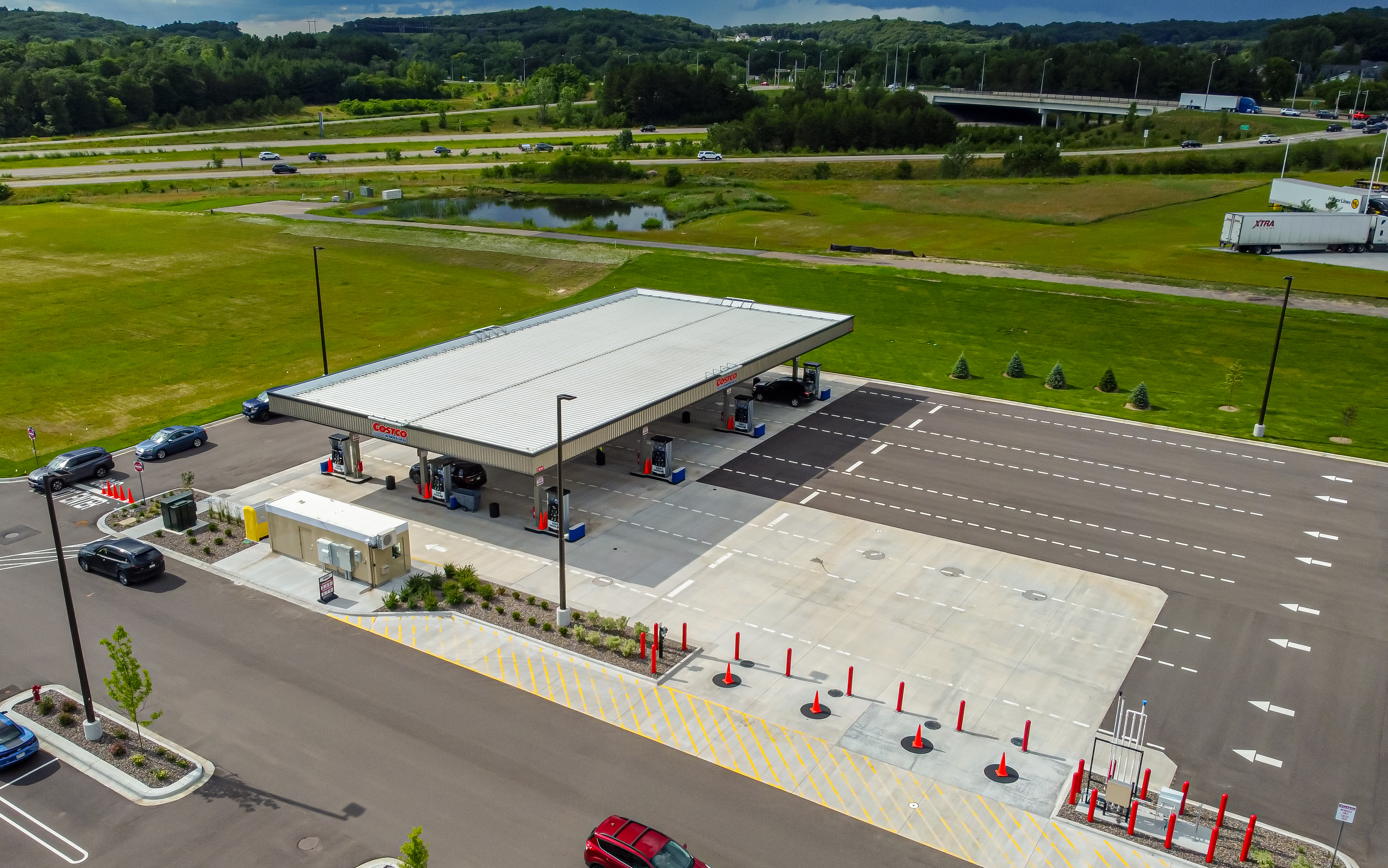
Costco gas station in Eau Claire, Wisconsin

The cost is partly driven by real estate, as each new store requires enough space to support a building approximately 150,000 ft^{2} (14,000 m^{2}) in size, a large parking lot, and often a gas station. Lighting costs are reduced on sunny days because most Costco locations have several skylights. During the day, electronic light meters measure how much light is coming in the skylights and turn off an appropriate percentage of the interior lights. During an average sunny day, it is normal for the center section of the warehouse not to have interior lights in use.

Rotisserie chickens are a major driver of customer traffic and sales for Costco, which has sold them since 1994 amid the then-rising popularity of Boston Market. In response to the annual growth of per-capita chicken consumption in the United States, Costco opened a factory in Nebraska in 2019 that implemented vertical integration across all aspects of poultry production in a bid to keep its pricing intact while maintaining consistent quality control of them. In some international markets, Costco also offers sushi that is made in-house; the Issaquah warehouse became the first US store to have in-house sushi in 2023.

Costco is known for its "exit greeters", who briefly compare receipts against shopping cart contents as customers exit. They are trained to quickly count cart contents and serve as customer service to verify that customers were charged correctly, have redeemed any voucher-based items (e.g., tickets), and have not missed items in the lower racks of their cart. Costco has used exit greeters since its first store opened in Seattle in 1983.

=== Management model ===
Costco is known for a strong corporate culture which encourages and rewards loyalty and promotes from within. As of 2024, Costco claims to have a retention rate over 90% for new employees who make it to one year. Many of its senior executives started as front-line employees in its warehouses and spent many years rising through the ranks to reach their current positions. For example, Ron Vachris started in 1982 as a forklift driver at a Price Club in Arizona and became only the third chief executive officer in Costco's history in 2024. Since 95% of the company's workforce is in its warehouses, and so many of its executives started their careers there, the company's culture is tightly focused on supporting the warehouse experience.

At Costco headquarters in Issaquah, all 7,000 headquarters employees sit in cubicles, including the chief executive officer. However, the CEO does get to have a slightly larger cubicle. All Costco executives are expected to get out of the office regularly and spend the majority of their time in the field visiting warehouses and solving problems. The CEO attempts to visit as many warehouses as possible around the world in a cycle every 18 to 24 months, while executives responsible for smaller geographical areas are expected to visit all the warehouses under their supervision much more often.

=== Online shopping ===
Costco primarily focuses on getting members to come in to a warehouse for purchases, instead of ordering products online. In November 1998, the company launched Costco Online, its online shopping site. The site expanded to incorporate B2B e-commerce on April 17, 2001. Due to the COVID-19 pandemic, Costco's online sales increased dramatically, with more online sales growth in 2020 than the previous five years combined.

Costco operates online stores in only some of the countries in which it has warehouses: the U.S., Canada, the U.K., Mexico, South Korea, Taiwan, Japan, and Australia. Instacart offers Costco delivery in a select number of states, including Arizona, California, Colorado, Florida, Georgia, Illinois, Indiana, Massachusetts, Maryland, Minnesota, Missouri, North Carolina, New Jersey, New York, Oregon, Tennessee, Texas, Virginia, Washington, and the District of Columbia. In Canada, Costco uses Instacart for online grocery delivery for non–dry goods, pantry staples, and household essentials.

Similarly, in March 2017, Costco initiated a partnership with Shipt, an online grocery delivery service. Unlike Instacart, Shipt charges its own membership fee, $99 a year or $14 a month, in exchange for free delivery on orders over $35. As of November 2018, Shipt offers Costco delivery in select Florida markets. In October 2017, Costco launched same-day and two-day grocery delivery options for members. In Iceland, Costco began in June 2023 to allow individuals over the age of 20 to purchase alcoholic beverages online and pick them up at the warehouse stores. The "click and collect" arrangement was previously only available to businesses with a liquor license.

== Products ==
Costco frequently rotates its inventory, often stocking items temporarily or seasonally. In 2017, Sinegal described this as a "treasure-hunt atmosphere". This model creates a "sense of urgency" in shoppers to impulsively buy a good deal as soon as they spot one because it may not be available at the next visit.

Over the years, Costco has significantly expanded its product range. While initially focusing on bulk, boxed items easily displayed in store by removing the stretch wrap from a pallet, Costco's offerings now include a diverse array of items of all shapes and sizes. These range from art, books, caskets, and clothing, to computer software, fine wine, furniture, home appliances, electronics, hot tubs, jewelry, and various perishable goods like dairy, baked items, flowers, produce, meat, and seafood. Other items, such as solar panels, tires, and vacuum cleaners, have also found their way into Costco's product lineup. Its growth has led it to become a dominant purchaser for some goods. As of 2025, Costco sold more than half of the world's cashews, for example, with direct implications for over a million cashew farmers in Africa.

Beyond products, many Costco warehouses feature additional services including gas stations, pharmacies, hearing aid centers, optometry and eyewear departments, and tire installation garages.

=== Alcohol ===
Alcohol sales at Costco vary by location due to differing regulations. In some places, separate liquor stores exist to comply with licensing laws, whereas in others, alcohol is available in the main warehouse alongside general merchandise. In certain states, like Texas, liquor sales must be conducted by a separate business entity with its own staff.

Costco's desire to alter its alcohol sales structure in its home state faced a setback in 2006 when it lost its court battle against the state of Washington's requirement for retailers to buy wine through the state-controlled system. The company then changed strategies. Costco spent over $22 million to support Initiative 1183, compared with $11.75 million from opponents, making it "the most expensive initiative fight" in Washington's history. In the November 8, 2011, election, Initiative 1183 passed with 60 percent of the vote and led to the demolition of Washington's government's monopoly on the distribution of liquor and spirits for retail sale through state-owned and state-licensed liquor stores.

The Costco warehouses with the largest wine departments have a "wine steward" who roams the department and advises Costco customers on which wines best suit their needs. As of October 2024, Costco employed about 30 wine stewards at its US warehouses. In the 21st century, Costco has made its store openings into special events by featuring special selections of whiskey, wine, and other alcoholic beverages that are extremely rare and not normally sold at its warehouses, or extremely cheap, or both. For the October 2024 opening of Costco's first warehouse in Napa, California, die-hard whiskey fans began camping out on the sidewalk six days in advance.

International operations must navigate regional laws as well. For example, Costco's first store in Victoria, Australia, operates under the country's relatively liberal alcohol licensing laws, allowing sales directly off the shelf as is common in most European countries. However, in New Zealand, Costco's sole warehouse in West Auckland is restricted from selling alcohol due to a local monopoly on liquor retail.

=== Books ===
For its first four decades, Costco was a major American bookseller in its own right, in an era in which e-commerce giant Amazon and big-box bookstore chain Barnes & Noble were wiping out traditional bookstores. Costco became one of the few American brick-and-mortar retail outlets where many shoppers who rarely visited bookstores could easily detour to the book section to browse hard-copy books, discover books they might not have otherwise noticed, and buy them right away. When Costco chose to buy any particular book, it usually acquired tens of thousands of copies, which was important to a publishing industry where a print run of 50,000 copies is a big deal.

In the 2020s, Costco management reportedly began considering discontinuing books as a year-round product category because they are extremely labor intensive. New books must be unpacked and laid out by hand on tables when released each Tuesday, while books that failed to sell must be manually collected and returned to their publishers.

In 2022, Costco quietly closed the year-round book sections in its Alaska and Hawaii warehouses. In June 2024, several publishing executives warned that in January 2025, Costco was planning to do the same across its 600 warehouses in the contiguous United States. In other words, books would become just one more rotating inventory item for eight months each year and would reappear as a full section only during the holiday shopping season in the last four months of each year. This was deeply alarming to a publishing industry already facing stagnating book sales. In November 2024, Costco agreed to keep year-round book sections for the time being in 100 of its 600 mainland US warehouses.

=== Gold and platinum bullion products ===
Costco began selling one-ounce, 24-karat gold bars in October 2023. While typically selling for about 2% above the spot price, Costco offers 2% cash back for executive members and another 2% for users of certain credit cards. Thus, it is seen as a low-profit venture for Costco and a loss leader for increasing store memberships.

In 2024, following the success of gold bar products, Costco began selling platinum .9995 fine bars as a direct-to-consumer product eligible for purchase on its website.

=== Kirkland Signature ===
Kirkland Signature logo

Sample products carrying the Kirkland Signature private brand label

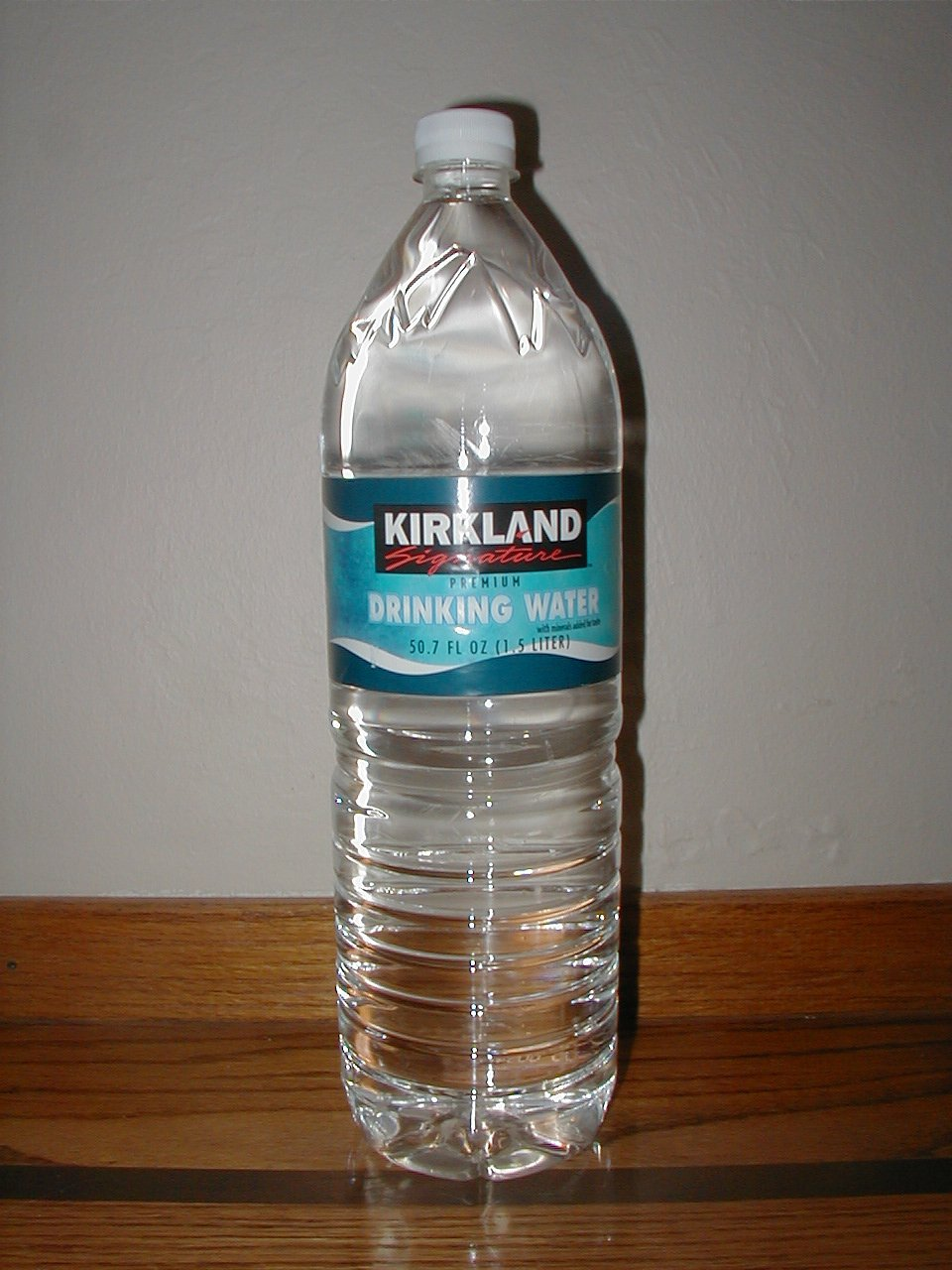
Bottled water

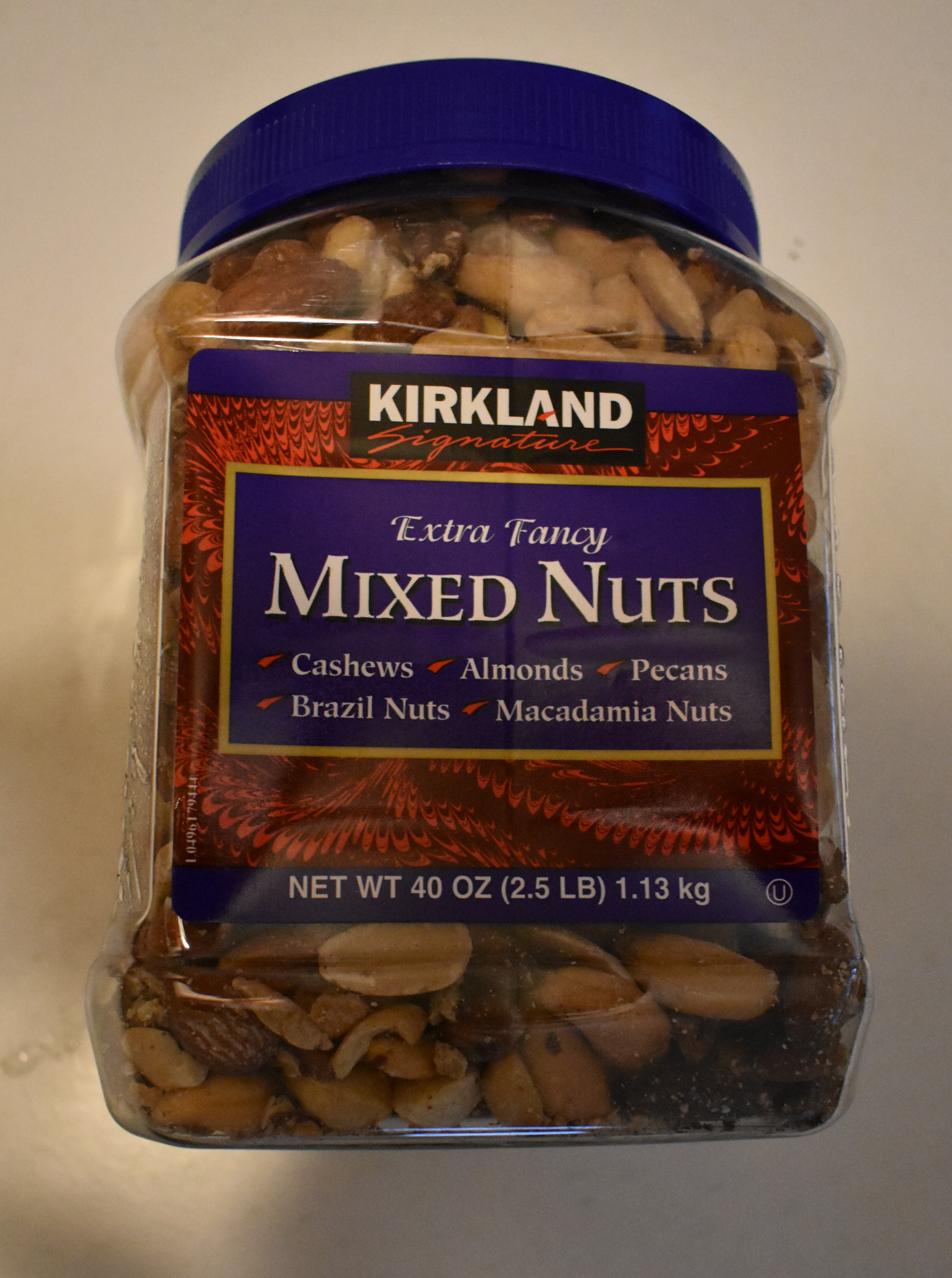
"Extra Fancy Mixed Nuts"

Kirkland Signature is Costco's private label brand, featured on a wide array of products sold across Costco's warehouses and its website. Launched in 1995, the brand takes its name from the original location of Costco's corporate headquarters in Kirkland, Washington. It accounts for nearly one-third of the company's sales and outpaces the growth of Costco's overall sales. In 2024, the Kirkland Signature brand recorded $86 billion in revenue. The Kirkland Signature brand aimed to offer products with name-brand quality at discounted prices. Costco has adopted a strategy of co-branding certain items with well-known manufacturers to bolster consumer trust. Notable co-branded products include those from Chinet, Jelly Belly, Keurig Green Mountain, Ocean Spray, Stearns & Foster, Walker's Shortbread and Starbucks. Additionally, while some Kirkland Signature products maintain a generic label, they are produced in partnership with other companies. From the perspective of manufacturers, one advantage of entering into a Kirkland Signature private label deal is that it frees them from the burden of sales and marketing campaigns to establish brand awareness among consumers.

== Publications ==
=== Costco Connection ===
Costco Connection is a magazine sent free to Costco executive members; it is also available online to anyone, free of charge. As of 2024, the magazine is distributed to 15.4 million households and has 300,000 copies across its warehouses. It has the third-highest magazine circulation in the United States, behind two AARP magazines.

The magazine was established in 1987 as a newsprint publication and converted to a magazine in 1997. It features articles which regularly tie into the corporation along with business, celebrity features, cooking, entertaining, health, home improvement, and social articles, as well as coupons and ads. MediaPost reports: "While about 90% of the magazine's advertising is co-op, increasingly national advertisers such as Procter & Gamble are buying space, notes Roeglin--presumably because of the pub's gargantuan reach and the data it has on its subscribers (whose average household income is $156,000 a year). 'We see about 56% of our subscribers a month buy something at one of our stores based on something they've read in the magazine,' says Roeglin."

== Services ==
=== Concierge service ===
Costco offers a free "concierge" service to members who purchase electronics to help answer questions about setup and use, and to avoid potential returns due to not understanding how to use the products.

=== Costco Auto and Home Insurance ===
Costco has an agreement with CONNECT, powered by American Family Insurance, for auto insurance, home insurance, and umbrella insurance.

=== Costco Optical ===
Costco Optical ranks as the fifth-largest optical company in the US, as of 2015. Optometrists working at Costco locations will see patients without Costco memberships, although a membership is required to fill a prescription at the optical department.

=== Costco Travel ===
Costco Travel is a wholly owned subsidiary of Costco Wholesale and offers leisure travel to Costco members of the United States and Canada. The program offers vacation packages to the Caribbean, Europe, Florida, Hawaii, Las Vegas, Mexico, and the South Pacific.

=== Food Court ===
in 1984 Costco introduced the Food Court idea in their San Diego location just a year after the first Costco was opened (In Seattle). The Food Court originally started off as just a hotdog stand outside the store via a food cart. The cart was titled "Cafe 150" as a nod to their $1.50 hotdog that they still uphold to this day as well as the drink included with the purchase. Around the year 1993 is when Costco started diversifying their menu adding more unique and varying food and drink options for patrons. Also around that time Costco started phasing out the food cart and started turning it into an extension of their warehouses. they changed the "Cafe 150" name to just the basic label "Food Court" in which they claim it helped customers identify it and separate it from their main warehouse. Their Food Courts are typically styled as a walk up counter with multiple kiosks to order from. They serve a variety of foods and drinks such as sandwiches, chicken tenders, salads, coffee products, smoothies, and a selection of fountain drinks to choose from. Their food courts are styled in a red and white striped, casual picnicesque style with multiple benches and umbrellas. On April 8th 2024 Costco made a membership mandatory in order to purchase food and drink at their food Courts.

In a July 2024 interview, CEO Ron Vachris reiterated Costco's commitment to the US$1.50 price point for the hot dog combo and promised that the price would not rise on his watch.

In 2009, due to slow sales, the pretzel was replaced by the churro. In April 2013, Pepsi replaced all Coca-Cola fountain drinks sold at US locations because Coke had raised its prices; this helped keep the hot dog combo with soda at its original US$1.50 price; however, in late 2024, it was reported that Costco would be reverting to Coca-Cola products in early 2025. Warehouses began the transition in July 2025.

=== Costco credit card ===
On April 1, 2016, in the US, Citigroup became the exclusive issuer of Costco's branded credit cards. Before that, Costco credit cards had been issued by American Express since 2001, and Costco accepted only American Express cards for credit transactions. After switching its co-branded cards to Citi, Costco ceased accepting AmEx and began accepting Visa exclusively. AmEx cited Costco's request for lower transaction fees than AmEx was willing to grant as the reason for the split. In Canada, Costco ended its AmEx relationship in 2014, and starting in 2015, it partnered with Capital One Mastercard for branded credit cards. In 2020, Capital One announced it would be ending the partnership in late 2021. It was announced that beginning in March 2022, Costco will begin a partnership with CIBC Mastercard. Costco branded credit cards from both issuers also serve as alternate Costco membership cards, with a customized reverse side containing membership info.

=== Costco Audiobook App ===
In March 2021, Costco started selling audiobooks and launched a corresponding iOS and Android app to listen to purchases. The app is free; however, the books are exclusive to Costco members. The retailer sells audiobooks in bundles grouped by genre or author, with prices ranging from $5 to $50. Audiobooks are currently only available in the US.

== Labor relations ==
=== Employee rights ===
While some former Price Club locations in California and the northeastern United States are staffed by Teamsters, the majority of Costco locations are not unionized, although there was a drive in 2012 to unionize some locations in Canada. The Teamsters report that over 15,000 Costco employees are union members. The non-union locations have revisions to its Costco Employee Agreement every three years concurrent with union contract ratifications in locations with collective bargaining agreements. The Employee Agreement sets forth benefits, wages, disciplinary procedures, paid holidays, bonuses, and seniority. The Employee Agreement is subject to change by Costco at any time and provides no absolute protection for workers. As of June 2022, non-supervisory hourly wages ranged from $17.50 to $28.45 in the US, $16.00 to $28.70 in Canada, and £9.75 to £13.90 in the United Kingdom. In the US as of 2005, eighty-five percent of Costco's workers had health insurance, compared with less than fifty percent at Walmart and Target. Health benefits include coverage through Aetna, remote primary care through Teladoc, second opinions and clinical navigation by Grand Rounds, varieties of health insurance agencies with Custom Benefit Consultants Inc. (CBC), and wellness coaching by Omada.

In February 2021, Costco announced it would raise the starting rate for its hourly store workers in the United States to $16 an hour. Costco has been actively raising its minimum wage, starting at $14 in 2018 and increasing to $15 in 2019. They further add that 20% of their hourly employees will be subject to the minimum wage change.

A location in Norfolk, Virginia, unionized with the Teamsters in 2023. The vote in Norfolk was the first successful Costco union drive in over twenty years. In January 2025, the Teamsters union representing over 18,000 Costco employees voted to strike, demanding "fair wages and benefits".

=== Contractors ===
Costco contracts exclusively with two independent companies to provide employees for product demonstrations (e.g., food samples) at Costco stores: Club Demonstration Services (CDS) and Warehouse Demo Services (WDS). Demonstration employees receive a pay and benefit package that is less than that of Costco employees. As of August 1, 2017, demonstrations/samples are provided by CDS in Canada. Product demonstrations at Costco stores in the United States were halted in March 2020 amid the COVID-19 pandemic, with some Costco CDS employees shifted to cleaning tasks before all were laid off when CDS temporarily ceased operations the following month; they were rehired as Costco started resuming demonstrations at select stores in June 2020, with all US stores resuming demonstrations by June 2021.

== Discontinued concepts ==
=== Costco Home ===
The first Costco Home warehouse opened in December 2002, in Kirkland, Washington. The warehouse's concept was to combine the value, setting and members-only elements of Costco's warehouse clubs with the product array one would find at an upscale home store, such as Fortunoff or Crate & Barrel. The Costco Home warehouses sold furniture, housewares, kitchen products and accessories from higher-end brands such as Lexington, Ralph Lauren and Waterford Crystal in a warehouse-club setting. Like traditional Costco warehouses, Costco Home operated on a cash-and-carry basis, with on-site inventory available for immediate pickup, meaning members could collect items and take them home that same day. A second warehouse opened in 2004 in Tempe, Arizona.

On April 2, 2009, the company announced that it would be abandoning its Costco Home concept, closing the two existing stores in Kirkland, Washington and Tempe, Arizona on July 3, 2009, and abandoning plans for a third warehouse in Portland, Oregon.

=== Costco Fresh ===
A grocery-centered format, named Costco Fresh, was announced in September 1999 for a 75,000-square-foot (7,000 m^{2}) two-story space in Manhattan, New York City. The company pulled out of an agreement to build the Manhattan store later that year after cost increases and local protests. The concept was revived in late 2002 for a store in Bellevue, Washington, near its Issaquah headquarters, at a former Kmart. The new store would primarily sell fresh produce, meats, seafood, and baked goods instead of bulk items, but would also have several features from normal Costco warehouses; it would also have a modified logo, with a fruit stem growing from the first "o" in the Costco name. The concept was dropped the following year, but the company retained interest in building a normal Costco store at the Bellevue site until 2008, when it abandoned the plans due to zoning regulations that would have required daylighting an underground creek.

== Controversies ==
=== Animal welfare ===
In 2010, Mercy for Animals conducted an undercover investigation at Buckeye Veal Farm, a veal supplier to Costco. Immediately following the investigative release, Costco adopted a policy against purchasing veal from producers that use the crate-and-chain production method. The case prompted Ohio lawmakers to vote in favor of a veal crate phase-out in the state. In 2012, Mercy for Animals conducted another undercover investigation of a pork supplier to major retailers such as Costco, Walmart, Safeway, Kroger, and Kmart. Before the public release of the investigation, Costco announced it would begin requiring its pork suppliers to phase out gestation crates.

In 2015, the Humane Society of the United States conducted an undercover investigation at a Costco egg supplier. An undercover worker at Hillandale Farms, a major egg supplier to Costco, filmed conditions in which egg-laying hens lived in tiny wire cages. Following the investigations, several celebrities including Brad Pitt and Ryan Gosling publicly wrote to Costco to address this issue. In December 2015, following efforts by animal protection nonprofits including The Humane League, Costco released an updated commitment to source exclusively cage-free eggs in its operations.

In 2016, the animal rights group Direct Action Everywhere (DxE) reported cannibalism and high mortality at a cage-free Costco egg supplier. Costco denied the allegations, but the video sparked a discussion about animal welfare problems continuing to exist at cage-free egg farms. Writing in The Huffington Post, DxE co-founder Wayne Hsiung argued that the new investigation, rather than suggesting that Costco should keep birds in cages, indicated that hens should have the right not to be raised for food or kept on farms at all.

In October 2020, Costco dropped Chaokoh coconut milk over allegations of forced monkey labor. PETA accused the manufacturer, Theppadungporn Coconut Co., of using forced monkey labor, finding cruelty to monkeys at its farms and facilities. Ken Kimble, Costco's Vice President of Corporate Food and Sundries, condemned the use of monkey labor and stated that Costco launched an investigation regarding the issue and ceased purchasing from the Chaokoh supplier. Kimble also stated that Costco will continue to monitor the implementation of the harvest policies and once satisfied, will resume purchasing.

In December 2020, Costco announced plans to end the use of battery cage eggs across its worldwide operations, becoming the first US retailer to issue a global policy on the confinement of animals in its supply chain. Josh Dahmen, Costco financial planning and investor relations director, stated: "We are in the process of making that transition to cage-free eggs. We will continue to increase the percentage over time, with a goal of eventually getting to 100%."

In February 2021, an undercover investigation by Mercy for Animals showed chickens at a Costco facility in Nebraska unable to move, sitting in feces, and covered with chemical burns. New York Times opinion columnist Nicholas Kristof covered the investigation, accusing Costco of keeping prices low "in part by developing chickens that effectively are bred to suffer." In June 2022, two Costco shareholders represented by the animal rights organization Legal Impact for Chickens sued Costco executives for breach of fiduciary duty. The lawsuit claimed that the company's use of fast-growing breeds violates animal welfare laws in Nebraska and Iowa, undermining Costco's appeal to consumers. In March 2023, the lawsuit was dismissed. In July 2023, Legal Impact for Chickens filed a formal demand to Costco's board, however, the committee recommended that the board reject the demand.

=== Environmental standards ===
In May 2012, Costco agreed to pay US$3.6 million under a settlement with the Alameda County District Attorney's Office after it was found that Costco had failed to properly store and dispose of hazardous materials at its stores.

In 2014, the US Department of Justice and the United States Environmental Protection Agency alleged that Costco had failed to promptly repair leaks of the refrigerant chlorodifluoromethane from its refrigeration equipment at its stores. Costco paid a fine of US$335,000 and agreed to spend $2 million over three years to fix refrigerant leaks and make improvements at 274 stores.

Costco was criticized in 2019 by the Natural Resources Defense Council (NRDC) and SumOfUs for using virgin Canadian boreal forest to make its toilet paper. NRDC stated that over the previous twenty years, 28 million acres of Canadian boreal forest had been cut down to make toilet paper.

In August 2023, the Environment Agency of Iceland fined Costco ISK 20 million for a diesel spill originating from a gas station in Garðabær, which contaminated the Hafnarfjörður sewage system.

In May 2025, the United States Environmental Protection Agency fined Costco US$3,066,724 over the alleged distribution of unregistered pesticides and misbranded pesticide devices.

=== Labor standards ===
In 2014, The Guardian reported that Costco was a client of Charoen Pokphand Foods. Over six months, The Guardian traced down a supply chain from slave ships in Asian waters to leading producers and retailers. Costco has published a statement stating that it has had a supplier code of conduct since 1999 which does not allow this practice, and that independent auditors check for violations regularly.

In June 2023, a Costco employee in South Korea died of heatstroke while organizing shopping carts outside. South Korean government guidelines state that outdoor workers be given a 10- to 15-minute break every hour during heatwave advisories; however, these guidelines were not strictly followed or enforced at the employee's workplace. He was given 15-minute breaks every 3 hours without a regular supply of drinking water. The company was later fined ₩30 million by the Ministry of Employment and Labor.

In November 2025, California fined Costco and its delivery contractors US$868,128 for labor violations involving the misclassification of delivery drivers as independent contractors.

=== Pharmacies ===
In September 2016, Costco self-disclosed conduct to the Office of Inspector General after its pharmacy in Waltham, Massachusetts improperly altered prescription drug claims to Medicare Part D and the Massachusetts Medicaid program that resulted in higher reimbursement than was appropriate. They paid a fine of US$340,157.25. In January 2017, Costco was brought to court in the US for lax pharmacy controls in violation of the Controlled Substances Act. Allegations such as Costco "filling prescriptions that were incomplete", or were for substances "beyond various doctors' scope of practice". The case was settled after Costco paid US$11.75 million.

In 2019, the Ontario Ministry of Health fined Costco $CA7.2 million after it found that Costco pharmacies were accepting advertising services from a generic drug manufacturer in Ontario, where it is illegal for a pharmacy to accept rebates, or kickbacks, from a generic drug manufacturer in exchange for promising to stock its brand of drugs. Two Costco pharmacy directors were referred to the Ontario College of Pharmacists and were fined for the misconduct.

=== Product quality ===
In July 2015, the US Consumer Product Safety Commission recalled the EKO Sensible Eco Living Trash Can that Costco was selling because the black plastic protective collar in the opening on the back of the trash can could be dislodged, exposing a sharp edge. Costco was fined US$3.85 million for failing to notify the commission of the defect, despite receiving 92 complaints about the trash can, including 60 from people who sustained injuries.

In 2017, Costco and Acushnet Holdings sued each other over their golf balls. In 2018, Costco and Acushnet reached a settlement out of court.

In August 2017, a federal judge ordered a "deceptive" Costco to pay Tiffany & Co. US$19.4 million for misleading consumers into thinking they could buy legitimate Tiffany merchandise at warehouse club prices. The decision was vacated in the appeals court which noted that Tiffany did not prove that customers were actually misled, and the case was later settled out of court.

In September 2020, CBS News reported that Costco had stopped selling Palmetto Cheese after the owner of the pimento cheese brand called Black Lives Matter a "terror organization". Costco posted a note on the item at its Myrtle Beach location indicating it will not be reordered, and over 120 Costco locations across the US will no longer carry it.

In 2023, the Kaohsiung Department of Health fined Costco numerous times for selling bags of mixed berries imported into Taiwan that tested positive for Hepatitis A. Costco was fined NT12.5 million and temporarily barred from selling mixed berries in the country.

In July 2023, Costco Australia paid $33,000 in penalties for mislabeling the origin of lobster products. Lobsters imported from Canada were labeled as "Kirkland Signature PREVIOUSLY FROZEN WHOLE COOKED WA LOBSTER" and "Australian Lobster".

== See also ==
- Bulk foods
- Costco Guys
- Costco Wholesale Corp. v. Omega, S. A.
- Wholesaling
