= Suicide bidding =

Bidding Method

Suicide bidding is a response to a tendering exercise in which a potential supplier, anxious to win business, submits a proposal to carry out the work for less than it will cost. These procurement processes are typically modelled as reverse sealed-bid auctions with the lowest bid winning.

The motive for such bidding is to keep the company's skilled labour employed, even if the project only breaks even or makes a loss.

This can result in poor quality work, poor service and debates over loopholes in contract wording in attempts to charge clients extra, or even insolvency on the part of the contractor.

The practice has particularly been noted in construction bidding. Around 2010, suicide bidding was widespread due to the economic crisis and strong competition. 2010 survey by the Chartered Institute of Building found that 82% of respondents believed that “suicide bidding” existed within the industry. It was considered to have contributed to the financial collapse of British firms Connaught plc and Rok plc in 2010.

The Civil Engineering Contractors Association acknowledged that the practice had become "rife" in the desperate competition for work during the late-2000s recession, but blamed the public sector procurement process for focussing on the lowest price rather than best value.

Some commissioning bodies, such as Crossrail, openly discourage the practice. In 2011, some housing associations began including specific terms in tenders to protect them from legal challenge in the event of refusing to award the contract according to the lowest tender.

== See also ==
- Loss leader
