= Jeffrey Brotman =

American attorney, entrepreneur, and executive

- Born: Jeffrey Hart Brotman; September 27, 1942; Tacoma, Washington, U.S.
- Died: August 1, 2017 (aged 74); Medina, Washington, U.S.
- Education: University of Washington (BA, JD)
- Occupations: Businessman; investor; philanthropist; lawyer
- Known for: Cofounder and chairman of Costco
- Spouse: Susan Thrailkill (m. 1976)
- Children: 2

Jeffrey Hart Brotman (September 27, 1942 – August 1, 2017) was an American businessman, investor, lawyer, and philanthropist. Brotman was the cofounder and chairman of Costco Wholesale Corporation.

== Early life and education ==
Brotman was born in a Jewish family in Tacoma, Washington, the son of Pearl and Bernie Brotman. His grandparents were Jewish emigrants from the Kingdom of Romania (now Romania) to Saskatchewan; his parents immigrated to the US and settled in Tacoma. His father was an owner of Seattle Knitting Mills. Along with his uncles, he owned a chain of 18 retail stores in Washington and Oregon named Bernie's.

In 1965, the family moved to Seattle. Brotman graduated from the University of Washington in 1964 with a degree in political science and in 1967 with a J.D. He was a member of the Zeta Beta Tau fraternity at the University of Washington.

== Career ==
After college and law school, he and his brother, Michel, founded a women's jeans store named Bottoms; and in the 1980s, they founded the Jeffrey Michael chain of men's clothing stores, which they operated into the 1990s.

In 1982, Brotman cofounded Costco Wholesale Corporation with Jim Sinegal, a protégé of Sol Price, the founder of PriceSmart. He served as chairman from the company's inception until his death, except during a stretch from 1993 to 1994 when he was vice chairman. In 2017, Costco operated 736 warehouse stores.

Brotman was also an early investor in Howard Schultz's Starbucks Corporation.

== Philanthropy ==
Brotman served on the boards of several public companies and according to Businessweek magazine, was "connected to 13 board members". He sat on the board of directors of the Million-Dollar Roundtable at the United Way of King County. He also served on the boards of Seafirst Bank, Starbucks, and was a trustee at the Seattle Art Museum. He and his wife Susan donated to numerous causes, especially at the University of Washington, where they funded hundreds of student scholarships. They also endowed the Jeffrey & Susan Brotman Professorship at UW Law School, currently held by Steve Calandrillo.

== Personal life ==
Brotman married Susan Thrailkill. They had two children, Justin Brotman, who became an activist and businessman, and Amanda Brotman-Schetritt, a Barnard College graduate who works in sustainability, philanthropy, and design.

On August 1, 2017, Brotman died in Medina, Washington at the age of 74. He died in his sleep, possibly due to cardiac arrest. He was a member of Temple Beth El in Tacoma.
