= Ron Vachris =

American business executive (born 1965)

- Born: Roland Michael Vachris; 1965 (age 60–61); Staten Island, New York, U.S.
- Education: Glendale Community College (attended)
- Occupation: Business executive
- Employer: Costco
- Known for: Costco CEO
- Title: Chief executive officer
- Term: 2024–present
- Spouse: Kim (m. c. 1988)
- Children: 3

Roland Michael "Ron" Vachris (born 1965) is an American business executive and the chief executive officer of Costco. He began working for Price Club, a predecessor of Costco, as a part-time forklift driver in 1982.

== Early life ==
Vachris was born in Staten Island, New York, in 1965 and is of Greek American heritage. His father worked as a utility lineman, and the family moved to Arizona when Vachris was a teenager. After high school, he attended Glendale Community College, where he studied business. He left without completing a degree after beginning work as a part-time forklift driver at Price Club in 1982.

== Career ==
After spending several years driving a forklift, Vachris became an assistant warehouse manager in Phoenix before managing Price Club's expansion into Colorado in 1991. By 1992, Vachris managed warehouses in Aurora and Westminster. After Price Club merged with Costco in 1993, Vachris moved back to Arizona until 1999 when he became a regional vice president in San Diego.

Vachris joined Costco's corporate management in 2010, serving as a senior vice president and general manager until 2015. After seven more years in other senior executive roles, Vachris became president and chief operating officer in February 2022, working under Craig Jelinek.

On October 10, 2023, Costco announced that Jelinek would be stepping down and would be replaced by Vachris. Vachris officially became CEO of Costco on January 1, 2024. As CEO, Vachris gained attention after Costco announced it would not eliminate its diversity, equity, and inclusion policies.

== Personal life ==
Around 1988, Vachris married his wife Kim. They have two sons and a daughter.
