= W. Craig Jelinek =

American businessman (born 1952)

Walter Craig Jelinek
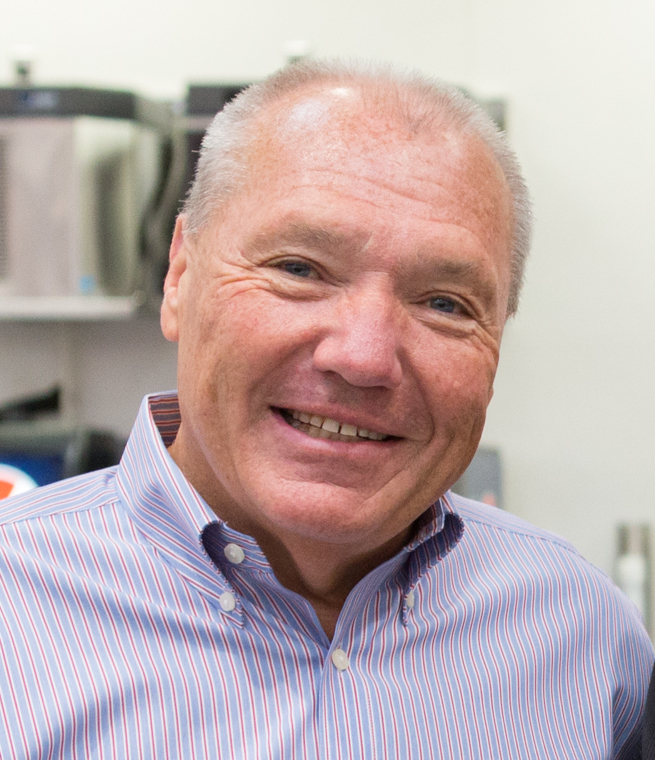
- Jelinek in 2013
- Born: August 8, 1952 (age 74); Los Angeles, California, U.S.
- Education: San Diego State University
- Occupation: Businessman
- Known for: President and CEO of Costco, 2012–2023

Walter Craig Jelinek (born August 8, 1952) is an American businessman who served as president and CEO of Costco from 2012 to 2023, when he succeeded the company's founder, James Sinegal.

== Early life ==
On August 8, 1952, Jelinek was born in Los Angeles, California to Walter Adolph Jelinek and Erdene Gordon. His father was of Czech descent (the surname is derived from Jelínek, which is common in the country). In 1970, Jelinek graduated from Antelope Valley High School.

== Education ==
In 1975, Jelinek earned a bachelor's degree from San Diego State University.

== Career ==
Jelinek began his career at FedMart, later serving as an operations manager for the company in Los Angeles. In 1981, he joined Lucky Stores.

Jelinek joined Costco as a warehouse manager in 1984 and later became manager of the company's Northwest region following the Price Club merger. He was named executive vice president of merchandising in 2004. Jelinek joined Costco's board of directors in 2010 amid speculation that he was being prepared to succeed as chief executive officer. He was named president later that year and assumed the role of CEO in 2012 following the retirement of founder James Sinegal.

Jelinek also serves on the board of Costco Wholesale UK Ltd.

In 2018, Jelinek's annual base salary was reported as $800,000 by the Puget Sound Business Journal. His base salary increased to $1,000,000 in 2020; that same year, his total compensation was $8,279,552, according to a Costco SEC filing. In 2023, Jelinek's total compensation from Costco was $16.9 million, or 336 times the company's median employee pay for that year.

In October 2023, Jelinek announced that he would step down as Costco's chief executive officer at the end of the year. He was succeeded by Ron Vachris in January 2024; Vachris had previously served as the company's chief operating officer and president. Jelinek remained on as an advisor until April 2024 and continues to serve as a member of Costco's board of directors.

== Awards ==
- 2019 Peter G. Peterson Business Statesmanship Award. Presented by Committee for Economic Development.

== See also ==
- Jeffrey Brotman
- Hamilton E. James
