= Fixed price of Coca-Cola from 1886 to 1959 =

$0.05 price of Coca-Cola

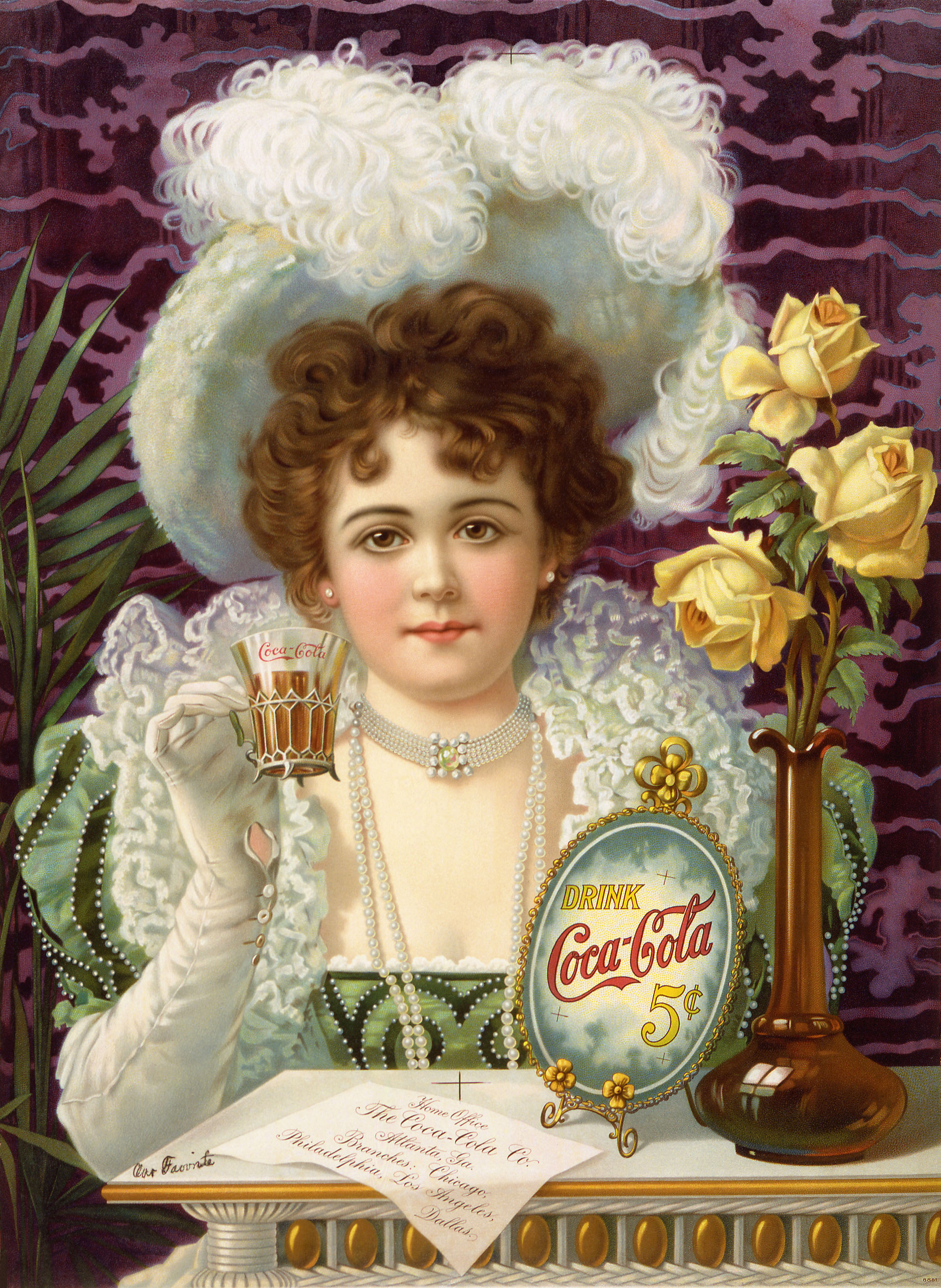
An 1890s advertising poster for five-cent Coca-Cola

From 1886 until 1959, the price of a 6.5 US fl oz (190 mL) glass or bottle of the soft drink Coca-Cola was set at five cents (or one nickel), and remained fixed with very little local fluctuation. The Coca-Cola Company was able to maintain this price for several reasons, including bottling contracts, advertisements, vending machines, and a relatively low rate of inflation (with five cents in 1886 being worth about fifteen cents in 1959, compared to five cents in 1959 being equivalent to $0.55 in 2025). The price of the drink remained the same for over seventy years, including during the founding of Pepsi, World War I, the Prohibition Era, the Great Depression, and World War II, despite executives at the Coca-Cola Company desiring to raise their prices. In the 1950s, the fixed price was gradually phased out, and local prices increased to between six and ten cents.

== The beginning ==
In 1886, Dr. John Stith Pemberton, a pharmacist and former Confederate soldier, produced the first Coca-Cola syrup. On May 8, 1886, he brought a jug of his syrup to a local pharmacy on Peachtree Road in Atlanta, Georgia. According to the Coca-Cola Company's self-published history, "The Chronicle of Coca-Cola," "It was pronounced 'excellent' and placed on sale for five cents a glass" (equivalent to $1.79 in 2025). Although most soda fountain drinks cost seven or eight cents at the time (for a 6.5 oz glass), Coca-Cola chose five cents and specifically marketed itself as an affordable option. Pemberton sold his remaining stake in Coca-Cola to Asa Candler in 1888.

== Bottling contracts ==
In 1899, Benjamin Thomas and Joseph Whitehead, two lawyers from Chattanooga, Tennessee, approached Coca-Cola President Asa Candler about buying Coca-Cola bottling rights. At the time, soda fountains were the predominant way of consuming carbonated beverages in the United States. Candler sold the rights to the two lawyers for one dollar, which he never ended up collecting. It is speculated that Candler sold the bottling rights so cheaply because he (a) truthfully thought bottling would never take off, and (b) was granted the ability in the contract to "pull their franchise if they ever sold an inferior product".

== Advertising ==
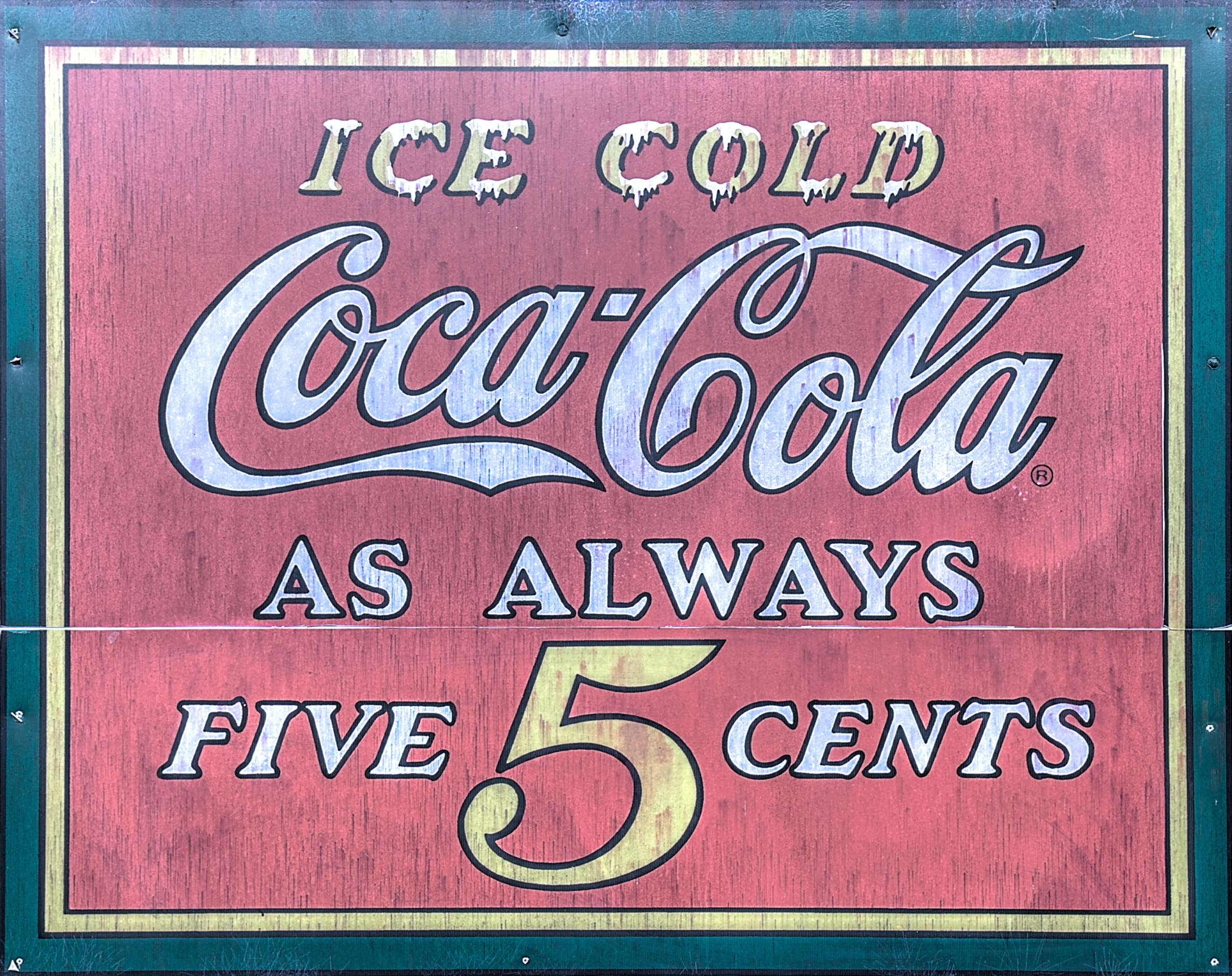
5 cent Coca-Cola sign on display at Dauset Trails Nature Center

Although Candler predicted differently, bottling did indeed become popular (surpassing fountain sales in 1928); the non-expiring contract meant that Coca-Cola had to sell their syrup for a fixed price. That meant Coca-Cola's profits could be maximized only by maximizing the amount of product sold and that meant minimizing the price to the consumer. Toward this end, Coca-Cola began an aggressive marketing campaign to associate their product with the five-cent price tag, providing incentive for retailers to sell at that price even though a higher price at a lower volume might have made them more profit otherwise. The campaign proved successful, and bottlers did not increase prices. Coca-Cola was able to renegotiate the bottling contract in 1921. However, in part because of the costs of rebranding (changing all of their advertisements as well as the psychological associations among consumers) the price of Coca-Cola remained at five cents until the late 1950s (equivalent to $0.55 in 2025).

== Vending machines ==
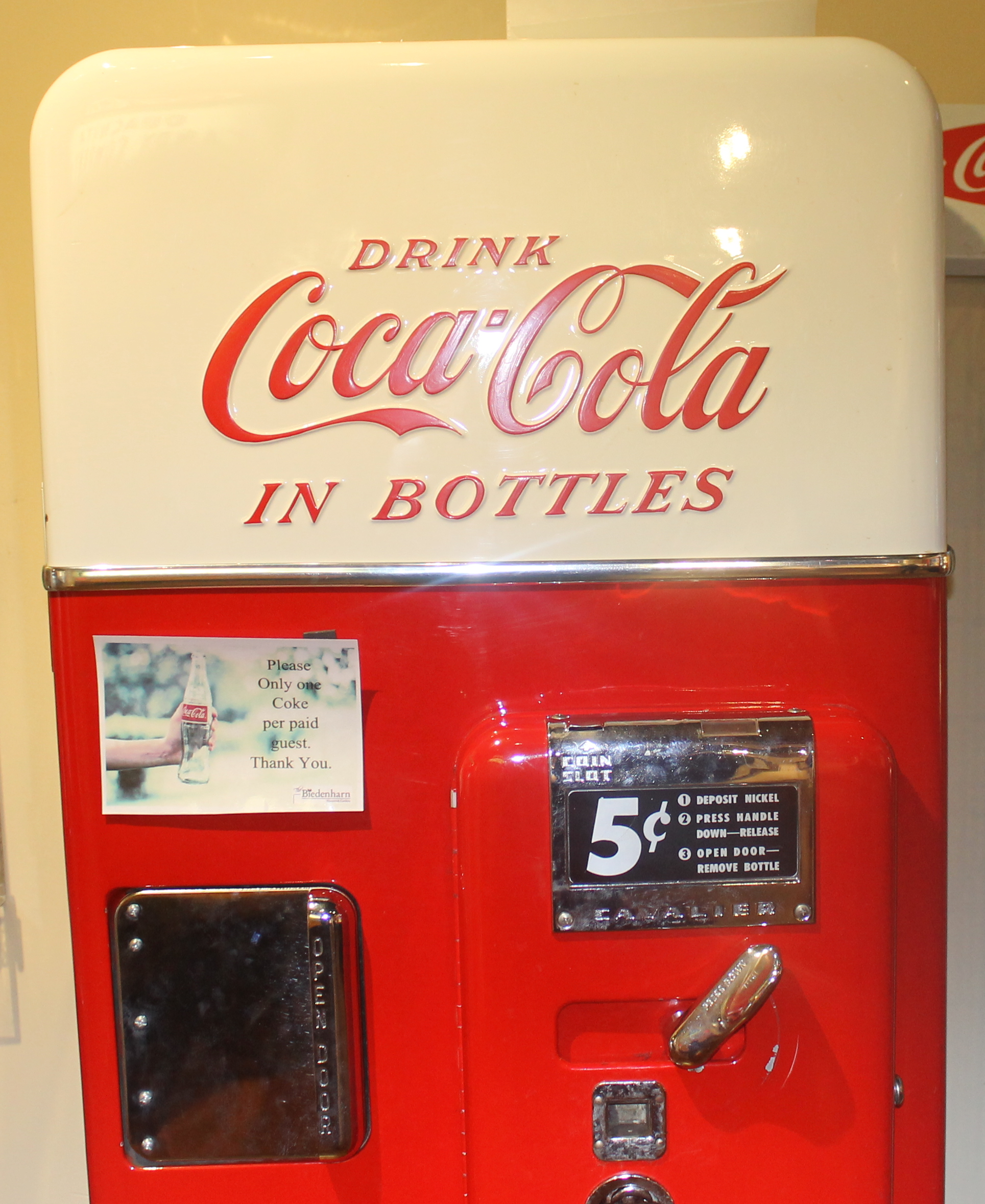
An early Coca-Cola vending machine

Another reason the price of Coca-Cola remained fixed at five cents, even after 1921, was the prevalence of vending machines. In 1950, Coca-Cola owned over 85% of the 460,000 vending machines in the United States. Based on vending machine prices at the time, Levy and Young estimated the value (in 1992 dollars) of these vending machines at between $286 million and $900 million.

Because existing Coca-Cola vending machines could not reliably make change, customers needed to have exact change. The Coca-Cola company feared that requiring multiple coins (e.g., six pennies or one nickel and one penny for six-cent Coke) would reduce sales and cost money to implement, among other things. Reluctant to double the price to a dime – the next price achievable with a single coin – they were forced to keep the price of Coca-Cola at five cents, or seek more creative methods. This constraint played a role into the 1950s, when vending machines began to reliably make change.

== Attempts to raise prices ==
The Coca-Cola Company sought ways to increase the five cent price, even approaching the U.S. Treasury Department in 1953 to ask that they mint a 7.5 cent coin. The Treasury was unsympathetic. In another attempt, Coca-Cola briefly planned a strategy where one in every nine vending machine bottles was empty. The empty bottle was called an "official blank". This meant that, while most nickels inserted in a vending machine would yield a beverage, one in nine patrons would have to insert two nickels in order to get a full bottle. This effectively would have raised the price to 5.625 cents. Coca-Cola never implemented this strategy.

== The end of the practice ==
Inflation (CPI) in the United States

Throughout its history, the price of Coca-Cola had been especially sticky, but in the 1940s, inflation in the United States had begun to accelerate, making nickel-priced Coke unsustainable. As early as 1950, Time reported Coca-Cola prices went up to six cents. In 1951, Coca-Cola stopped placing "five cents" on new advertising material, and Forbes magazine reported on the "groggy" price of Coca-Cola. After Coca-Cola president Robert Woodruff's plan to mint a 7.5 cent coin failed, Business Weekly reported Coke prices as high as six, seven and ten cents around the country. By 1959, the last of the nickel bottles had been sold.
