= James Sinegal =

American businessman

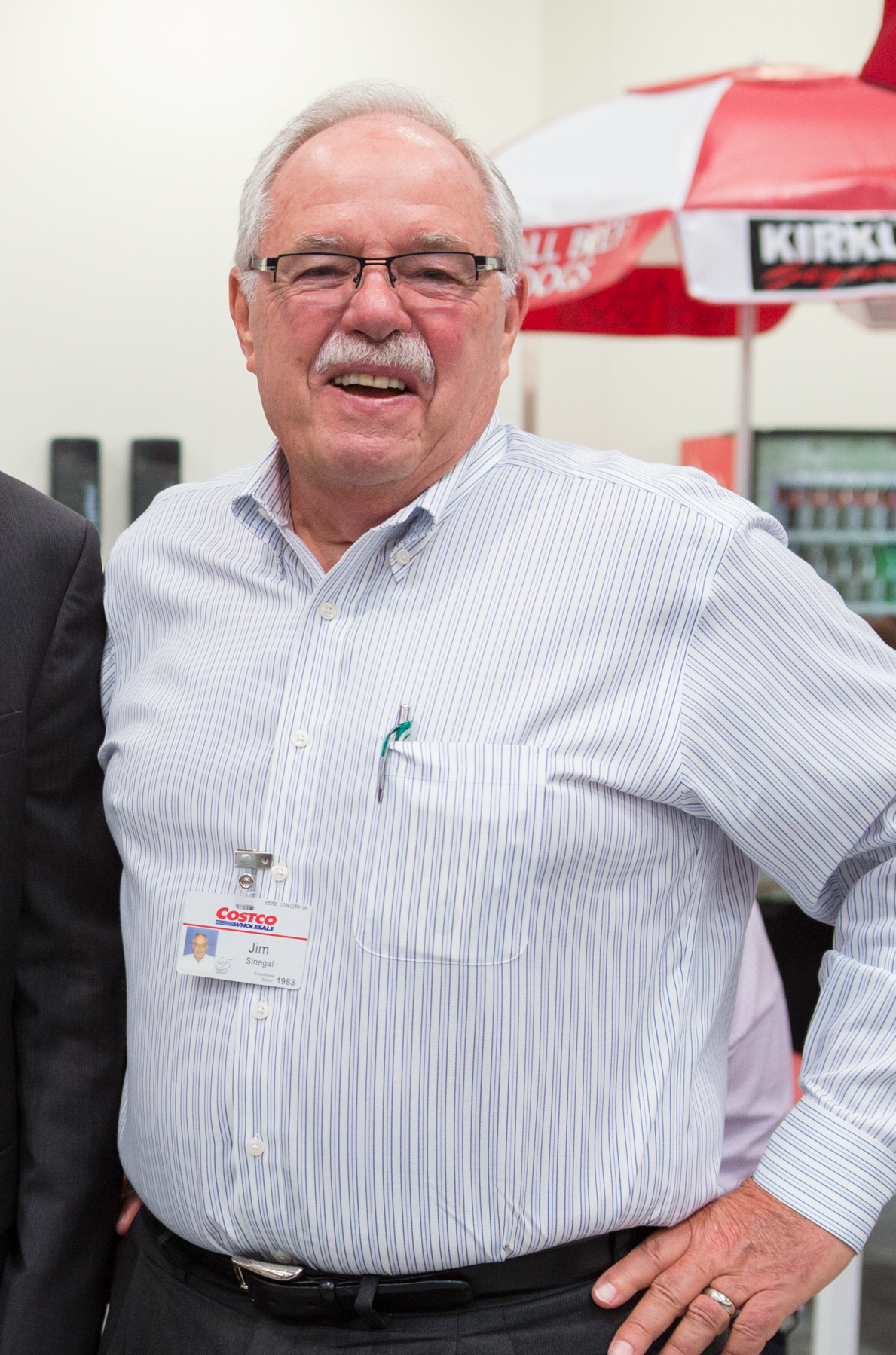
- James Sinegal in 2013
- Born: James D. Sinegal; January 1, 1936 (age 90); Pittsburgh, Pennsylvania, U.S.
- Education: San Diego City College (AA); San Diego State University (BA); Central Catholic High School (Pittsburgh)
- Occupations: Retired businessman and retail executive
- Known for: Co-founder and former CEO of Costco
- Successor: W. Craig Jelinek
- Spouse: Janet Sinegal
- Children: 3

James D. Sinegal (born January 1, 1936) is an American businessman, co-founder and former CEO of the Costco Wholesale Corporation, an international retail chain. He served as Costco's president and CEO from 1983 until 2011. As CEO of Costco, Sinegal was known for his hands-on humanitarian approach to business. He prioritized customer and employee satisfaction over shareholder interests and is also known for his philanthropic efforts.

== Early life and education ==
James D. Sinegal was born on January 1, 1936 into a Catholic working-class family in Pittsburgh, Pennsylvania. He attended St. Lawrence O'Toole primary school, Central Catholic High School (Pittsburgh), and Helix High School in La Mesa, California, and he earned an AA at San Diego City College in 1955. He attended San Diego State University, graduating with a Bachelor of Arts degree in 1959.

== Career ==
After Sinegal started as a grocery bagger at FedMart in 1955, he discovered that he loved the retail industry, and he was excited by the opportunities at this rapidly growing retailer. At FedMart, he worked his way up to executive vice president in charge of merchandising and operations. He was a vice president of merchandising for Builders Emporium from 1977 to 1978 and an executive vice president for the Price Company from 1978 to 1979. From 1979 to 1983, he worked with Sinegal/Chamberlin and Associates, a company that acted as a broker and sales representative for food and nonfood products.

Together with Seattle retailer Jeff Brotman, he co-founded Costco. From 1983 until his retirement in 2011, Sinegal served as Costco's president and CEO. As CEO, Sinegal was well known for traveling to each Costco location every year to inspect it personally. Sinegal's innovations made Costco the first "warehouse club" to include fresh food, eye-care clinics, pharmacies, and gas stations in its mix of goods and services.

Sinegal was a protégé of Sol Price, widely considered to be the "father" of the "warehouse club" concept. Most if not all of Sinegal's business philosophy can be attributed to Price; Sinegal has said that he "learned everything" from Price. Sinegal is known for a benevolent style of management rooted in the belief that employees who are treated well will in turn treat and serve customers well. Sinegal, through Costco, provided his employees — at every level of the company, including the stores — compensation and benefits that are much higher than retail industry norms. For example, over 90% of Costco employees qualify for employer-sponsored health insurance; the US retail industry average is just under 60%. As a result, Costco has one of the lowest employee turnover rates in retail. In 2006, Costco's turnover rate was 17% overall and 6% after one year of employment.

In 1993, when growing competition threatened both Price Club and Costco Wholesale, Sinegal was invited to a partial merger. The two companies entered into a partial merger just after Price's earnings dropped by 40%. The new company, named PriceCostco, Inc., focused heavily on international expansion, opening stores in Mexico, South Korea and England. Despite best efforts to recover losses, sales continued to drop. Robert Price and James Sinegal had different opinions regarding company direction and recovery policies. A breakup between the companies was formally announced in 1994. Price's breakaway company was named as Price Enterprises. Sinegal still continued to manage PriceCostco, Inc.

In 1997, the name of Sinegal's company was changed to Costco Wholesale.

In an interview published in the Houston Chronicle on July 17, 2005, he told Steven Greenhouse that he did not care about Wall Street analysts who had criticized him for putting good treatment of employees and customers ahead of pleasing shareholders. Investors might want higher earnings, but Sinegal stated, "We want to build a company that will still be here 50 and 60 years from now." A favorite quote attributed to Sinegal, in part about his philosophy on dealing with success, is "You have to take the shit with the sugar". Investors who bought $10,000 of Costco stock in 1992 found it worth $43,564 just 10 years later — a return of 354% (15.855%, annually). From 1985, when Costco went public, to 2020, the company's stock value increased 19,000%.

In 2009, Sinegal was named a TopGun CEO by Brendan Wood International, an advisory agency.

== Retirement ==
On January 1, 2012, Sinegal retired as CEO of Costco Wholesale, continued to serve as Company Advisor and Director, and was succeeded by his long-term Costco colleague W. Craig Jelinek in 2012. Sinegal retired from the Board of Directors in January 2018.

== Personal life ==
In 2008, Sinegal was part of an eleventh-hour local ownership group that committed to invest $450 million ($150 million from each of the three co-owners) for the renovation of Seattle's KeyArena, and to purchase the NBA's Seattle SuperSonics franchise. The bid failed, however, as NBA commissioner David Stern had already made a private deal with an Oklahoma-based ownership group to move the team to Oklahoma City (where it was renamed the Oklahoma City Thunder).

Sinegal and his wife, Janet, have three children. Sinegal's son David owns and operates the Sinegal Estate Winery in St. Helena, California.

Sinegal is a staunch Democrat and spoke at the 2012 Democratic National Convention. Sinegal has hosted President Barack Obama at his home on two occasions.

Sinegal received an honorary doctorate from Dartmouth College alongside Jake Tapper and others in June 2017.
