= Slotting fee =

Fees charged for supply chain participation or retail space allocation

A slotting fee, slotting allowance, pay-to-stay, or fixed trade spending is a fee charged to produce companies or manufacturers by supermarket distributors (retailers) in order to have their product placed on their shelves or within their supply chain. The fee varies greatly depending on the product, manufacturer, and market conditions. For a new product, the initial slotting fee may be approximately US$25,000 per item in a regional cluster of stores, but may be as high as US$250,000 in high-demand markets.

In addition to slotting fees, retailers may also charge promotional, advertising and stocking fees. According to a Federal Trade Commission study, the practice is "widespread" in the supermarket industry. Many grocers earn more profit from agreeing to carry a manufacturer's product than they do from actually selling the product to retail consumers. Fees may serve to efficiently allocate scarce retail shelf space, help balance the risk of new product failure between manufacturers and retailers, help manufacturers signal private information about potential success of new products, and serve to widen retail distribution for manufacturers by mitigating retail competition. For vendors, slotting fees may be a move by the grocery industry to profit at their suppliers' expense.

Some companies argue that slotting fees are unethical as they create a barrier to entry for smaller businesses that do not have the cash flow to compete with large companies. The use of slotting fees can, in some instances, lead to abuse by retailers such as in the case where a bakery firm was asked for a six figure fee to carry its items for a specific period with no guarantee its products would be carried in future periods.

The same practice is also common in major bookstore chains in the US, dating from as far back as the mid-nineties.
