= List of people from the Bronx =

This is a list of people who were either born or have lived in the Bronx, a borough of New York City, at some time in their lives. Many of the early historical figures lived in that part of Westchester County which later became part of the Bronx.

== Academics and science ==
- Richard Alba (1942–2025) – Distinguished CCNY Professor of ethnicity and assimilation
- Jill Bargonetti (born 1962) – biologist and Presidential Early Career Award winner
- Marshall Berman (1940–2013) – philosopher of modernity; author of All That Is Solid Melts into Air
- Norman Birnbaum (1926–2019) – author, educator, political advisor; University Professor Emeritus, Georgetown University Law Center; taught at Amherst College, London School of Economics, Oxford University, University of Strasbourg
- Ira Black (1941–2006) – neuroscientist and stem-cell researcher; first director of the Stem Cell Institute of New Jersey
- Xavier Briggs (born 1968) – former professor of planning at MIT, former associate director of Office of Management and Budget, former vice president of Ford Foundation; sometimes known as "Xavier de Souza Briggs"
- Roscoe Brown (1922–2016) – Tuskegee airman, exercise physiologist, president, Bronx Community College, New York City political adviser
- Charles DeLisi (born 1941) – Arthur Metcalf Professor of Science and Engineering, Boston University; dean emeritus, College of Engineering
- Morton Deutsch (1920–2017) – conflict resolution expert
- W.E.B. Du Bois (1868–1963) – sociologist, historian, civil rights activist, Pan-Africanist
- Gertrude B. Elion (1918–1999) – Nobel Prize biochemist and pharmacologist
- Murray Gell-Mann (1929–2019) – Nobel Prize physicist of sub-atomic particle
- Todd Gitlin (1943–2022) – sociologist; co-founder of Students for a Democratic Society
- Fred Greenstein (1930–2018) – political scientist who psychologically assessed U.S. presidents
- Henry Heimlich (1920–2016) – physician inventor of the Heimlich maneuver
- Matthew Henson (1866–1955) – explorer, co-discoverer of the North Pole (with Robert Peary)
- Gary Hermalyn (born 1953) – Centennial Historian of New York City, Edgar Allan Poe scholar
- Irving Howe (1920–1993) – literary critic, socialist writer, author of World of Our Fathers
- Samuel P. Huntington (1927–2008) – Government Professor at Harvard University; co-editor of Foreign Policy; author of political science works related to the modernization of societies, particularly those of developing nations
- Adrian Kantrowitz (1918–2008) – cardiac-surgery pioneer
- Arthur Kantrowitz (1913–2008) – nose cone physicist; co-inventor of the intra-aortic balloon pump
- Jeffrey Lane – urban ethnographer, Rutgers University
- Robert Lefkowitz (born 1943) – 2012 recipient of Nobel prize for chemistry of protein receptors
- Howard Lesnick (1931–2020) – Jefferson B. Fordham Professor of Law, University of Pennsylvania Law School
- Paul Levinson (born 1947) – science-fiction and non-fiction author; communications professor
- Norman Levitt (1943–2009) – mathematician at Rutgers University
- Ronald Mallett (born 1945) – theoretical physicist of time travel
- Barry Mazur (born 1937) – mathematician and fellow of the National Academy of Sciences
- Joseph M. McShane (born 1949) – Jesuit priest; president of Fordham University
- Stanley Milgram (1933–1984) – psychologist known for obedience to authority and small world studies
- Joseph A. O'Hare (1931–2020) – Jesuit priest; longest-serving president of Fordham University (1984–2003); first chair of New York City Campaign Finance Board (1988–2003)
- Jay Pasachoff (1943–2022) – astronomer, umbraphile
- Carolyn Porco (born 1953) – planetary scientist; leader of the Cassini space observatory team at the Colorado Space Science Institute, studying Saturn
- Allan Pred (1936–2007) – geographer at University of Chicago and University of California, Berkeley
- Howard Raiffa (1924–2016) – economist; negotiation scientist
- Murray Rothbard (1926–1995) – economist; helped define modern libertarianism
- Ken Schaffer (born 1947) – inventor; invented the wireless guitar system, video placeshifting
- Joseph Francis Shea (1925–1999) – aerospace engineer; headed NASA's Apollo program
- Robert Sobel (1931–1999) – historian and writer; history professor at Hofstra University; writer of business histories
- Edward Soja (1940–2015) – postmodern political geography and urban theorist at UCLA
- Michael I. Sovern (1931–2020) – Chancellor Kent Professor of Law and president emeritus of Columbia University
- Robert Spinrad (1932–2009) – computer designer; director of the Xerox Palo Alto Research Center
- Mark Steiner (1942–2020) – professor of philosophy of mathematics and physics at the Hebrew University of Jerusalem
- Leonard Susskind (born 1940) – theoretical physicist
- Neil deGrasse Tyson (born 1958) – astrophysicist; director of the American Museum of Natural History's Hayden Planetarium; host of PBS's educational-television series NOVA scienceNOW and Cosmos: A SpaceTime Odyssey (2014) and Cosmos: Possible Worlds (2020)
- Lloyd Ultan (born 1938) – official historian of the Bronx
- Allen Weinstein (1937–2015) – historian; Archivist of the United States
- Barry Wellman (1942–2024) – sociologist; University of Toronto professor studying social networks, community and the Internet
- Rosalyn Sussman Yalow (1921–2011) – medical physicist; co-winner of the 1977 Nobel Prize in Physiology or Medicine
- Yosef Hayim Yerushalmi (1932–2009) – historian; Salo Baron Professor of Jewish history at Columbia University

== Arts ==
=== Architects ===
- Vito Acconci (1940–2017) – architect, landscape architect and installation artist
- Horace Ginsbern (1902–1987) – architect; designed the landmark Art Deco Park Plaza Apartments on Jerome Avenue in the Bronx, and other New York City structures
- Daniel Libeskind (born 1946) – architect

=== Filmmakers ===
- Stanley Kubrick (1928–1999) – film director, screenwriter, editor, cinematographer, storyteller
- Gerard Malanga (born 1943) – filmmaker, poet, photographer, actor, curator and archivist

=== Photographers ===
- Robert Altman (1944–2021) – photographer
- Richard Avedon (1923–2004) – photographer
- Alvin Baltrop (1948–2004) – photographer
- Margaret Bourke-White (1904–1971) – photographer (including documentary photographer)
- Ron Galella (1931–2022) – paparazzo photographer
- Garry Gross (1937–2010) – fashion photographer (including nude images of Brooke Shields at age ten), dog portraiture photographer and dog trainer
- Marcey Jacobson (1911–2009) – photographer; images of daily life in Chiapas, Mexico
- Joel Meyerowitz (born 1938) – photographer
- Ralph Morse (1917–2015) – photographer
- Phil Stern (1919–2014) – photographer in Hollywood, WWII and the White House
- Raven B. Varona (born 1990) – photographer

=== Visual artists and designers ===
- Vito Acconci (1940–2017) – architect, landscape architect and installation artist
- Bernard Bernstein (1928–2021) metalsmith, silversmith and teacher
- Willie Cole (born 1955) – visual artist; uses found material such as his "America" blackboard
- Cope2 (born 1968) – graffiti artist
- Ralph Fasanella (1914–1997) – painter
- Milton Glaser (1929–2020) – graphic designer; designer of the "I Love New York" logo
- Al Held (1928–2005) – abstract painter; associated with Abstract expressionism, Hard-edge and Color Field painting
- Sabin Howard (born 1963) – figurative sculptor, noted for U.S. World War I national monument
- Joel Iskowitz (born 1946) – illustrator, artist, designer for United States Mint
- C. Paul Jennewein (1890–1978) – sculptor
- Ivan Karp (1926–2012) – art dealer
- Ronnie Landfield (born 1947) – abstract painter; associated with lyrical abstraction, and color field painting
- Glenn Ligon (born 1960) – conceptual artist
- Whitfield Lovell (born 1959) – contemporary visual artist, painter, and installation artist; focuses on African-American themes; MacArthur Fellow (2007)
- Jules Maidoff (1933–2025) – artist, teacher and founder of Studio Art Centers International, Florence, Italy
- Rick Meyerowitz (born 1943) – illustrator, writer
- Piccirilli Brothers (including father, Giuseppe Piccirilli (1844–1910), and his six sons – Ferruccio (1864–1945), Attilio (1866–1945), Furio (1868–1949), Masaniello (1870–1951), Orazio (1872–1954) and Getulio (1874–1956)) – sculptors
- Larry Rivers (1923–2002) – painter
- Joel Arthur Rosenthal (born 1943) – jeweler
- Merryll Saylan (born 1936) – woodturner
- Edwin Scheier (1910–2008) – artist
- George Sugarman (1912–1999) – sculptor
- Lawrence Weiner (1942–2021) – artist; associated with conceptual art
- Marian Zazeela (1940–2024) – light artist, painter, and set designer; also musician of Hindustani classical music

=== Journalists and writers ===
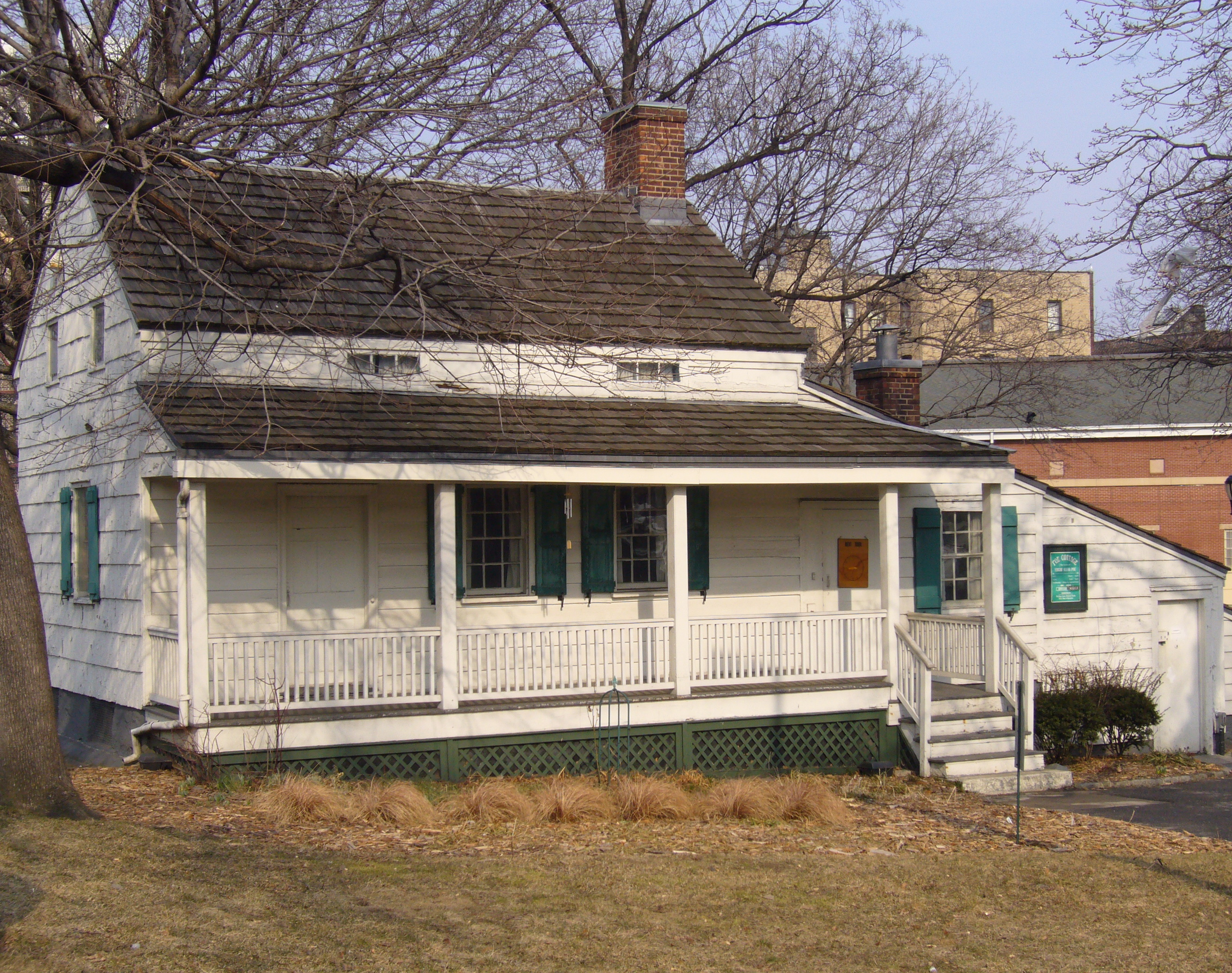
Edgar Allan Poe Cottage 2640 Grand Concourse, in the Fordham section of the Bronx. Poe spent the last few years of his life there.

- Sholem Aleichem (1859–1916) – author
- William Henry Appleton (1814–1899) – publisher
- Army Archerd (1922–1999) – columnist for Variety
- James Baldwin (1924–1987) – playwright and essayist
- Harold Bloom (1930–2019) – literary critic
- Leslie Brody (born 1952) – non-fiction author
- Robert Caro (born 1935) – non-fiction author of biographies of Robert Moses and Lyndon Johnson
- Jerome Charyn (born 1937) – prolific novelist and author of several memoirs
- Mary Higgins Clark (1927–2020) – best-selling author of suspense novels
- Avery Corman (born 1935) – novelist; author of The Old Neighborhood, set in the Bronx
- Don DeLillo (born 1936) – novelist
- E. L. Doctorow (1931–2015) – author
- Will Eisner (1917–2005) – author of A Contract with God and other graphic novels and instruction books
- Jules Feiffer (1929–2025) – cartoonist (primarily in The Village Voice); playwright, screenwriter
- Bill Finger (1917–1974) – writer, co-creator of Batman comic book
- Vivian Gornick (born 1935) – critic, journalist, essayist, and memoirist
- Marilyn Hacker (born 1942) – poet, critic, reviewer
- Phil Hall (born 1964) – film critic
- Hy Hollinger (1918–2015) – journalist for Variety and The Hollywood Reporter
- Max Kadushin (1895–1980) – rabbi, theologian and author at Conservative Synagogue Adath Israel of Riverdale
- Bel Kaufman (1911–2014) – novelist author of Up the Down Staircase about NYC schools in the 1950s
- William Melvin Kelley (1937–2017) – novelist, short-story writer, university professor
- Mark Lane (1927–2016) – author, attorney, researcher
- Annie Lanzillotto (born 1963) – poet, author, dramatist, songwriter
- Stan Lee (1922–2018) – leading creator of Marvel Comics
- Paul Levinson (born 1947) – science fiction and non-fiction author
- Anthony Lewis (1927–2013) – New York Times legal reporter, specializing in coverage of the U.S. Supreme Court
- Miles Marshall Lewis (born 1970) – pop-culture critic
- Eleazar Lipsky (1911–1993) – lawyer, novelist, playwright, president of the Jewish Telegraphic Agency
- Kenneth Lonergan (born 1962) – playwright and screenwriter
- Lynda Lopez (born 1971) – journalist, multiple broadcast networks
- Ray Marcano – medical reporter and music critic
- John Matteson (born 1961) – Pulitzer Prize–winning biographer
- Richard Mauer (1949–2026) – investigative journalist
- Judith Merril (1923–1997) – science-fiction editor and author
- Steve Mirsky – Scientific American columnist
- Nicholasa Mohr (born 1938) – Nuyorican writer about Puerto Rican women in New York
- Mwalim (born 1968) – playwright, composer, and novelist
- Davi Napoleon (born 1946) – theater historian and arts journalist
- Clifford Odets (1906–1963) – playwright, co-founder of the Group Theatre
- Cynthia Ozick (born 1928) – award-winning novelist and short-story writer
- Grace Paley (1922–2007) – award-winning short-story writer
- Michael Pearson (born 1949) – Old Dominion University English professor and author of several books, including his memoir, Dreaming of Columbus: A Boyhood in the Bronx
- David J. Pecker (born 1951) – CEO of American Media, publisher of National Enquirer, US Weekly, Men's Fitness
- Edgar Allan Poe (1809–1849) – author and poet
- Chaim Potok (1929–2002) – author
- Richard Price (born 1949) – novelist and screenwriter
- Chris Regan (born 1967) – television writer and author
- Spider Robinson (born 1948) – science-fiction writer of novels and short stories
- Joanna Russ (1937–2011) – feminist science-fiction writer
- Oliver Sacks (1933–2015) – neurologist and author
- Douglas Sadownick (born 1959) – gay fiction writer, journalist and psychotherapist
- William Safire (1929–2009) – journalist, speech writer, literary stylist
- Tony Santiago (born 1950) – military historian
- William Steig (1907–2003) – cartoonist and author
- Mark Twain (1835–1910) – author
- Dorothy Uhnak (1930–2006) – mystery writer who drew upon her past experience as a NYPD detective
- Al Wasserman (1921–2005) – documentary filmmaker
- Ben Wattenberg (1933–2015) – political/demographic analysis author (The Real Majority)
- Gene Weingarten (born 1951) – Pulitzer Prize-winning journalist, author and cartoonist
- Herman Wouk (1915–2019) – author

=== Film, television, radio, dance and theatre ===
- Charlie Ahearn (born 1951) – film director of Wild Style
- Danny Aiello (1933–2019) – actor
- Alan Alda (born 1936) – actor
- Nancy Allen (born 1950) – actress
- Woody Allen (born 1935) – film director and actor
- June Allyson (1917–2006) – actress
- Bruce Altman (born 1955) – actor
- Christopher Aponte – ballet dancer and choreographer
- Arthur Aviles (born 1963) – dancer and choreographer
- Emanuel Azenberg (born 1934) – theatrical producer
- Lauren Bacall (1924–2014) – actress
- Martin Balsam (1919–1996) – film actor
- Anne Bancroft (1931–2005) – actress
- Ellen Barkin (born 1954) – actress
- Peter S. Beagle (born 1939) – fantasy and science fiction author
- Tyson Beckford (born 1970) – model and actor
- Ahmed Best (born 1973) – actor, Jar Jar Binks
- Joey Bishop (1918–2007) – entertainer
- Irving Brecher (1914–2008) – radio, television and film comedy writer
- Martin Brest (born 1951) – film director, producer, and writer
- Joy Bryant (born 1974) – actress
- Cara Buono (born 1971) – actress
- Red Buttons (1919–2006) – comedian and actor
- James Caan (1940–2022) – actor
- Steven Canals (born 1980) – television screenwriter and producer
- George Carlin (1937–2008) – comedian
- Eddie Carmel, born Oded Ha-Carmeili (1936–1972) – Israeli-born entertainer with gigantism and acromegaly, popularly known as "The Jewish Giant"
- Kai Cenat (born 2001) – online streamer and internet personality
- Paddy Chayefsky (1923–1981) – screenwriter
- Dominic Chianese (born 1931) – actor
- Sanford "Sandy" Climan (born 1956) – film producer
- Lee J. Cobb (1911–1976) – actor
- Kevin Corrigan (born 1969) – actor
- Tony Curtis (1925–2010) – actor
- Stacey Dash (born 1967) – actress
- Michael DeLorenzo (born 1959) – actor
- Desus (born 1983) – comedian, former host of Viceland's Desus and Mero and current host of Showtime's Desus & Mero
- Richard Dubin (born 1945) – television writer, director and producer
- Peter Falk (1927–2011) – actor
- Jon Favreau (born 1966) – film and television director and actor
- Joe Franklin (1926–2015) – TV host of Joe Franklin's Memory Lane
- Cuba Gooding, Jr. (born 1968) – actor
- Howard Gottfried (1923–2017) – film producer of Network and The Hospital
- Don Gregory (1934–2015) – Broadway theatrical producer
- Mortimer Halpern (1909–2006) – Broadway stage manager
- Jonathan Harris (1914–2002) – actor
- Moss Hart (1904–1961) – playwright and theatre director
- Amy Heckerling (born 1954) – film director
- Bernard Herrmann (1911–1975) – film composer
- Richard Hunt (1951–1992) – Muppet puppeteer
- Jharrel Jerome (born 1997) – actor
- Steven Keats (1945–1994) – actor
- The Kid Mero (born 1983) – comedian, former host of Viceland's Desus and Mero and current host of Showtime's Desus & Mero
- Robert Klein (born 1942) – comedian
- Yaphet Kotto (1939–2021) – actor
- Stanley Kubrick (1928–1999) – film director
- Saul Landau (1936–2013) – documentary filmmaker, journalist
- Annie Lanzillotto (born 1963) – actor, performance artist, director
- Tom Leykis (born 1956/1957) – radio host
- Hal Linden (born 1931) – actor, director, and musician
- Lindsay Lohan (born 1986) – actress
- Louis Lombardi (born 1968) – actor
- Domenick Lombardozzi (born 1976) – actor
- Kenneth Lonergan (born 1962) – screenwriter, director, playwright
- Jennifer Lopez (born 1969) – singer, actress and dancer
- Linda Lovelace (1949–2002) – porn actor and anti-porn activist
- Melissa Manchester (born 1951) – singer
- Sonia Manzano (born 1950) – actress, Maria Figueroa Rodriguez on Sesame Street
- Garry Marshall (1934–2016) – television and film director
- Penny Marshall (1943–2018) – actor and director
- Bernard McGuirk (1957–2022) – radio personality
- Lea Michele (born 1986) – actor
- Sal Mineo (1939–1976) – actor
- Tracy Morgan (born 1968) – actor and comedian
- Romeo Muller (1928–1992) – television writer
- Robert Mulligan (1925–2008) – film director
- Jan Murray (1916–2006) – comedian
- Mwalim (born 1968) – playwright, actor, director; spoken-word artist; co-founder of the Urban Expressionists Lab
- Bess Myerson (1924–2014) – actor; best known as first Jewish Miss America
- Carroll O'Connor (1924–2001) – actor
- Okwui Okpokwasili (born 1972) – dancer, actor
- Jerry Orbach (1935–2004) – actor
- Toby Orenstein (born 1937) – founder and director of the Columbia Center for Theatrical Arts, the Young Columbians, and Toby's Dinner Theatre
- Ronnie Ortiz-Magro (born 1985) – participant on MTV's reality-television series Jersey Shore
- Al Pacino (born 1940) – actor
- Chazz Palminteri (born 1952) – actor
- Vincent Pastore (1946–2026) – actor
- Ron Perlman (born 1950) – film actor, Hellboy
- Regis Philbin (1931–2020) – media personality and television talk-show host
- Carl Reiner (1922–2020) – comedian and film director
- Rob Reiner (1947–2025) – actor and film director
- Kristina Reyes (born 1994) – actress and bass guitarist
- Martin Richards (1932–2012) – theater and movie producer
- Martin Ritt (1914–1990) – Academy Award-nominated movie director
- Tanya Roberts (1949–2021) – actor
- Leon Robinson (born 1962) – actor
- Géza Röhrig (born 1967) – poet and film star of Son of Saul
- George Romero (1940–2017) – horror film director
- Saoirse Ronan (born 1994) – film actor
- Andre Royo (born 1968) – actor
- Harmony Santana – transgender film actres, Gun Hill Road
- Mike Savage (born 1942) – radio talk-show host
- Robert Schimmel (1950–2010) – comedian
- Daniel Schorr (1918–2010) – journalist
- Ben Schwartz (born 1981) – actor and comedian
- John Patrick Shanley (born 1950) – playwright
- Maggie Siff (born 1974) – actor
- Neil Simon (1927–2018) – playwright and screenwriter
- Wesley Snipes (born 1962) – actor
- Peter Sohn (born 1977) – animated film director and voice actor at Pixar
- Danielle Spencer (1965–2025) – actress
- Lionel Stander (1908–1994) – actor
- Arnold Stang (1918–2009) – actor
- Joseph Stein (1912–2010) – playwright
- Renée Taylor (born 1933) – actress
- Rachel Ticotin (born 1958) – actress
- Tony Vitale (born 1964) – film writer, producer and director
- Kerry Washington (born 1977) – actress
- Douglas Watt (1914–2009) – theater critic
- Fred Weintraub (1928–2017) – founder and impresario of the Bitter End 1960s hippie club; producer of movies about Woodstock, Bruce Lee
- Tacarra Williams – comedian and actress
- Burt Wolf (born 1938) – travel reporter and writer for CNN and ABC networks
- Malik Yoba (born 1967) – actor

=== Music ===
- Miguel Angel Amadeo – Latin musician-composer and owner of Casa Amadeo music store
- Anthony Amato (1920–2011) – founder and director of Amato Opera
- Aventura (born 1996) – bachata music group
- B-Lovee (born 2000) – rapper
- Afrika Bambaataa (1957–2026) – disc jockey
- The Barry Sisters – Yiddish-American singers from the 1930s to 1970s
- The Belmonts – late 1950s singing group, with Dion
- Jellybean Benitez (born 1957) – music producer credited with discovering Madonna
- Big Bank Hank (1956–2014) – old school rapper member of the Sugarhill Gang
- Big Pun (1971–2000) – rapper
- Mary J. Blige (born 1971) – singer and songwriter
- Angela Bofill (1954–2024) – R&B singer and songwriter
- A Boogie wit da Hoodie (born 1995) – rapper
- Busy Bee Starski (born 1962) – old-school rapper from the 1980s
- Jerry Calliste Jr (born 1965) – music-industry executive
- Richard Camacho (born 1997) – vocalist, founding member of CNCO
- Cardi B (born 1992) – hip-hop recording artist
- Diahann Carroll (1935–2019) – actress and singer
- The Chiffons – early 1960s girl group
- Cheryl "Coko" Clemons (born 1970) – gospel singer and lead singer of R&B group
- Cold Crush Brothers – rap group
- Willie Colón (born 1950) – trombonist
- Sean Combs (born 1969) – "Puff Diddy", rapper, singer, record producer, entrepreneur
- Judy Craig (born 1946) – lead singer of the Chiffons
- Bobby Darin (1936–1973) – 1950s–1960s singer
- Dennis Day (1916–1988) – comedian and singer; regular on Jack Benny radio and television programs
- Kat DeLuna (born 1987) – 1950s–1960s singer
- Diamond D (born 1968) – hip-hop artist
- Dion DiMucci (born 1939) – singer-songwriter; 1950s–1960s rock singer
- DJ Chuck Chillout (born 1962) – disc jockey
- DJ Kool Herc (born 1955) – hip hop pioneer
- Dr. Buzzard's Original Savannah Band – 1970s disco group
- Drag On (born 1980) – rapper
- DreamDoll (born 1992) – rapper
- Arnold Eidus (1922–2013) – concert violinist and session musician
- Fat Joe (born 1970) – rapper
- Charles Fox (born 1940) – Grammy-winning composer
- Ace Frehley (1951–2025) – Kiss guitarist
- Kay Flock (born 2003) – rapper
- French Montana (born 1984) – rapper
- Ross "The Boss" Friedman (born 1954) – guitarist and founding member of The Dictators and Manowar
- Funkmaster Flex (born 1968) – disc jockey
- Funky Four Plus One – rap group
- Furious Five – rap group
- Bob Gaudio (born 1942) – Four Seasons principal songwriter and group member
- Stan Getz (1927–1991) – jazz musician
- Richard Goode (born 1943) – classical pianist
- Eydie Gormé (1931–2013) – traditional pop singer
- Grand Mixer DXT – disc jockey
- Grand Wizard Theodore (born 1963) – disc jockey
- Grandmaster Flash (born 1958) – disc jockey
- Cory Gunz (born 1987) – rapper
- Aaron Hall (born 1964) – R&B singer-songwriter
- Andre "Dr. Jeckyll" Harrell (1960–2020) – half of rap duo Dr. Jeckyll & Mr. Hyde
- Richie Havens (1941–2013) – musician
- Heatmakerz – hip-hop producers
- Hell Rell (born 1979) – rapper
- Rita Houston (1961–2020) – disc jockey, producer, and program director of The Whole Wide World
- Bobby Hutcherson (1941–2016) – jazz vibraphonist who lived in the Bronx in the 1960s
- Ice Spice (born 2000) – singer-songwriter
- Inspectah Deck (born 1970) – rapper; member of Wu-Tang Clan
- The Jaynetts (1961–1964) – singers, "Sally Go Round the Roses"
- Jazzy Five – rap group
- Billy Joel (born 1949) – singer
- Jim Jones (born 1976) – rapper, actor
- Helen Kane (1903–1966) – singer
- Kid Capri (born 1967) – disc jockey and producer
- Don Kirshner (1934–2011) – 1950s–1960s rock producer, 1970s television: Rock Concert
- Jann Klose – singer
- Kool Keith (born 1963) – hip-hop artist
- Joey Kramer (born 1950) – drummer for Aerosmith
- KRS-One (born 1965) – rapper
- La India (born 1969) – "the "princess of salsa"
- Kenneth Lampl (born 1964) – composer and lecturer
- Héctor Lavoe (1946–1993) – salsa singer
- Tom Lehrer (1928–2025) – satirical songwriter and performer
- Lil Tjay (born 2001) – rapper
- Cuban Link (born 1974) – hip-hop artist
- Lord Finesse (born 1970) – hip-hop artist
- Lord Tariq and Peter Gunz – hip-hop duo
- Leanne "Lelee" Lyons (born 1973) – member of R&B group SWV
- Richard "Handsome Dick" Manitoba (born 1954) – singer, The Dictators, MC5 and Manitoba's Wild Kingdom; entertainer; radio DJ; saloon keeper
- Johnny Marks (1909–1985) – composer of "Rudolph the Red-Nosed Reindeer" and other songs
- Anthony McGill (born 1979) – principal clarinetist of New York Philharmonic
- Abel Meeropol (1903–1986) – composer of "Strange Fruit", "The House I Live In"; adoptive father of Rosenberg boys
- Melle Mel (born 1961) – rapper
- Alan Merrill (1951–2020) – musician, singer, actor, model
- Helen Merrill (born 1929) – jazz singer
- Robert Moog (1934–2005) – inventor of the Moog synthesizer
- Jerry Moss (1935–2023) – co-founder of A&M Records; owner of Zenyatta race horse
- Chris Moy (born 1992) – member of Menudo
- Mwalim (born 1968) – singer, pianist, composer, arranger, producer
- Nice & Smooth – rap duo
- Nine (born 1969) – rapper
- Laura Nyro (1947–1997) – composer and singer
- Jon Oliva (born 1960) – heavy-metal singer
- Adelina Patti (1843–1919) – opera singer
- Jan Peerce (1904–1984) – opera singer
- Murray Perahia (born 1947) – pianist and conductor
- Roberta Peters (1930–2017) – opera singer
- Positive K (born 1967) – rapper
- Tony Powers (born 1938) – actor, singer-songwriter, video artist
- Prince Royce (born 1989) – bachata singer-songwriter
- Tito Puente (1923–2000) – jazz musician
- Rahzel (born 1964) – rapper, beatboxer
- Christopher "Kid" Reid (born 1964) – half of Kid 'n Play
- Remy Ma (born 1980) – rapper
- Jamar Rogers (born 1982) – singer
- Arlen Roth (born 1952) – guitarist, "master of the Telecaster"
- Sadat X (born 1968) – rapper; member of Brand Nubian
- Bobby Sanabria (born 1957) – drummer, percussionist, composer, arranger, bandleader
- Lenny Santos (born 1979) – bachata producer, guitarist and songwriter
- Max Santos (born 1982) – bass player, rapper
- Romeo Santos (born 1981) – singer, bachata
- Gil Scott-Heron (1949–2011) – "godfather of rap"
- Sha EK (born 2003) – rapper
- Showbiz and A.G. – hip-hop duo
- Carly Simon (born 1943) – singer-songwriter
- Joanna Simon (1936–2022) – mezzo-soprano opera singer; MacNeil/Lehrer News Hour arts correspondent; older sister of Carly Simon and Lucy Simon
- Lucy Simon (1940–2022) – composer and older sister of Carly Simon
- Slick Rick (born 1965) – rapper
- Soulsonic Force – rap group
- Joey Spampinato (born 1948) – musician
- Phil Spector (1939–2021) – composer and arranger; murderer
- Regina Spektor (born 1980) – singer-songwriter
- Donna Stark (1948–2023) – country singer-songwriter
- Maxine Sullivan (1911–1987) – jazz singer
- Ron Suno (born 2000) – rapper
- Swizz Beatz (born 1978) – record producer/rapper
- T La Rock (born 1961) – rapper
- Ray Tabano (born 1946) – former guitarist and founding member of Aerosmith
- Tim Dog (1967–2013) – rapper
- Arturo Toscanini (1867–1957) – cellist, conductor
- Doris Troy (1937–2004) – R&B singer and songwriter
- Richard Tucker (1913–1975) – operatic tenor, cantor, Temple Adath Israel
- Steven Tyler (born 1948) – frontman of Aerosmith
- Ultramagnetic MCs – rap group
- Dave Valentin (1952–2017) – Latin jazz flutist
- Luther Vandross (1951–2005) – singer
- Mario Vazquez (born 1977) – singer
- Veronica Vazquez (born 1974) – singer
- Louie Vega (born 1965) – disc jockey and music producer
- Jesse West (born 1967) – rapper, producer
- Christopher Williams (born 1967) – singer
- Peter Wolf (born 1946) – lead singer of The J. Geils Band
- Nanette Workman (born 1945) – singer-songwriter; backing vocalist for Rolling Stones, Elton John, John Lennon

== Government and politics ==
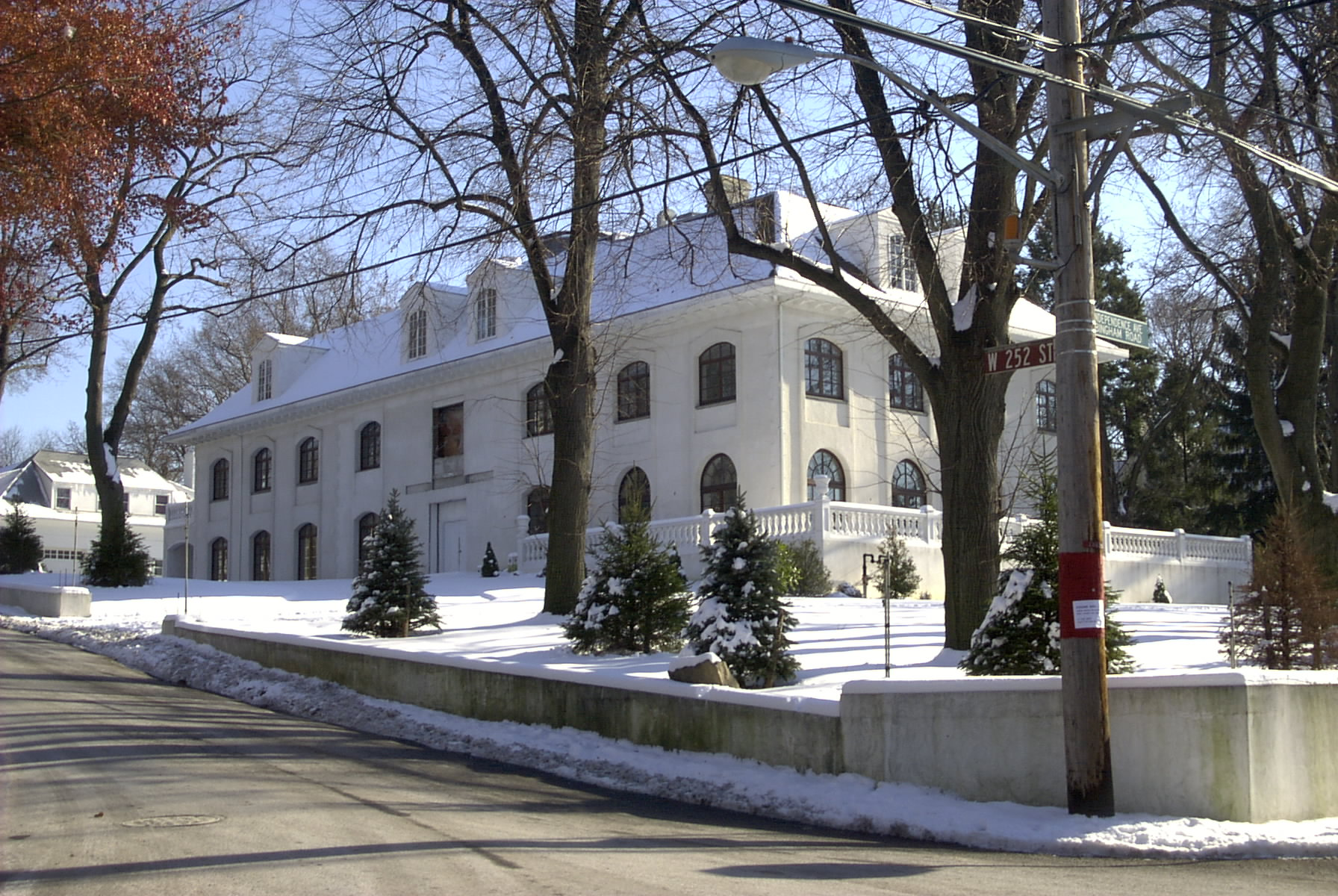
JFK House 5040 Independence Avenue. The house where John F. Kennedy lived when he was a student at Riverdale Country School from 1927 through 1930. This house is located at 5040 Independence Avenue, across the street from Wave Hill.

- Robert Abrams (born 1938) – assemblyman, Bronx borough president, New York state attorney general
- Bella Abzug (1920–1998) – congresswoman and international feminist leader
- Herman Badillo (1929–2014) – former New York City housing official, Bronx borough president, congressman and CUNY board of trustees chair
- Oxiris Barbot (born 1965/1966) – commissioner of Health of the City of New York
- Mario Biaggi (1917–2015) – decorated policeman and US congressman
- Adolfo Carrión, Jr. (born 1961) – former Bronx borough president appointed by President Barack Obama to be director of the White House Office of Urban Affairs
- Darcel Clark (born 1962) – first female Bronx County district attorney
- Gray Davis (born 1942) – former governor of California
- Rubén Díaz Jr. (born 1973) – Bronx borough president and former New York State assembly member
- Adriano Espaillat (born 1954) – U.S. representative and former New York state senator and New York state assembly member
- Louis Farrakhan (born 1933) – Black Muslim leader
- Lawrence P. Flynn (1931–2017) – Adjutant General of New York
- Luis A. Gonzalez – first Latino to be named presiding justice of the New York State Appellate Division, First Judicial Department
- Alan Grayson (born 1958) – Democratic congressman, Florida
- Michael Greco – United States marshal for the Southern District of New York
- Eric Holder (born 1951) – first African American-appointed United States attorney general
- Scott Israel (born 1956/1957) – police chief of Opa-locka, Florida, former sheriff of Broward County
- Martin Jezer (1940–2005) – progressive activist in New York and Vermont; leader of stutterers' self-help movement
- Lazarus Joseph (1891–1966) – NY state senator and New York City comptroller
- Benjamin Kaplan (1911–2010) – law professor, judge, crafter of Nuremberg Trials indictments
- John F. Kennedy (1917–1963) – 35th president of the United States; U.S. senator from Massachusetts (born in Brookline, Massachusetts)
- Bernard Kerik (1955–2025) – former commissioner of Police and of Corrections, New York City
- Ed Koch (1924–2013) – politician; former U.S. representative who became a three-term mayor of New York City
- Kenneth Kronberg (1948–2007) – leading member of LaRouche Movement
- Fiorello H. La Guardia (1882–1947) – former mayor of New York City
- Nita Lowey (1937–2025) – congresswoman 1989–2021 whose Westchester district once included parts of the Bronx and Queens
- Beatrice Lumpkin (1918–2026) – union organizer
- Norman Marcus – former general counsel, New York City Planning Commission
- Francis W. Martin (1878–1947) – first Bronx County district attorney
- Garry McCarthy (born 1959) – chief of police of Willow Springs, Illinois; former superintendent of the Chicago Police Department; 2019 candidate for mayor of Chicago
- Gouverneur Morris (1752–1816) – revolutionary war statesman
- Michael Mukasey (born 1941) – former U.S. judge and U.S. attorney general (under George W. Bush)
- Alexandria Ocasio-Cortez (born 1989) – youngest woman ever elected to the U.S. House of Representatives, 2018
- Colin Powell (1937–2021) – former United States secretary of state
- Anthony Romero (born 1965) – executive director of the American Civil Liberties Union
- Theodore Roosevelt (1858–1919) – U.S. president who spent boyhood summers at Wave Hill in the Riverdale section of the Bronx
- Larry Sharpe (born 1968) – 2018 Libertarian nominee for governor of New York; 2016 Libertarian vice-presidential candidate
- Sonia Sotomayor (born 1954) – federal appeals court judge, New York; appointed by President Barack Obama to the Supreme Court of the United States
- Eliot Spitzer (born 1959) – politician and television talk-show host; former New York state attorney general (1999–2006); governor of New York (2007–2008)
- John Timoney (1948–2016) – Philadelphia police commissioner; Miami police chief; New York City deputy police commissioner
- Ritchie Torres (born 1988) – U.S. representative and New York City councilor
- Leon Trotsky (1879–1940) – Soviet revolutionary and political theorist
- Charles J. Urstadt (1928–2020) – gubernatorial advisor and appointee noted for development of Battery Park City and as namesake of contentious Urstadt Law

== Sports ==
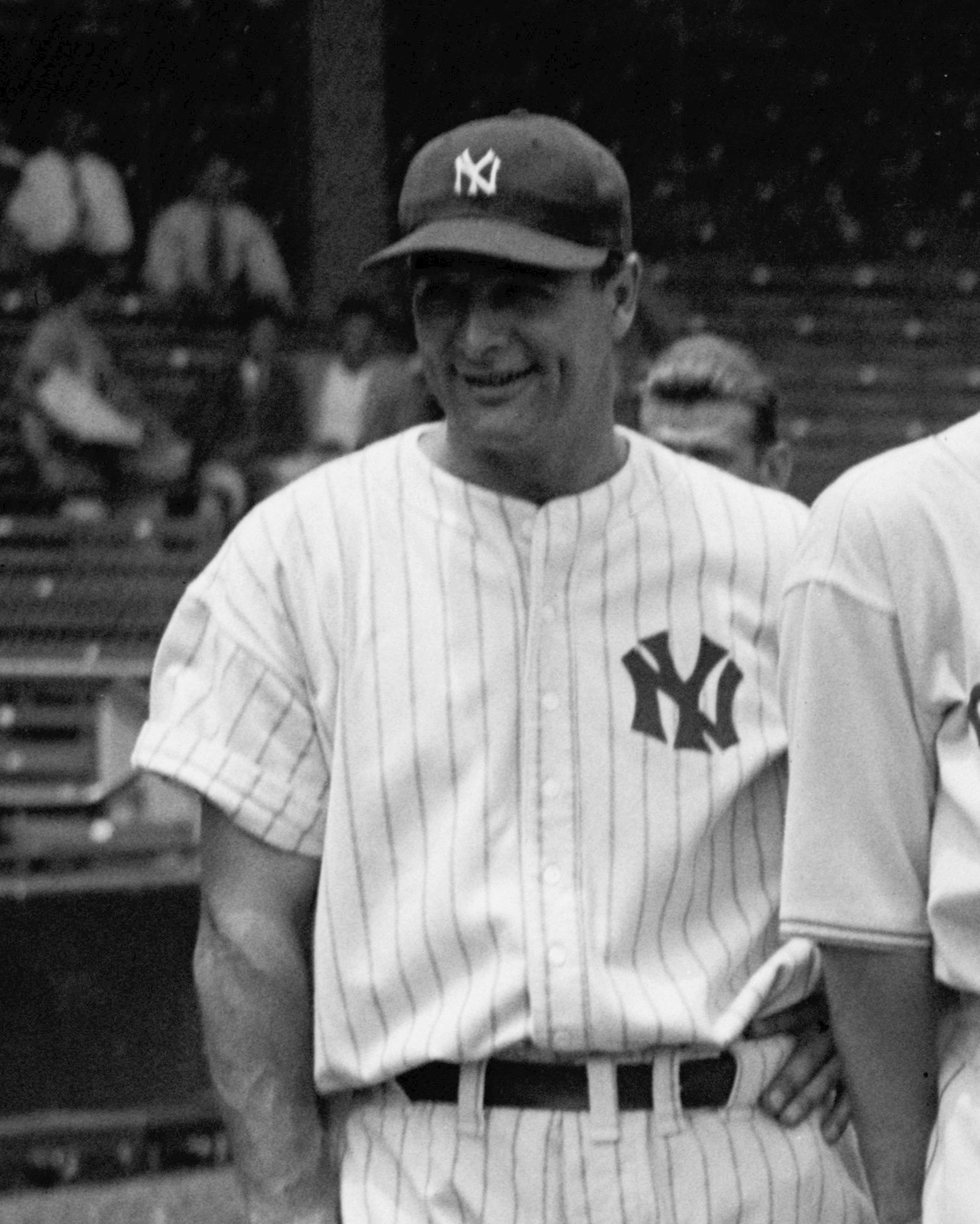
Lou Gehrig, Hall of Famer

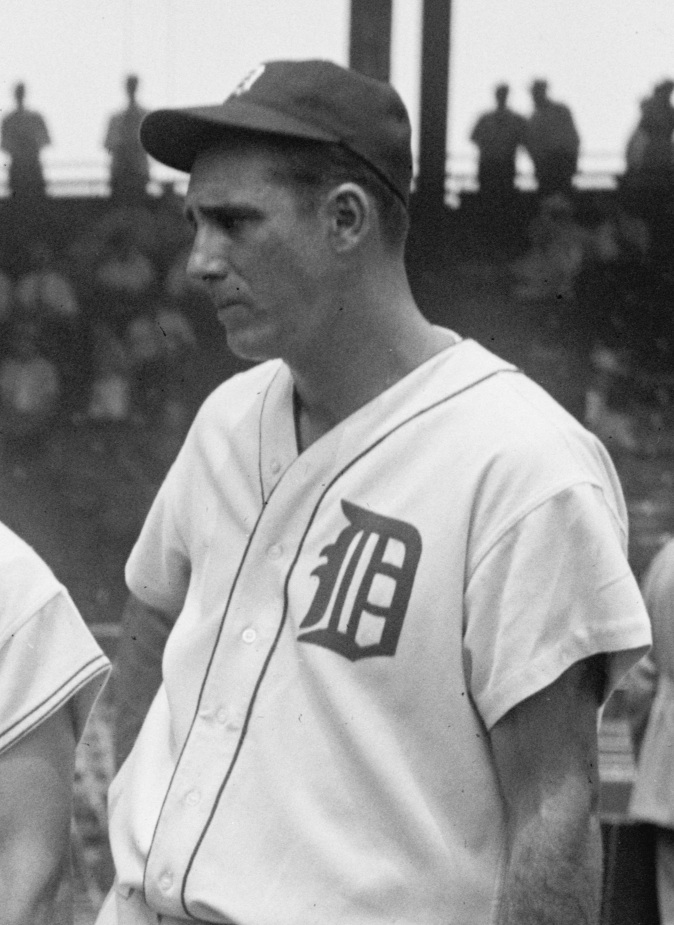
Hank Greenberg, Hall of Famer and two-time MVP

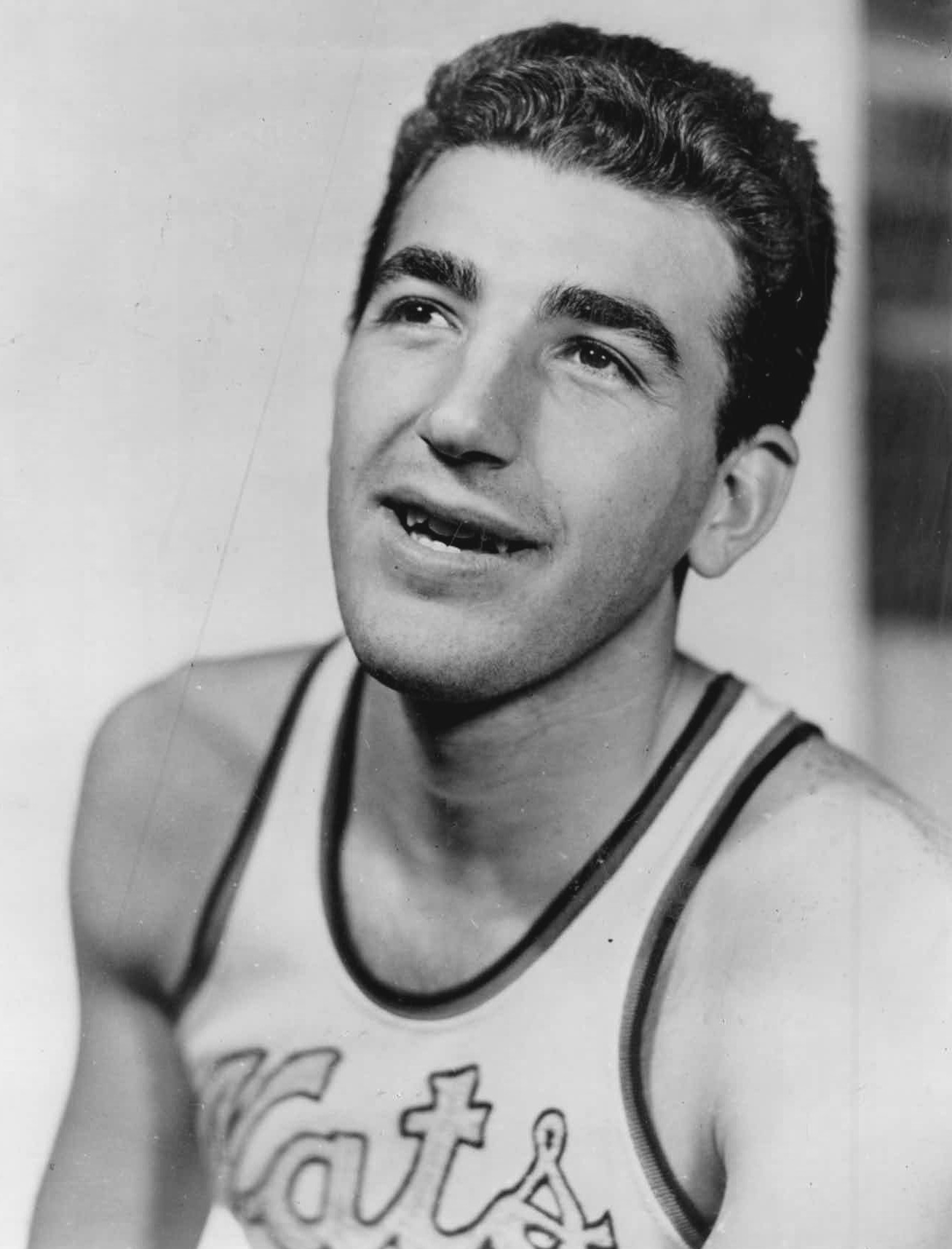
Dolph Schayes, Hall of Famer

- Nate Archibald (born 1948) – former NBA player
- Chris Armas (born 1972) – soccer player
- Albert Axelrod (1921–2004) – Olympic medalist foil fencer
- Elías Larry Ayuso (born 1977) – professional basketball player and Olympian
- Harrison Bader (born 1994) – MLB outfielder
- Margaret Bailes (born 1951) – Olympic gold medalist
- Iran Barkley (born 1960) – boxer
- Saquon Barkley (born 1997) – NFL player, 2018 NFL Offensive Rookie of the Year
- Arun Basuljevic (born 1995) – soccer player
- Ronnie Belliard (born 1975) – former MLB player
- Bobby Bonilla (born 1963) – former MLB player
- Tom Byer (born 1960) – soccer player, coach, and writer
- Willie Cager (1942–2023) – player on 1966 Texas Western University NCAA basketball championship team
- Rod Carew (born 1945) – Baseball Hall of Famer signed by the Minnesota Twins in the Bronx
- Lou Cioffi (born 1957) – soccer player
- Rocky Colavito (1933–2024) – former MLB player
- Willie Colon (born 1983) – former NFL player
- Cus D'Amato (1908–1985) – boxing manager
- Aaron Davis (born 1967) – boxer
- Bizunesh Deba (born 1987) – marathoner
- Art Donovan (1924–2013) – former NFL football tackle
- Mike "SuperJew" Epstein (born 1943) – MLB first baseman
- Chris Eubank (born 1966) – boxer
- Harry Feldman (1919–1962) – former MLB pitcher
- Frankie Frisch (1897–1973) – former MLB player
- Lou Gehrig (1903–1941) – Baseball Hall of Famer and New York Yankees first baseman
- Marty Glickman (1917–2001) – athlete and sports announcer
- Mitch Green (born 1957) – boxer
- Hank Greenberg (1911–1986) – MLB Hall of Famer
- Paul Heyman (born 1965) – WWE manager
- John Holland (born 1988) – American-Puerto Rican basketball player for Hapoel Tel Aviv of the Israeli Basketball Premier League
- Nat Holman (1896–1995) – Hall of Fame basketball player and coach
- Eric Holtz (born 1965) – Head Coach of the Israel national baseball team
- Daryl Homer (born 1990) – Olympic fencer
- Jay Horwitz (born 1945) – New York Mets executive
- Clint Hurtt (born 1978) – NFL defensive line coach
- Jonathan Isaac (born 1997) – basketball player, Orlando Magic forward
- Cullen Jones (born 1984) – swimmer
- Michael Kay (born 1961) – sports broadcaster
- Max Kellerman (born 1973) – sports-radio host
- Ed Kranepool (1944–2024) – former Major League Baseball player; New York Mets
- Marie Kruckel (1924–2012) – All-American Girls Professional Baseball League player
- Jake LaMotta (1922–2017) – boxer
- Barry Leibowitz (born 1945) – American-Israeli basketball player in the American Basketball Association and the Israeli Basketball Premier League
- Fred Lewis (born 1947) – American-handball player
- Anibal Lopez (born 1942) – bodybuilder
- Frank Malzone (1930–2015) – former MLB player
- Doug Marrone (born 1964) – NFL coach
- Floyd Mayweather Sr. (born 1952) – boxing trainer
- Shep Messing (born 1949) – Olympic soccer goalkeeper and current broadcaster
- Nat Militzok (1923–2009) – basketball player
- Marvin Miller (1917–2012) – founder, Major League Baseball Players Association
- Davey Moore (1959–1988) – WBA world middleweight champion boxer
- Mike Nagy (born 1948) – former MLB player
- Bernard Opper (1915–2000) – All-American basketball player for the Kentucky Wildcats and professional player
- John Orozco (born 1992) – champion gymnast, 2012 Olympian
- Justin Pierce (1975–2000) – skateboarder
- Ed Pinckney (born 1963) – basketball player, Villanova Wildcats Championship Team; 13-year NBA; lead assistant coach, Minnesota Timberwolves
- Bill Polian (born 1942) – NFL executive
- Damian Priest (born 1982) – WWE Wrestler of Puerto Rican descent; former WWE United States Champion; currently a leader of The Judgment Day
- Alex Ramos (born 1961) – boxer
- Tubby Raskin (1902–1981) – basketball player and coach
- T. J. Rivera (born 1988) – New York Mets infielder
- Michele A. Roberts (born 1956) – executive director of NBA players' union
- Lennie Rosenbluth (1933–2022) – basketball player
- Dolph Schayes (1928–2015) – Hall of Fame NBA basketball player and coach
- Babe Scheuer (1913–1997) – football player
- Vin Scully (1927–2022) – sportscaster
- Amanda Serrano (born 1988) – IBF Female World Super Featherweight champion boxer
- Nevil Shed (born 1943) – player on 1966 Texas Western University NCAA basketball championship team
- Stephen A. Smith (born 1967) – commentator, ESPN First Take
- Benjamin (Benji) Ungar (born 1986) – fencer
- Andrew Velazquez (born 1994) – MLB infielder
- Kemba Walker (born 1990) – basketball player; New York Knicks point guard
- Hilton White (1933–1990) – basketball coach and community leader

== Name givers ==
- Anne Hutchinson (1591–1643) – pioneer religious liberation
- Thomas Pell (1608–1669) – physician

== Activists ==
- Murray Bookchin (1921–2006) – anarchist, social ecologist, libertarian socialist
- Roscoe Brown (1922–2016) – Tuskegee Airman, president
- Stokely Carmichael (1941–1998) – Student Nonviolent Coordinating Committee leader in the 1960s U.S. Civil Rights Movement
- Majora Carter (born 1966) – MacArthur Genius Award-winning founder of Sustainable South Bronx
- Claudette Colvin (1939–2026) – first person to be arrested protesting bus segregation in the U.S. South, in Montgomery, Alabama, March 2, 1955
- Harry Fleischman (1914–2004) – socialist activist and writer
- Ita Ford (1940–1980) – Maryknoll nun, murdered by Salvadoran death squad
- Jack Greenberg (1924–2016) – civil rights lawyer as head of NAACP Legal Defense and Education Fund for 23 years
- Ray McGovern (born 1939) – retired Central Intelligence Agency officer turned political activist
- Maurice Paprin (1920–2005) – Mitchell Lama apartments developer and social activist
- Arlyn Phoenix (born 1944) – head of River Phoenix Center for Peacebuilding; mother of Joaquin Phoenix, River Phoenix
- Sally Regenhard (born 1946) – 9/11 activist; Co-op City resident
- Sylvia Rivera (1951–2002) – transgender activist, "the Rosa Parks of the transgender movement"
- Stephen Spiro (1939–2007) – conscientious objector and Vietnam War opponent
- Jim Steyer (born 1956) – child advocate
- Elizabeth Lyttleton Sturz (1917–2010) – founder of Argus Community and Harbor House; folklorist with husband Alan Lomax

== Business ==
- Joseph Beninati (born 1964) – real estate developer and private equity investor
- Chris Bianco – chef, born in the Bronx
- Lloyd Blankfein (born 1954) – businessman; chief executive officer of Goldman Sachs (since 2006)
- Eli Broad (1933–2021) – businessman and arts philanthropist; co-founder of Kaufman & Broad
- B. Gerald Cantor (1916–1996) – businessman; co-founder of securities firm Cantor Fitzgerald; with his wife Iris, amassed and then donated the largest private collection of sculptures by Auguste Rodin
- Stanley Chais (1926–2010) – investment advisor in the Madoff investment scandal
- Fred DeLuca (1947–2015) – founder and CEO of Subway fast food sandwich chain
- Millard "Mickey" Drexler" (born 1944) – businessman; chief executive officer of J. Crew; former chief executive officer of the Gap
- Reggie Fils-Aimé (born 1961) – president of Nintendo of America
- Michael J. Freeman (born 1947) – inventor, educator, business consultant, and entrepreneur
- Harry Helmsley (1909–1997) – real estate magnate in New York City
- Roger Hertog (born 1941) – co-founder of investment firm; co-publisher of The New Republic magazine; philanthropist
- Richard March Hoe (1812–1886) – inventor of rotary printing press
- Collis Potter Huntington (1821–1900) – railroad and shipbuilding magnate; created the privately endowed Huntington Free Library and Reading Room near his summer home in the Throggs Neck neighborhood of the Bronx
- Elaine Kaufman (1929–2010) – businessperson; proprietor of Elaine's, a restaurant in the Manhattan borough of New York City that was a haunt of writers, actors, politicians
- Calvin Klein (born 1942) – clothing designer
- Ralph Lauren (born 1939) – clothing designer
- George Lois (1931–2022) – advertising
- William E. Macaulay (1945–2019) – billionaire businessman; CEO and chairman of First Reserve Corporation; co-founder of William E. Macaulay Honors College of City University of New York
- Reuben and Rose Mattus (1912–1994; 1916–2006) – founders of Häagen-Dazs ice cream
- Walton McCarthy (born 1951) – businessman and principal mechanical engineer with NORAD Shelter Systems
- George Meany (1894–1980) – labor union leader: first president of the AFL–CIO
- Jordan L. Mott (1799–1866) – inventor of coal kitchen stove, founder of J.L. Mott Ironworks in Mott Haven, and developer of the South Bronx neighborhood now named after him
- Mark Penn (born 1954) – chief executive officer of the public-relations firm Burson-Marsteller; president of the polling firm Penn, Schoen and Berland Associates
- Sol Price (1916–2009) – founder of the Price Club and FedMart retail stores
- Fred Trump (1905–1999) – real estate developer; father of Donald Trump
- Steve Witkoff (born 1957) – special envoy to the Middle East for U.S. President Donald Trump; real estate investor and developer, founder of the Witkoff Group, attorney

== Attorneys ==
- William Barr (born 1950) – U.S. attorney general under Donald Trump
- Pat Cipollone (born 1966) – Trump lawyer in impeachment case and elsewhere
- Bernard G. Ehrlich (1924–2014) – law partner of Mario Biaggi, National Guard major general, convicted in the Wedtech scandal
- Larry Fleisher (1930–1989) – sports agent, helped found the National Basketball Association Players Association
- Hal Kant (1931–2008) – specializing in representing musical groups, spent 35 years as principal lawyer and general counsel for the Grateful Dead
- Irving Picard (born 1941) – known for his recovery of funds from the Madoff investment scandal
- Gerald Shur (1933–2020) – founder of the United States Federal Witness Protection Program
- Melvyn Weiss (1935–2018) – co-founded plaintiff class action law firm Milberg Weiss

== Infamous ==
- David Berkowitz (born 1953) – "Son of Sam" serial killer
- Evgeny Buryakov (born 1975) – Russian spy
- Richard Cottingham (born 1946) – serial killer
- Larry Davis (1966–2008) – drug dealer; shot multiple police officers
- Harvey Glatman (1927–1959) serial killer known as the “Glamour Girl Slayer”
- John Gotti (1940–2002) – crime boss
- Sidney Gottlieb (1918–1999) – chemist who led the Central Intelligence Agency's 1950s–1960s assassination attempts and mind control program, known as Project MKUltra
- Moshe Lax (born 1974) – partner in Ivanka Trump Fine Jewelry; subject of multiple lawsuits
- Twymon Myers (1950–1973) – federal fugitive
- Jeffry Picower (1942–2009) – investor and philanthropist involved in the Madoff investment scandal
- Morton Sobell (1917–2018) – convicted along with Julius Rosenberg and Ethel Rosenberg in 1951 of being a spy for the Soviet Union
- Howard Spira (born 1959) – instrumental in George Steinbrenner's ban from baseball

== See also ==
- List of people from New York City
  - List of people from Brooklyn
  - List of people from Queens
  - List of people from Staten Island
