= William Cauldwell =

American politician

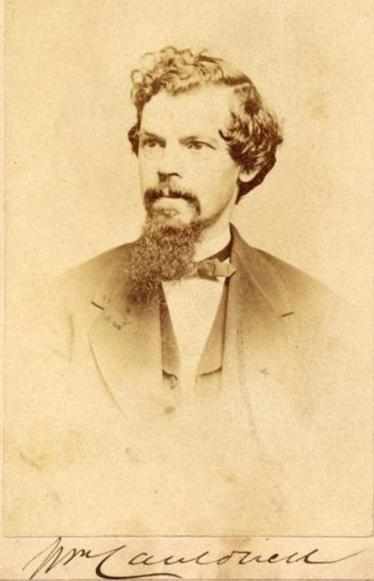
- William Cauldwell, editor and publisher of the New York Sunday Mercury
- Born: October 12, 1824
- Died: December 2, 1907 (aged 83)
- Occupation: Newspaper editor

William Cauldwell (October 12, 1824 – December 2, 1907) was a 19th-century newspaper publisher of the New York Sunday Mercury. He has been called the "Father of Sunday Journalism", and also served in the New York State Senate.

== Biography ==
Cauldwell was born in New York City on October 12, 1824, to Andrew and Margaret Ann Cauldwell. At age 11, he left home to live with an uncle in St. Martinville, Louisiana, and attended Jefferson College for three years. He then returned to New York, and after working for two years in a dry-goods store, got a job in the printing business under Samuel Adams.

=== Newspaper career ===
After Adams was murdered by John C. Colt, Cauldwell went to work at the New York Atlas (a Sunday only newspaper founded in 1838) around 1841, doing typesetting. He became acquainted with Walt Whitman during that time, and stayed at the Atlas until 1850.

In 1850, Cauldwell bought out Elbridge G. Paige's one-third ownership stake in the Sunday Mercury for $1,200. Cauldwell expanded the paper and increased its coverage of literature, city news, and sports. Sylvester Southworth and Horace P. Whitney (1834- August 24, 1884) soon joined Cauldwell, and the paper prospered.

Cauldwell and the Mercury are credited as being the first newspaper to regularly cover the sport of baseball as news, starting in 1853 with a report on a game between the Knickerbockers and the Gothams. The paper was the first to use the phrase "national pastime", in December 1856. In 1858, Cauldwell hired rising star Henrick Chadwick, later dubbed the "father of baseball", to cover the sport for the paper. Chadwick is more famous today, but Cauldwell was arguably the first major booster of baseball.

By 1876, Cauldwell had full ownership of the Mercury. In the early 1890s, however, the paper embarked an ill-fated plan to start up a daily edition. Losing money rapidly, Cauldwell apparently began to borrow funds from the estate of millionaire Jason Rogers, of which he was a co-trustee with his son-in-law Thomas Rogers, to try to keep the paper afloat. Some sources reported that it was Jason Rogers' and Cauldwell's mutual grandson (also named Jason Rogers) who convinced Cauldwell to expand the paper in the first place. In August 1894, Cauldwell gave up editorial control of the paper, with Jason Rogers stepping in as publisher and James F. Graham taking on the editorial duties. The paper continued to lose money (reportedly about $2000 a week), and in March 1895 Cauldwell sold the paper to William Noble in a somewhat unusual exchange, where he received a hotel called the Hotel Empire in exchange for the paper.

In 1901, Cauldwell returned to journalism as the editor of The Successful American.

=== Political career ===
Cauldwell was a member of the New York State Senate (9th D.) from 1868 to 1871, sitting in the 91st, 92nd, 93rd and 94th New York State Legislatures. He was a member of the New York State Assembly (Westchester Co., 1st D.) in 1874. He was Supervisor of The Bronx before it was annexed by New York City, and also served on the local board of education.

=== Death ===
Caudwell died on December 2, 1907, at his home on Madison Avenue. The New York Tribune called him "the father of Sunday journalism." He was buried at Woodlawn Cemetery.

== Personal ==
Cauldwell married Elizabeth Dyer on October 7, 1845, and had six children. His son Leslie Giffin Cauldwell became a well-known artist and decorator. His grandson Jason Rogers (son of his daughter Emily) started his publishing career at the Mercury under Cauldwell and had a successful career in the newspaper industry including with The New York Globe.

== Legacy ==
Cauldwell Avenue (named in 1916) and Cauldwell Playground (opened 1936, renamed the "Hilton White Playground" in 2009) in the Bronx were named in honor of Cauldwell. Cauldwell built a summer house on Long Island, New York in 1892, known as the William Cauldwell House, that was placed on the National Register of Historic Places in 2009.

New York State Senate
| Preceded by Henry R. Low | New York State Senate; 9th District; 1868–1871 | Succeeded by William H. Robertson |
New York State Assembly
| Preceded by William Herring | New York State Assembly; Westchester County, 1st District; 1874 | Succeeded by Dennis R. Shiel |
