= Sunday Mercury (New York) =

Weekly newspaper in New York City

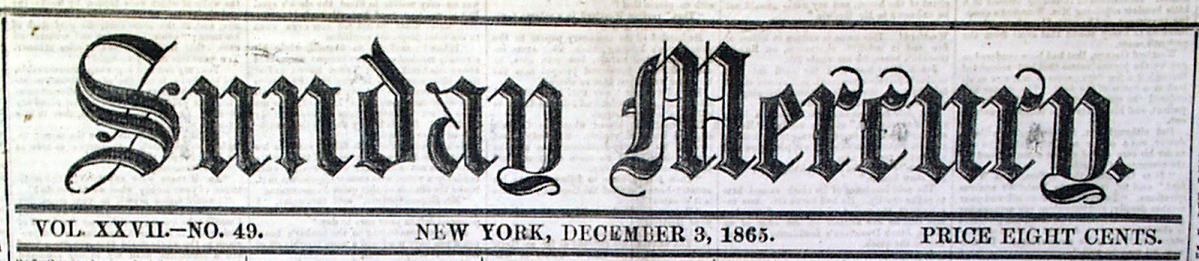
- Type: Weekly newspaper (1839–1893); Daily (1893–1896)
- Format: broadsheet
- Founded: 1839
- Ceased publication: 1896
- Headquarters: Manhattan
- Circulation: 145,000 (1861)
- OCLC number: 9588307

The Sunday Mercury (1839–1896) (sometimes referred to as the New York Sunday Mercury) was a weekly Sunday newspaper published in New York City that grew to become the highest-circulation weekly newspaper (at least by its own claims) in the United States at its peak. It was known for publishing and popularizing the work of many notable 19th-century writers, including Charles Farrar Browne and Robert Henry Newell, and was the first Eastern paper to publish Mark Twain. It was also the first newspaper to provide regular coverage of baseball, and was popular for the extensive war correspondence from soldiers it published during the Civil War.

== History ==
=== Early years ===
Before 1825 no American newspapers published editions on Sunday, out of respect to the Sabbath, religious day of rest. Over time, however, this created a niche for new weekly newspapers published on Sunday to flourish.

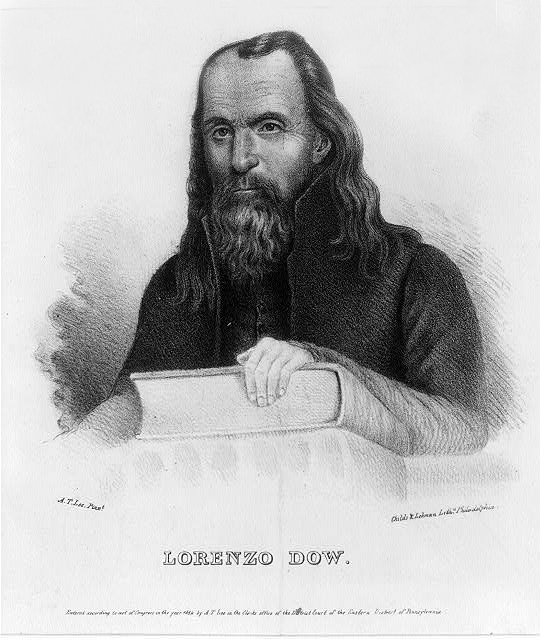
Lorenzo Dow (1777–1834), the inspiration for the comic "Short Patent Sermons" written by Elbridge G. Paige under the name "Dow Jr." in the Mercury

The Mercury originated as the Sunday Morning Visiter, and was first published on May 12, 1839. By 1840, it changed its name to the Sunday Mercury. It initially gained some notice for its theatrical coverage and so-called "machine poetry" (a 19th century euphemism for slavishly following the "rules" of poetry without any inspiration). By the fall of 1842 the paper had a circulation of 3,000, ranking it third among New York's growing Sunday papers, trailing the New York Herald's Sunday edition and The Atlas. By the summer of 1844, the Herald took note of the growth of the Sunday papers, calling them "partly literary, partly gossiping, partly silly, partly smart, partly stupid, partly namby-pamby."

Elbridge Gerry Paige (1813–1859) and Samuel Nichols (1809?–1854) were the two key editors of the Mercury in its early years, and Augustus Krauth joined them as a one-third owner in 1842.

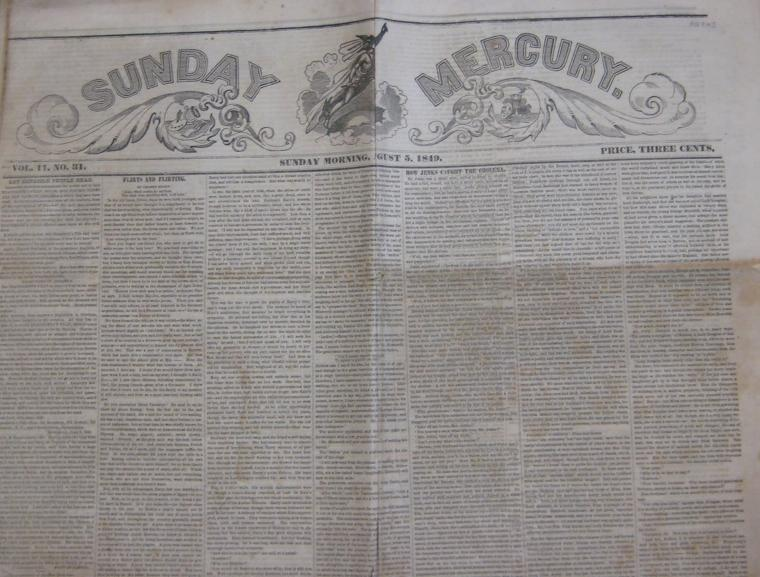
Top half of front page of August 5, 1849 Sunday Mercury

Paige had success with his Short Patent Sermons published in the paper (from its outset) under the pseudonym "Dow Junior" (a reference to famous eccentric preacher Lorenzo Dow who died in 1834), which literary magazines such as The Knickerbocker lauded for their odd and original wit. Paige left the paper in 1849 and went to California, where he continued to publish Dow Jr. sermons in The Golden Era, but ultimately was unsuccessful there and is said to have died in extreme poverty in 1859.

Nichols was born in Hampstead, England around 1809 and after coming to New York City was eventually installed as the editor of the New Times, an organ of the "Conservatives" political party. After that venture failed, he joined the Sunday Mercury and grew it with Paige. His work focused on the theater. Nichols stayed with the paper until his death in September 1854, when he was run over after unsuccessfully trying to board a Third Avenue Railway car.

Krauth, the other one-third owner of the paper, died in November 1857.

=== Growth, baseball, and war ===
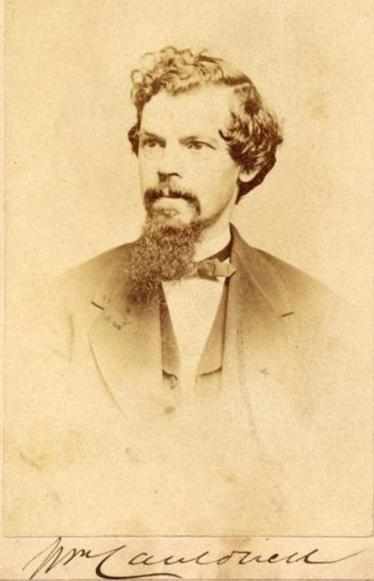
William Cauldwell, the "father of Sunday journalism"

In 1850, William Cauldwell (1824–1907) purchased Paige's one-third ownership stake in the paper for $1,200. Cauldwell had gotten into the newspaper field by doing typesetting work, and worked at the New York Sunday Atlas from 1841 to 1849. Cauldwell expanded the paper and increased its coverage of literature, city news, and sports. Sylvester Southworth and Horace P. Whitney (1834 – August 24, 1884) soon joined as additional editors, and the paper began to prosper.

Cauldwell and the Mercury are credited as being the first newspaper to regularly cover the sport of baseball as news, starting in 1853 with a report on a game between the Knickerbockers and the Gothams. (For some time, this 1853 report was thought to be first game ever reported on by the press, but later 20th century scholarship has located an 1845 report in the Herald.) The paper was the first to use the phrase "national pastime" to describe the new sport in America in December 1856. In 1858, Cauldwell hired rising star Henrick Chadwick, later dubbed the "father of baseball", to cover the sport for the paper.

By early 1861, the Mercury's circulation was 145,000, but the advent of the American Civil War cut off about 90,000 of them located in the seceded southern and more isolated western United States. Cauldwell hit upon an idea for expanding their war coverage with little expense. In April 1861, the paper made an announcement inviting soldiers to send in their reports about the war, and over 3,000 were published during the course of the war as a weekly feature. The soldiers would receive a free copy of the paper for their contributions. In 2000, Civil War historian William B. Styple compiled 500 of the soldiers' letters in a book, Writing and Fighting the Civil War: Soldier Correspondence to the New York Sunday Mercury.

In 1873, Rowell's American Newspaper Directory stated that with a circulation of 45,000, "the circulation of the Sunday Mercury exceeds that of any other Sunday or daily newspaper in America without exception, and more than triples the combined issues of all the other Sunday journals published in New York."

Southworth retired from the paper before the end of the war, and Whitney departed around 1876 due to poor health, leaving Cauldwell solely in charge. In addition to running the paper Cauldwell also held political office, serving in the New York State Senate from 1868 to 1879, and also serving as The Bronx county supervisor.

=== Ill-fated expansion and collapse ===
By the early 1890s, competition with the New York daily papers had increased. The paper responded by introducing a one cent daily newspaper dubbed the Daily Mercury, billed as a Democratic paper, in January 1893. The new venture was quickly losing money, however. Cauldwell apparently began to borrow funds from the estate of millionaire Jason Rogers, of which he was a co-trustee with his son-in-law Thomas Rogers, to try to keep the paper afloat. Some sources reported that it was Jason Rogers' and Cauldwell's mutual grandson (also named Jason Rogers) who convinced Cauldwell to expand the paper in the first place. The younger Rogers, for his part, later blamed the failure of the paper on a decision by the "boss" to launch the daily edition as a morning paper, upsetting carefully laid plans and a large number of advance subscriptions for a paper based on afternoon publication. (Rogers later went on to transform the Commercial Advertiser into The New York Globe, and helped found the Audit Bureau of Circulations in North America.)

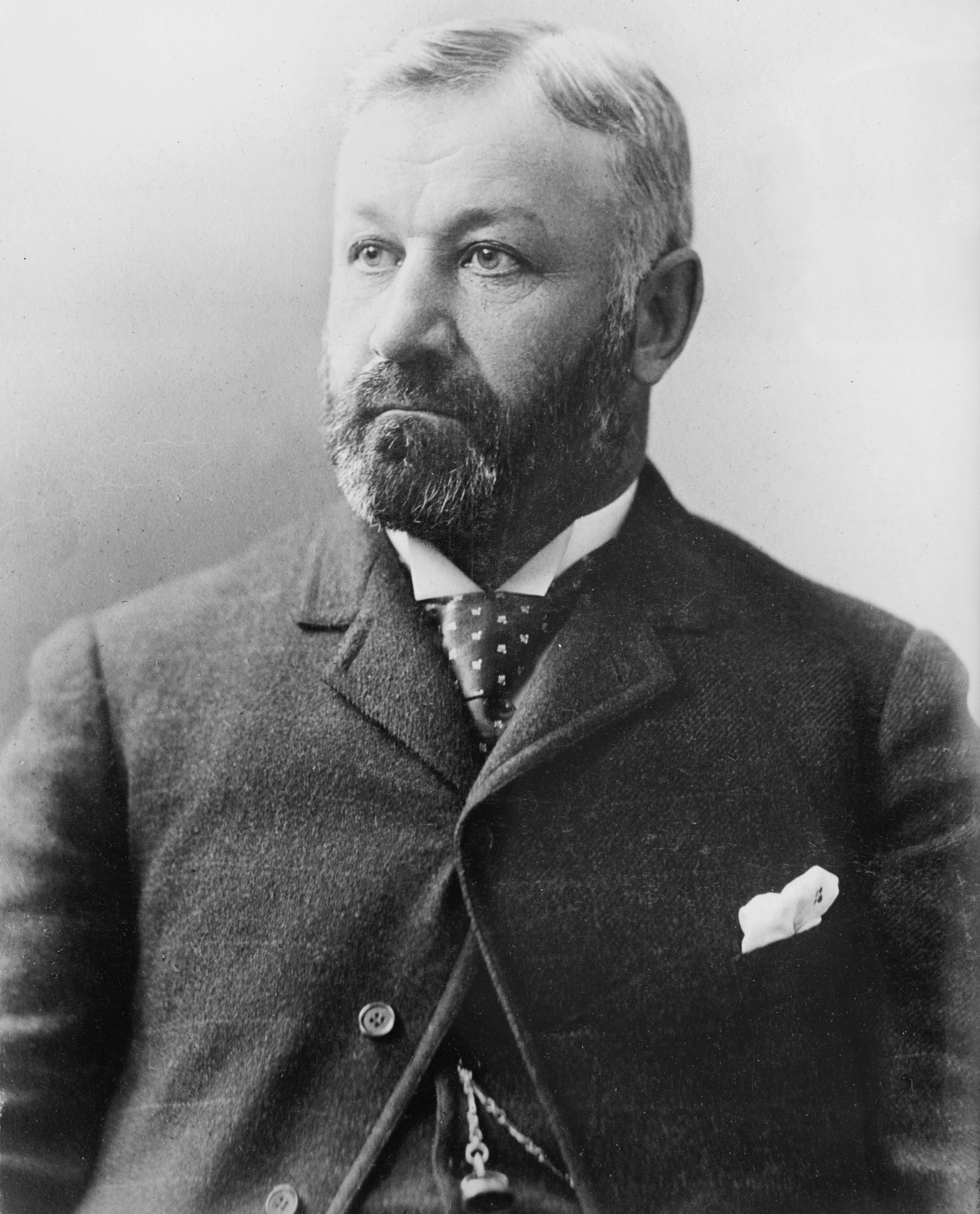
Richard Croker, who influenced the Mercury after consolidation with his Daily America in 1894

In May 1893, Richard Croker, a leader of New York City's Tammany Hall political machine, jumped into the newspaper field and created The Daily America devoted to politics to trumpet Tammany's views (though it also covered sports; Croker was a big horse racing enthusiast). The other Democratic papers in the city balked at the new competition, however, and Croker turned over the paper to the Mercury by the end of the year. In January 1894, The New York Times reported that the two papers had "consolidated" (and that some of "the gentlemen" involved in the America would retain an interest) and would henceforth be published as The Daily America on weekdays with the Sunday Mercury below in small type, and reversed on Sundays.

In August 1894, Cauldwell, now almost 70, gave up editorial control with his grandson Jason Rogers stepping in as publisher, and James F. Graham taking on the editorial duties. The paper also dropped the Daily America title, although it remained a Democratic paper.

The paper continued to lose money (reportedly about $2000 a week), and in March 1895 Cauldwell sold out to William Noble in a somewhat unusual exchange, where he received a hotel called the Hotel Empire (a project which Noble had bought out of foreclosure in 1893 and completed) in exchange for the paper.

News reports from mid-1895 reported that "silver men", whose support in the East had been limited, had now purchased the paper to be their house organ. Although the paper did advocate in support of free silver in 1895, it appears the anticipated sale to "silver men" fell apart, as Noble had to file for bankruptcy in 1899 due to his Mercury debts.

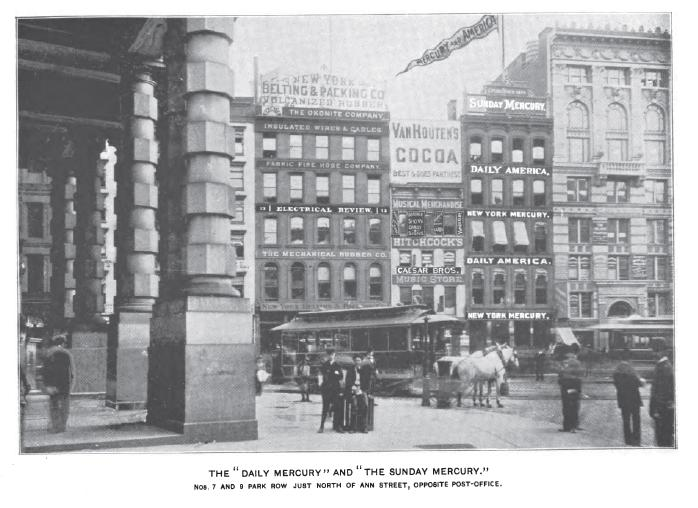
The Mercury offices on Park Row, circa 1894

During this same period (early–mid-1895), Adolph Ochs, then-editor of the Chattanooga Times (and future longtime owner / publisher of The New York Times) was invited to become editor and half-owner of the Mercury in its "free silver" campaign. Ochs turned the offer down, in part because of his own support for the gold standard. The paper was then offered to Ochs for outright sale, but that also did not come to fruition when it turned out that the Mercury could not assure that its rights to press association copy would transfer to a new owner. Ochs remained on the lookout for a New York paper, however, and by August 1896, he purchased the then also-struggling New York Times, founded in 1851 by Henry Raymond and several others.

The Mercury ceased publishing altogether under that name around late 1896. Some older sources state the paper failed in 1895, but it was still being published well into 1896, though it was certainly on its last legs. On September 20, 1896, the New York Times reported that the office of the Mercury "was still closed last night" and the Chicago Tribune printed on September 28 that the "free silver sentiment in New York was not even warm enough to prevent the fail of the New York Mercury."

When Cauldwell died in 1907, the New York Tribune called him "the father of Sunday journalism."

== Rebirth as the Morning Telegraph ==
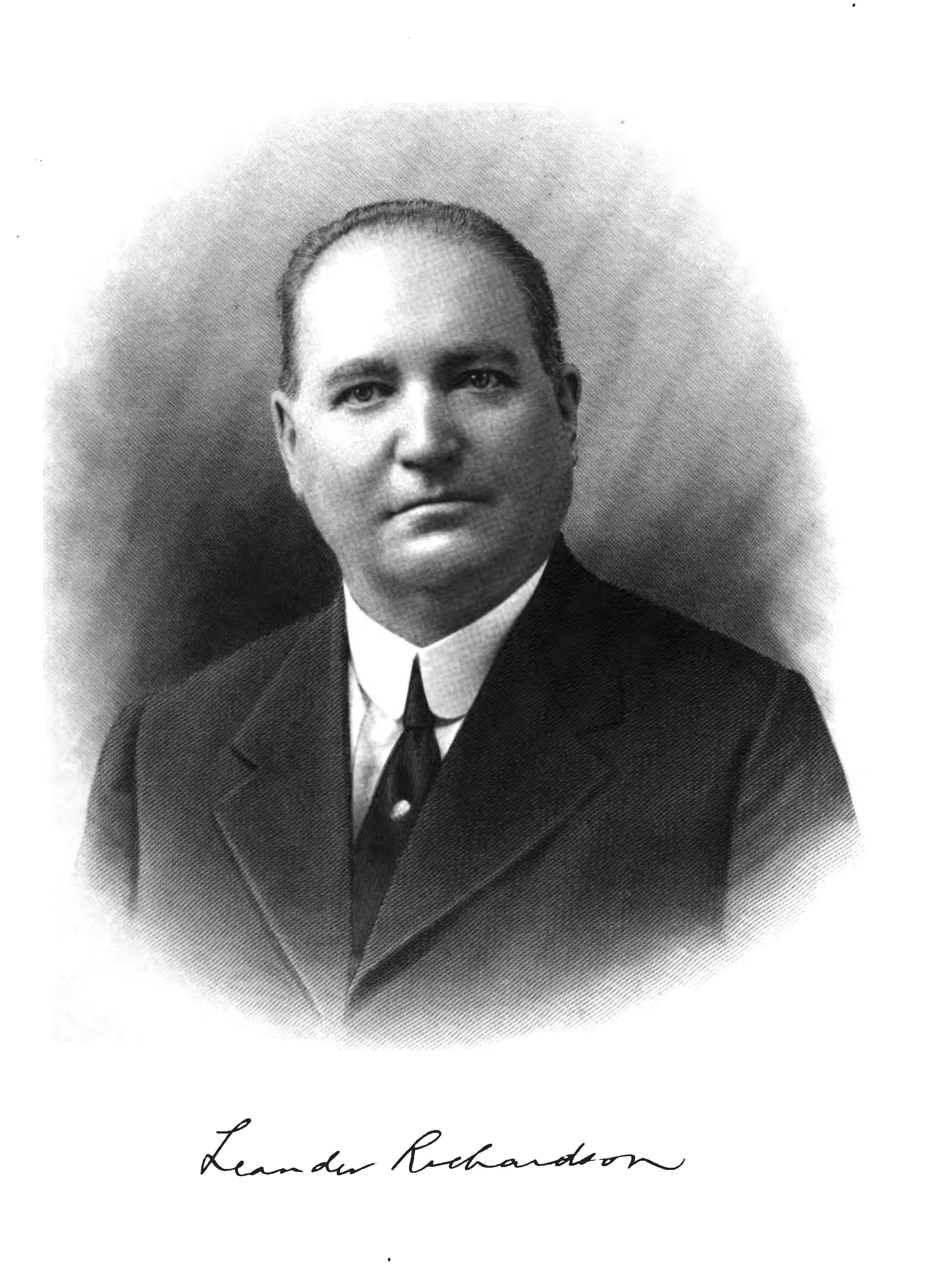
Leander Richardson

By end of 1896, the operations of the Mercury were taken over and redubbed the New York Morning Telegraph, focusing on sporting (especially horse racing) and theatrical news much as the Mercury had been doing at that point. According to one account published in 1940, the name change came about when Tammany Hall gave $10,000 to writer Blakely Hall, "to run it with the understanding that he was not to get a nickel more. Hall threw out the Mercury title, called the 'new' sheet the Morning Telegraph, hired Leander Richardson (1856–1918) as managing editor, and put it out as a daily sporting and theatrical newspaper."

The Telegraph went on to become a successful paper and was published until shut down during a strike in 1972. The Telegraph considered itself a continuation of the Mercury, though along the way it somehow backdated its claimed date of founding from 1839 to 1833.

== Noted contributors and legacy ==
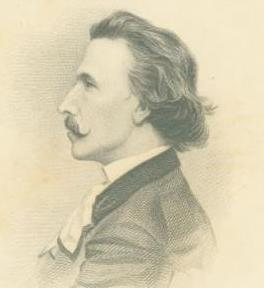
Robert Henry Newell, aka Orpheus C. Kerr, circa 1864, whose humorous writings first drew national attention in the Sunday Mercury

Aside from the Short Patent Sermons which brought acclaim to Paige's "Dow Jr." pseudonym in the 1840s, the Mercury went on to publish the work of many leading 19th-century writers, and was at times the first to introduce them to New York and national audiences, including Mark Twain, Josh Billings, Charles Farrar Browne (Artemus Ward), Robert Henry Newell (Orpheus C. Kerr), Ella Wheeler Wilcox, Charles Godfrey Leland, David Ross Locke (Petroleum V. Nasby), Ned Buntline, and Mortimer Thomson (Doesticks). Though most of those names are not familiar today, all became well-known popular writers of the time.

Mark Twain's first writing published in the East appeared in the Mercury in 1864 (prior to his success in 1865 with The Celebrated Jumping Frog of Calaveras County), and a number of additional pieces were published in 1867.

Newell, who wrote under the name "Orpheus C. Kerr" (a play on "office seeker"), served for a time as the literary editor of the Mercury, until around 1862. His satirical weekly columns started in Mercury and gained national fame, so much so that President Abraham Lincoln once remarked of Kerr's writings that "anyone who has not read them is a heathen."

Celebrated actress Adah Isaacs Menken contributed a series of poems to the Mercury in 1860–61, as well as a piece praising Walt Whitman and Leaves of Grass in 1860 as "centuries ahead of his contemporaries".

Starting in the mid-1870s, John W. Overall (1822–1899) served as literary editor of the paper (until at least 1890). A Southerner, Overall is best known for his pre-Civil War writing supporting the South.

Historian James W. Cook, in a 2005 compilation of writings by P. T. Barnum (of circus fame, who also appeared in the Mercury), notes that in the mid-1860s, the Mercury was "ubiquitous, with a masthead claim of the largest weekly circulation in America", yet today publications such as the Mercury, which contained few illustrations, are difficult to locate in library collections.

== Chronology of editors and publishers ==
- Editors:
  - 1855: Krauth, Cauldwell & Southworth
  - 1858–61: Cauldwell, Southworth & Whitney
  - 1867: Cauldwell & Whitney
  - 1876: William Cauldwell
  - 1894: James F. Graham
- Publishers:
  - 1839: E.G. Paige & J.H. Wilson
  - 1839–40: Paige, Wilson & Nichols
  - 1840–41: Paige & Nichols
  - 1842–48: Paige, Nichols & Krauth
  - 1854–55: Krauth & Cauldwell
  - 1855: Krauth, Cauldwell & Southworth
  - 1858–61: Cauldwell, Southworth & Whitney
  - 1862–70: Cauldwell & Whitney
  - 1876: William Cauldwell
  - 1894: Jason Rogers, grandson of Cauldwell
