= Robert Henry Newell =

American humorist (1836–1901)

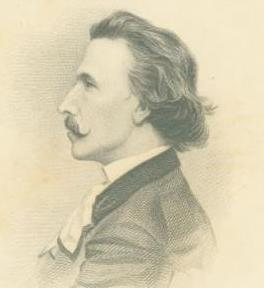
- Robert Henry Newell, circa 1864
- Born: December 13, 1836; New York City
- Died: July 1901 (aged 64); Brooklyn, New York
- Occupation: Writer
- Spouse: Adah Isaacs Menken (1862–65)
- Parent(s): Robert Newell (1803–54) and Anne (Lawrence) Newell

Robert Henry Newell (December 13, 1836 – July 1901) was a 19th-century American humorist.

During the U.S. Civil War, Newell wrote a series of satirical articles using the pseudonym Orpheus C. Kerr, commenting on the war and contemporary society. His articles appeared weekly in the New York Sunday Mercury, where he was the literary editor until 1862, and were published in a series of books. Among other newspapers he worked at, from 1869 to 1874 he wrote for the New York World. From approximately 1862 to 1865, he was married to famous actress Adah Isaacs Menken.

The name "Orpheus C. Kerr" was a play on the term "office seeker". At the time, political offices were seen as plums, involving relatively little work and regular pay, and were used by political parties as rewards for faithful party workers.

During the war, The Orpheus C. Kerr Papers was widely read and Newell enjoyed great popularity. He was one of the favorite humorists of Abraham Lincoln. When General Montgomery C. Meigs admitted that he had never heard of Orpheus C. Kerr or his Papers, Lincoln responded, "anyone who has not read them is a heathen."

== Selected bibliography ==
- The Orpheus C. Kerr Papers (1862; Letters 1–52)
- The Orpheus C. Kerr Papers (Volume II; 1863; Letters 53–79)
- The Palace Beautiful and Other Poems (1864)
- The Orpheus C. Kerr Papers (Volume III; 1865; Letters 80–108)
- Avery Glibun, or Between Two Fires (1867)
- Smoked Glass (1868)
- The Cloven Foot (1870; a parody of The Mystery of Edwin Drood by Charles Dickens)
- Versatilities (poems; 1871)
- The Walking Doll; or the Asters and Disasters of Society (1872)
- Studies in Stanzas (1882)
- There was once a Man (1884)
