= Noyack, New York =

Noyac, New York
- Census-designated place
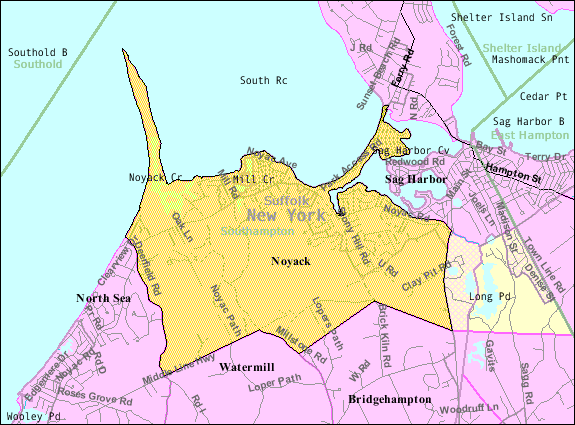

- Location within New York
- Coordinates: 40°59′28″N 72°20′4″W
- Country: United States
- State: New York
- County: Suffolk

Area
  - Total: 8.72 sq mi (22.58 km^{2})
  - Land: 8.40 sq mi (21.75 km^{2})
  - Water: 0.32 sq mi (0.84 km^{2})
- Elevation: 26 ft (8 m)

Population (2020)
  - Total: 4,325
  - Density: 515.1/sq mi (198.88/km^{2})
- Time zone: UTC-5 (Eastern (EST))
  - Summer (DST): UTC-4 (EDT)
- FIPS code: 36-54056
- GNIS feature ID: 0959050

Noyack (also Noyac) is a hamlet and census-designated place (CDP) in Suffolk County, New York, United States. The CDP population was 4,325 at the 2020 census.

Noyac is an Algonquin word meaning "a corner or point of land". It is believed that it refers to Jessup Neck, granted to John Jessup in 1679.

Noyac is located on the South Fork of Long Island in the Town of Southampton. The community is at the edge of Noyac Bay.

The William Cauldwell House was added to the National Register of Historic Places in 2009.

== Geography ==
Noyac is located at 40°59′28″N 72°20′4″W (40.991160, -72.334417).

According to the United States Census Bureau, the Noyac CDP has a total area of 8.7 square miles (22.6 km^{2}), of which 8.4 square miles (21.8 km^{2}) is land and 0.31 square miles (0.8 km^{2}), or 3.70%, is water.

== Demographics ==
Historical population
Census	Pop.	Note	%±
2020	4,325		—
U.S. Decennial Census

=== 2020 census ===
As of the 2020 census, Noyack had a population of 4,325. The median age was 50.0 years. 17.4% of residents were under the age of 18 and 24.4% of residents were 65 years of age or older. For every 100 females there were 90.7 males, and for every 100 females age 18 and over there were 88.6 males age 18 and over.

90.8% of residents lived in urban areas, while 9.2% lived in rural areas.

There were 1,797 households in Noyack, of which 27.7% had children under the age of 18 living in them. Of all households, 51.3% were married-couple households, 16.7% were households with a male householder and no spouse or partner present, and 26.3% were households with a female householder and no spouse or partner present. About 26.9% of all households were made up of individuals and 14.7% had someone living alone who was 65 years of age or older.

There were 2,832 housing units, of which 36.5% were vacant. The homeowner vacancy rate was 2.4% and the rental vacancy rate was 14.6%.

Racial composition as of the 2020 census
Race	Number	Percent
White	3,543	81.9%
Black or African American	60	1.4%
American Indian and Alaska Native	30	0.7%
Asian	76	1.8%
Native Hawaiian and Other Pacific Islander	0	0.0%
Some other race	288	6.7%
Two or more races	328	7.6%
Hispanic or Latino (of any race)	578	13.4%

=== 2000 census ===
As of the census of 2000, there were 2,696 people, 1,158 households, and 716 families residing in the CDP. The population density was 383.2 inhabitants per square mile (148.0/km^{2}). There were 1,993 housing units at an average density of 283.3 per square mile (109.4/km^{2}). The racial makeup of the CDP was 95.81% White, 0.96% African American, 0.11% Native American, 0.85% Asian, 0.04% Pacific Islander, 1.45% from other races, and 0.78% from two or more races. Hispanic or Latino of any race were 4.60% of the population.

There were 1,158 households, out of which 25.1% had children under the age of 18 living with them, 51.3% were married couples living together, 6.9% had a female householder with no husband present, and 38.1% were non-families. 30.1% of all households were made up of individuals, and 13.0% had someone living alone who was 65 years of age or older. The average household size was 2.33 and the average family size was 2.92.

In the CDP, the population was spread out, with 21.3% under the age of 18, 4.4% from 18 to 24, 27.3% from 25 to 44, 27.2% from 45 to 64, and 19.8% who were 65 years of age or older. The median age was 44 years. For every 100 females, there were 96.8 males. For every 100 females age 18 and over, there were 93.5 males.

The median income for a household in the CDP was $54,176, and the median income for a family was $66,667. Males had a median income of $53,788 versus $34,167 for females. The per capita income for the CDP was $31,956. About 2.8% of families and 3.9% of the population were below the poverty line, including 5.2% of those under age 18 and 1.9% of those age 65 or over.
