= William Cauldwell House =

Historic house in New York, United States

- U.S. National Register of Historic Places
- Location within New York Location within the United States
- Location: 51 Peconic Ave., Noyack, New York
- Coordinates: 40°59′23.59″N 72°22′21.33″W
- Area: 0.9 acres (0.36 ha)
- Built: 1892
- Architectural style: Queen Anne
- NRHP reference No.: 09000305
- Added to NRHP: May 4, 2009

William Cauldwell House is a historic home located at Noyack in Suffolk County, New York. It was built in 1892 for newspaper publisher William Cauldwell, and is a three-story, three bay wide building with a steeply pitched, side gabled roof, a two-story central dormer extending from the second through the third stories and a single story, wrap-around porch. It is in the Queen Anne style.

It was added to the National Register of Historic Places in 2009.
