= Adah Isaacs Menken =

American actress, dancer, painter, and poet (1835–1868)

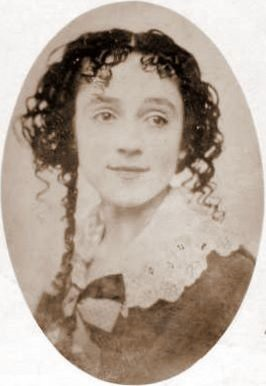
- Adah Isaacs Menken, age 19
- Born: June 15, 1835
- Died: August 10, 1868 (aged 33); Paris, France
- Occupations: Actress; painter; poet

Adah Isaacs Menken (June 15, 1835 – August 10, 1868) was an American actress, painter and poet, and was the highest earning actress of her time. She was best known for her performance in the hippodrama Mazeppa, with a climax that featured her apparently nude and riding a horse on stage. After great success for a few years with the play in New York and San Francisco, she appeared in a production in London and Paris, from 1864 to 1866. After a brief trip back to the United States, she returned to Europe. She became ill within two years and died in Paris at the age of 33.

Menken told many versions of her origins, including her name, place of birth, ancestry, and religion, and historians have differed in their accounts. Most have said she was born a Louisiana Creole Catholic, with European and African ancestry. A celebrity who created sensational performances in the United States and Europe, she married several times and was also known for her affairs. She had two sons, both of whom died in infancy.

Though she was better known as an actress, Menken sought to be known as a writer. She published about 20 essays, 100 poems, and a book of her collected poems, from 1855 to 1868 (the book was published posthumously). Early work was devoted to family and after her marriage, her poetry and essays featured Jewish themes. Beginning with work published after moving to New York, with which she changed her style, Menken expressed a wide range of emotions and ideas about women's place in the world. Her collection Infelicia went through several editions and was in print until 1902.

== Early life and education ==
Accounts of Menken's early life and origins vary considerably. In her autobiographical "Some Notes of Her Life in Her Own Hand," published in The New York Times in 1868, Menken said she was born in Bordeaux, France, and lived in Cuba as a child before her family settled in New Orleans. There are many conflicting reports as to Menken's birth name, but she has been called Marie Rachel Adelaide de Vere Spenser and Adah Bertha Theodore, and Ed James, a journalist friend, wrote after her death: "Her real name was Adelaide McCord, and she was born at Milneburg, near New Orleans, on June 15, 1835." Menken's birth year also varies, with some records stating 1835 and some stating 1832. Elsewhere, in 1865, she wrote that her birth name was Dolores Adios Los Fiertes, and that she was the daughter of a French woman from New Orleans and a Spanish-Jewish man. About 1940, the consensus of scholars was that her parents were Auguste Théodore, a free Black man, and Marie, a mixed-race Creole, and Adah was raised as a Catholic. She had a sister and a brother.

Based on Menken's assertions of being a native of New Orleans, Wolf Mankowitz and others have studied Board of Health records for the city. They have concluded that Ada was born in the city as the legitimate daughter of Auguste Théodore, a free man of color (mixed race) and his wife Magdaleine Jean Louis Janneaux, likely also a Louisiana Creole. Ada would have been raised as Catholic. However, in 1990, John Cofran, using census records, said that she was born as Ada C. McCord, in Memphis, Tennessee, in late 1830. He said she was the daughter of an Irish merchant, Richard McCord, and his wife Catherine. According to Cofran, her father died when she was young and her mother remarried. The family then moved from Memphis to New Orleans.

Menken was said to have been a bright student; she became fluent in French and Spanish, and was described as having a gift for languages. As a child, Menken performed as a dancer in the ballet of the French Opera House in New Orleans. In her later childhood, she performed as a dancer in Havana, Cuba, where she was crowned "Queen of the Plaza."

== American career ==
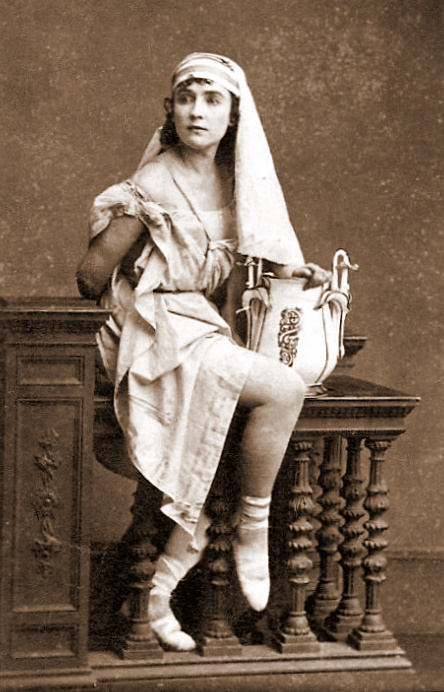
Menken as The French Spy, 1863

After Cuba, Menken left dance for acting, and began working as an actress in Texas first. According to Gregory Eiselein, she gave Shakespeare readings, and wrote poems and sketches for The Liberty Gazette. She was married for the first time in Galveston County, in February 1855, to G. W. Kneass, a musician. The marriage had ended by sometime in 1856, when she met and in 1856 married the man more generally considered her first husband, Alexander Isaac Menken, a musician who was from a prominent Reform Jewish family in Cincinnati, Ohio.

He began to act as her manager, and Ada Menken performed as an actress in the Midwest and Upper South, also giving literary readings. She received decent reviews, which noted her "reckless energy," and performed with men who became notable actors: Edwin Booth in Louisville, Kentucky, and James E. Murdoch in Nashville, Tennessee.

In 1857, the couple moved to Cincinnati, where Menken created her Jewish roots, telling a reporter that she was born Jewish. She did study Judaism and stayed with the faith, although she never formally converted. In this period, she published poetry and articles on Judaism in The Israelite in Cincinnati. The newspaper was founded by Rabbi Isaac Mayer Wise, who was crucial to the Reform Judaism movement in the United States. She also began to be published in the Jewish Messenger of New York.

Ada added an "h" to her first name and an "s" to Isaac, and by 1858 she billed herself as Adah Isaacs Menken. She eventually worked as an actress in New York and San Francisco, as well as in touring productions across the country. She also became known for her poetry and painting. While none of her art was well received by major critics, she became a celebrity.

At this time, Menken wore her wavy hair short, a highly unusual style for women of the time. She cultivated a bohemian and at times androgynous appearance. She deliberately created her image at a time when the growth of popular media helped to publicize it.

In 1859, Menken appeared on Broadway in New York City in the play The French Spy. Her work was not highly regarded by critics. The New York Times described her as "the worst actress on Broadway." The Observer said, "she is delightfully unhampered by the shackles of talent." Menken continued to perform small parts in New York, as well as reading Shakespeare in performance, and giving lectures.

Her third husband was John C. Heenan, a popular Irish-American prizefighter whom she married in 1859. Some time after their marriage, the press discovered she did not yet have a legal divorce from Menken and accused her of bigamy. She had expected Menken to handle the divorce, which he eventually did.

As John Heenan was one of the most famous and popular figures in America, the press also accused Menken of marrying for his celebrity. She billed herself as Mrs. Heenan in Boston, Providence, Baltimore, and Philadelphia, using his name despite their divorce within a year of marriage. They had a son, who died soon after birth.

While in New York, Menken met the poet Walt Whitman and some others of his bohemian circle. She was influenced by his work and began to write in a more confessional style while adhering to common sentimental conventions of the time. In 1860–61, she published 25 poems in the Sunday Mercury, an entertainment newspaper in New York. These were later collected with six more in her only book, Infelicia, published a few months after her death. By publishing in a newspaper, she reached a larger audience than through women's magazines, including both men and women readers who might go to see her perform as an actress.

In 1860, Menken wrote a review titled "Swimming Against the Current," which praised Whitman's new edition of Leaves of Grass, saying he was "centuries ahead of his contemporaries." She identified with the controversial poet, and declared her bohemian identity through her support for him. That year, Menken also wrote an article on the 1860 election, an unusual topic for a woman, which further added to her image.

When Menken met Charles Blondin, notable for crossing Niagara Falls on a tightrope, the two were quickly attracted to each other. She suggested she would marry him if they could perform a couple's act above the falls. Blondin refused, saying that he would be "distracted by her beauty." The two had an affair, during which they conducted a vaudeville tour across the United States.

== Mazeppa ==
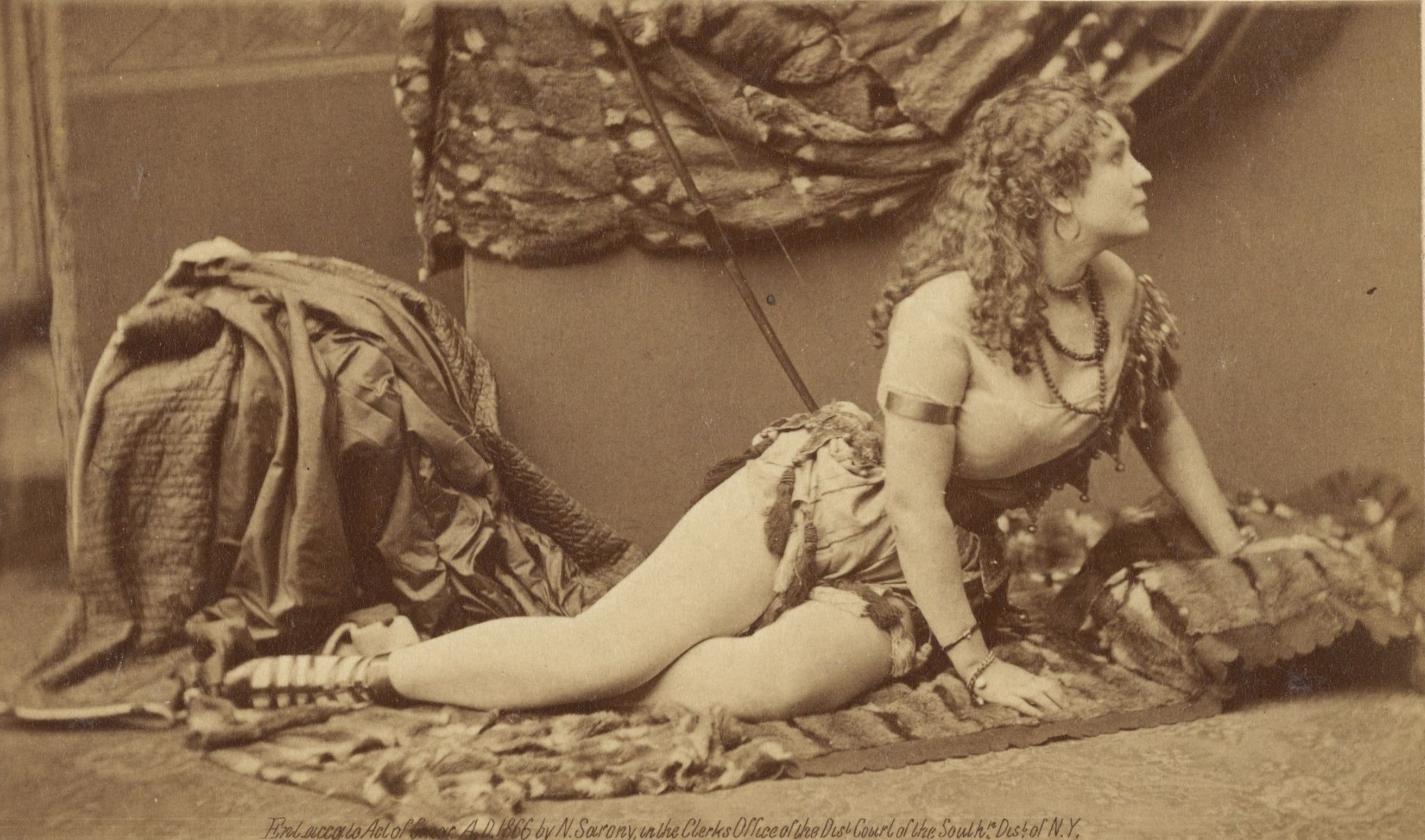
Menken in Mazeppa, 1866

After it ended, she appealed to her business manager Jimmie Murdock to help her become recognized as a great actress. Murdock dissuaded Menken from that goal, as he believed she had little acting talent. He offered her the "breeches role" (that of a man) of the noble Tartar in the hippodrama Mazeppa, based on the poem of that title by Lord Byron (and ultimately on the life of Ivan Mazepa). At the climax of this hit, the Tartar was stripped of his clothing, tied to his horse, and sent off to his death. The audiences were thrilled with the scene, although the production used a dummy strapped to a horse, which was led away by a handler giving sugar cubes. Menken wanted to perform the stunt herself. Dressed in nude tights and riding a horse on stage, she appeared to be naked and caused a sensation. New York audiences were shocked but still attended and made the play popular.

Menken took the production of Mazeppa to San Francisco, where it continued to be well-attended. She became known across the country for this role, and San Francisco adopted her as its performer.

In 1862, she married Robert Henry Newell, a humorist and editor of the Sunday Mercury in New York, who had recently published most of her poetry. They were together about three years. In 1866, she wed James Paul Barkley, a gambler, but soon returned without him to France, where she was performing. There she had their son, whom she named Louis Dudevant Victor Emanuel Barkley. The baby's godmother was the author George Sand (A. F. Lesser). Louis died in infancy.

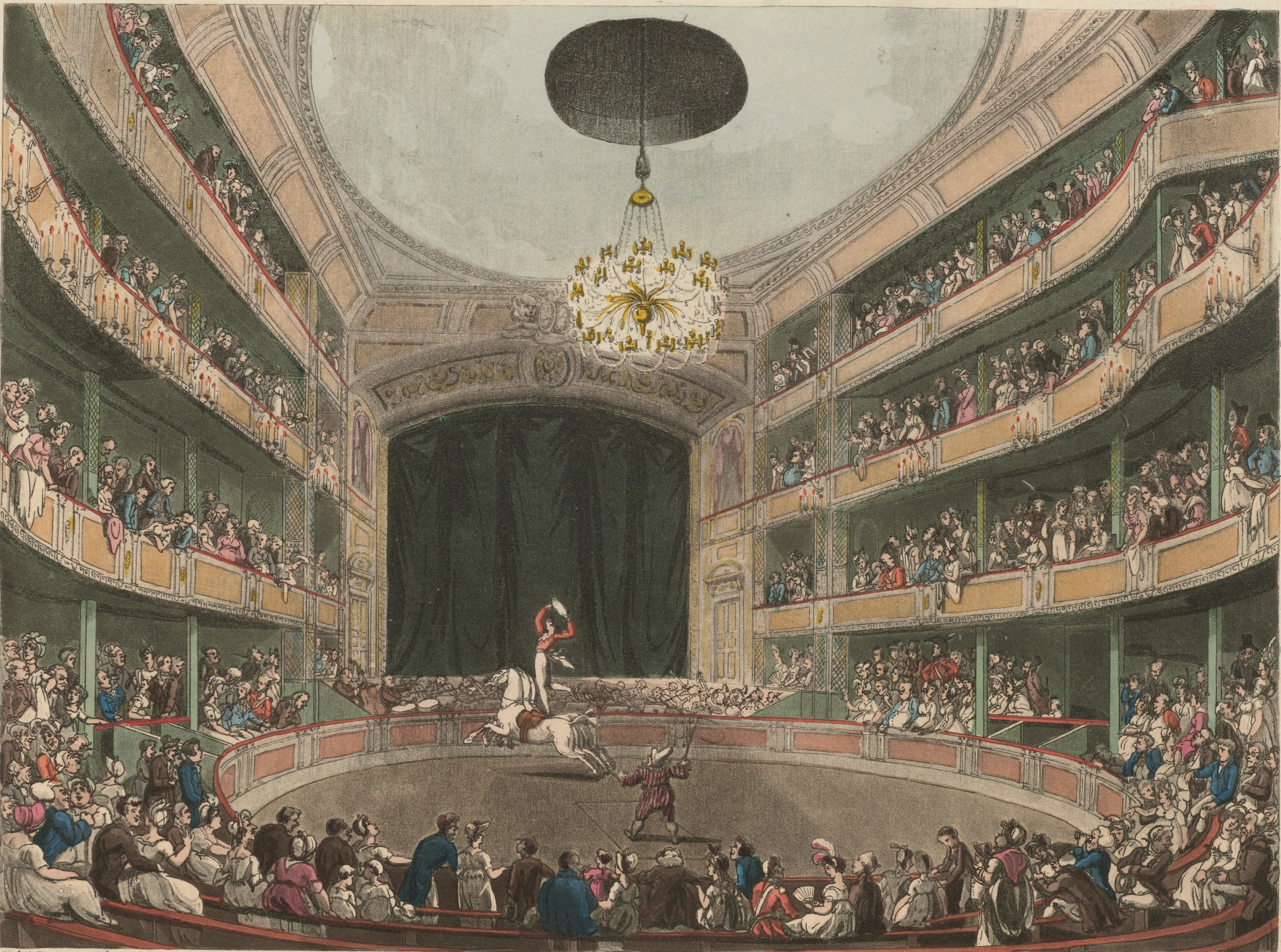
A previous version of Astley's Amphitheatre, showing the horse ring

Menken arranged to play in a production of Mazeppa in London and France for much of 1864 to 1866. Controversy arose over her costume, and she responded to critics in the newspapers of London by saying that she was influenced by classical sculpture, and that her costume was more modest than those of ballet or burlesque. The show opened on October 3, 1864, at the Astley Theatre to "overflowing houses." She was so well known that she was referred to as "the Menken," needing no other name.

Jokes and poems were printed about the controversy, and Punch wrote:

Here's half the town - if bills be true -
To Astley's nightly thronging,
To see the Menken throw aside
All to her sex belonging,
Stripping off woman's modesty,
With woman's outward trappings -
A barebacked jade on barebacked steed,
In Cartlich's old strappings!

(The last line refers to John Cartlich, equestrian performer)

At this lucrative height of her career, she was generous to friends, theatre workers in need, and charities. While in Europe, Menken's image continued to play to the American public as well. She attracted a crowd of male admirers, including writer Charles Dickens, humorist Tom Hood, and dramatist and novelist Charles Reade.

== Later life ==
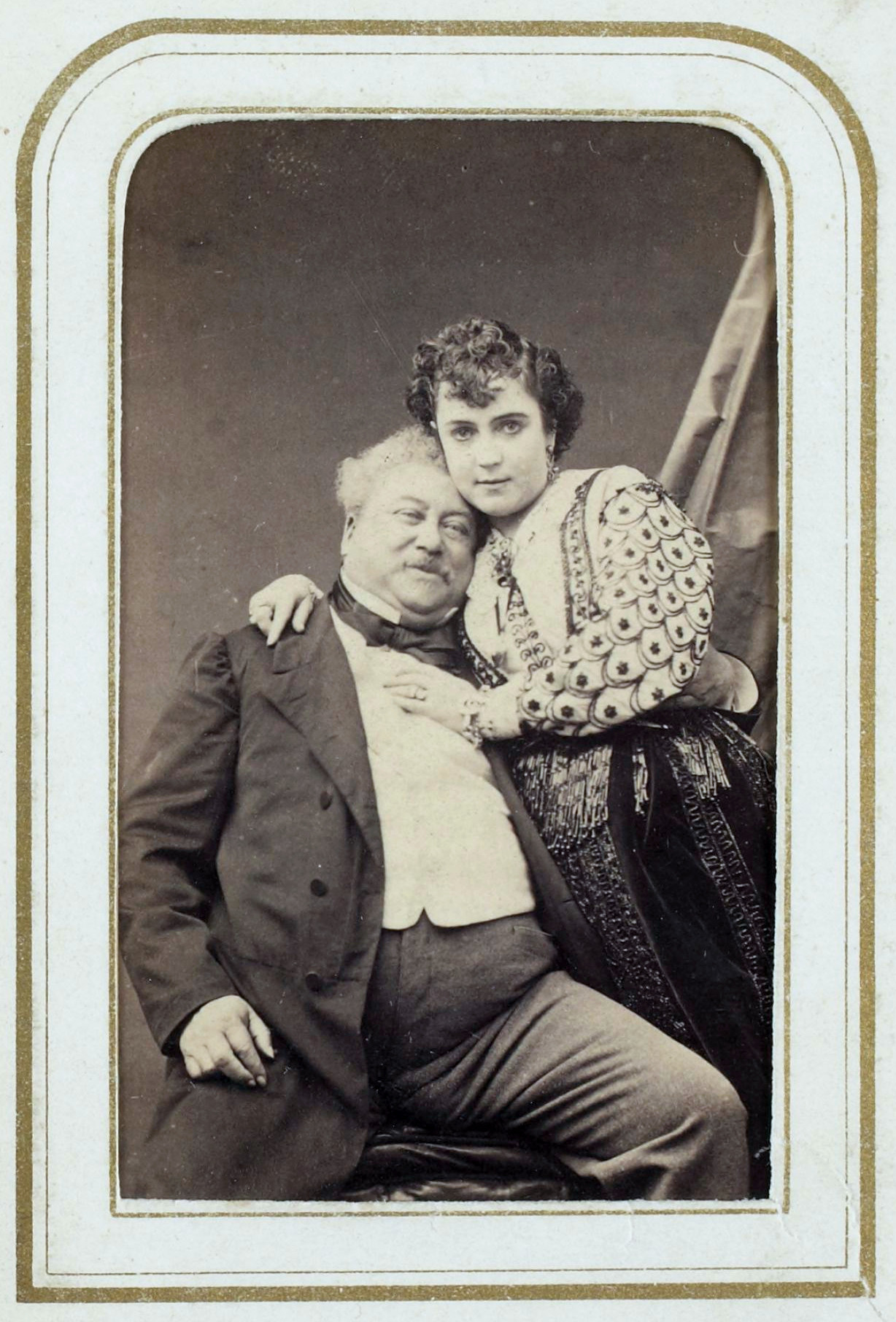
Menken with Alexandre Dumas, 1866

Playing in a sold-out run of Les pirates de la savane in Paris in 1866, Menken had an affair with the French novelist Alexandre Dumas, père, considered somewhat scandalous as he was more than twice her age. Returning to England in 1867, she struggled to attract audiences to Mazeppa and attendance fell off. During this time she had an affair with the English poet Algernon Charles Swinburne.

She fell ill in London and was forced to stop performing, struggling with poverty as a result. Few realized that the glamorous star was ill until she collapsed during rehearsal and died a few weeks later. She began preparing her poems for publication and moved back to Paris, where she died on August 10, 1868, around the age of 33. Shortly before her death, she wrote to a friend:

I am lost to art and life. Yet, when all is said and done, have I not at my age tasted more of life than most women who live to be a hundred? It is fair, then, that I should go where old people go.

Menken was believed to have died of peritonitis and/or tuberculosis. Late twentieth-century sources suggest she had cancer. She was buried in Montparnasse Cemetery, a Jewish cemetery. The inscription on her tomb reads "Thou knowest," an epitaph she had chosen from Swinburne, the poet who had said of her, “A woman who has such beautiful legs need not discuss poetry.”

In 1862, Menken had written about her public and private personae:

I have always believed myself to be possessed of two souls, one that lives on the surface of life, pleasing and pleased; the other as deep and as unfathomable as the ocean; a mystery to me and all who know me.

Her only book, Infelicia, a collection of 31 poems, was published several days after her death.

== Literary career ==
Menken wanted to be known as a writer, but her work was overshadowed by her sensational stage career and private and public life. In total, she published about 20 essays, 100 poems and a book of her collected poems, from 1855 to 1868; the book was published posthumously. Her work was not received well by contemporary critics. George Merriam Hyde, one of the most respected critics of his day, refused to critique Menken's work, saying privately that "it would be an insult to himself and his profession". Van Wyck Brooks publicly joked that "her work is the best example of unintentional wit and accidental humour".

Her early work was devoted to family and romance. After her marriage to Menken and her study of Judaism, her poetry and essays for years into the 1860s featured Jewish themes. After her marriage and divorce from Heenan and meeting with writers in New York, she changed her style, adopting some influence from Walt Whitman. She was said to be the "first poet and the only woman poet before the twentieth century" to follow his lead in using free verse. The New York Times reported that Walt Whitman had disassociated himself from Menken's work, implying he thought little of it.

Beginning in New York, her poetry expressed a wider range of emotions related to relationships, sexuality, and also about women's struggle to find a place in the world. Her collection Infelicia went through several editions and was in print until 1902. In the late nineteenth century, critics were hard on women writers, and Menken's public notoriety caused even more critical scrutiny of her poems. Later critics (such as A. R. Lloyd in his book, The Great Prize Fight and Graham Gordon in his book Master of the Ring) generally dismiss her work as being devoid of talent. Admirers included Christina Rossetti and Joaquin Miller.
