= Donna Stark =

American singer

- Also known as: Donna Gale Adelberg
- Born: Donna Gale Stark; 16 July 1948; The Bronx, New York, U.S.
- Died: 9 June 2023 (aged 74)
- Years active: Late-1970s–early 1980s

Donna Stark (born Donna Gale Stark, July 16, 1948 – June 9, 2023) was an American Country singer who recorded in the 1970s and 1980s and succeeded in reaching the Billboard Country Charts with the singles "Why Don't You Believe Me" and "Next 100 Years".

== Career ==
Her first 2 singles were "Set Me Free" and "Echoes of the Past" which received limited airplay.

After recording for several years, she entered the Billboard Country Charts in 1979 at No. 92 with the song "Why Don't You Believe Me", her biggest hit. Her next and final charting song was the lead single and title track to her 1980 album, "Next 100 Years", which peaked at #102.

== Discography ==
Singles:

RCI Records

- 1976 "Set Me Free" (7", Single)
- 1976 "Echoes of the Past" (7", Single, Promo)
- 1978 "I Wanna Be With You" (7", Single)
- 1978 "Walking Away/Fascinating Stranger" (7", Single)
- 1979 "Why Don't You Believe Me" (7", Single, Promo) US Country #92
- 1980 "The Next 100 Years" (7", Single, Promo) US Country #105

Thomas Records

- 1978 "What Does It Take (To Keep A Man Like You Satisfied)" (7", Single, Promo)

Albums:

RCI Records

- 1980 "The Next 100 Years" (LP)

== See also ==
- List of people from The Bronx
