= Jason Rogers (publisher) =

American newspaper publisher

- Born: August 5, 1868; Morrisania, Bronx, New York, U.S.
- Died: April 26, 1932 (aged 63); Falmouth, Massachusetts, U.S.
- Occupation: Newspaper publisher
- Known for: Publisher of The New York Globe
- Relatives: William Cauldwell (grandfather)

Jason Rogers (August 5, 1868 – April 26, 1932) was an early 20th-century newspaper publisher best known for his success as a publisher of The New York Globe.

== Background ==
Rogers was born in Morrisania, now part of the Bronx on August 5, 1868. A grandson of William Cauldwell, publisher of the New York Sunday Mercury, Rogers was allowed to start working for that paper when he was 12. By 1893–94, Rogers became the paper's publisher while attempting to become a daily publication, a venture which failed in 1896. Rogers then bounced around to a number of papers including the Providence News, Chicago Inter Ocean, Chicago Journal, and New York Sun. In 1904, he became a manager of the Commercial Advertiser, a low-circulation paper (around 12,000) which traced its founding back to 1793 by Noah Webster. The paper was transformed as of February 1, 1904, into The Globe and Commercial Advertiser, commonly referred to as The New York Globe. The price was cut from two cents to one, and circulation jumped to 100,000 almost overnight. In 1910, Rogers became a publisher.

He published the book Newspaper Building in 1918.

In 1923, the Globe was bought out by the somewhat notorious newspaper-consolidator Frank Munsey, who "merged" the Globe into the New York Sun, thus ending the "oldest daily newspaper in the United States" at that time. Rogers' dedication to high quality and serious reporting was a bit at odds with Munsey's typical operations, and as he had no ownership in the paper, he had no control over this turn of events. A year later, Rogers attempted to create a new paper in the mold of Globe, but was unable to draw sufficient investors.

Rogers was also instrumental to the founding of the Audit Bureau of Circulations (founded in 1914), for which he drafted the original plan—to provide objective methods of verifying newspaper circulation. He also served for a brief time (1927–28) as the general manager of Kansas City Journal-Post.

Rogers died in Falmouth, Massachusetts (where he had moved in 1929) on April 26, 1932.
