= The New York Globe =

Former daily newspaper in New York City

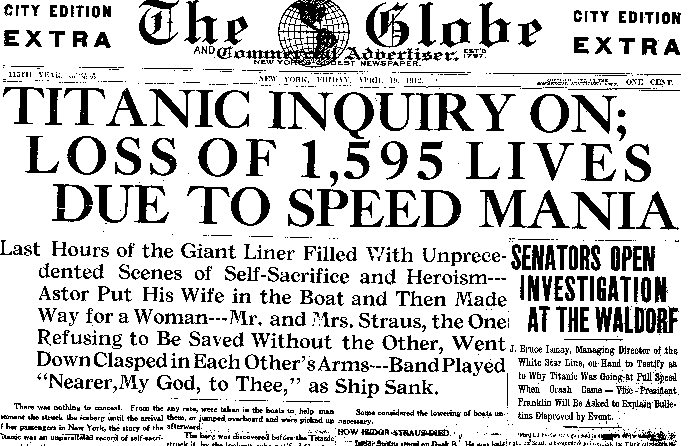
- Cover page of the Globe from April 1912
- Type: Daily newspaper
- Format: Tabloid
- Publisher: Jason Rogers (1910–1923)
- Founded: February 1, 1904; 122 years ago
- Ceased publication: 1923; 103 years ago; merged into The New York Sun
- Language: English
- Headquarters: New York City

The Globe and Commercial Advertiser, more commonly called The New York Globe or The New York Evening Globe, was a daily New York City newspaper published from 1904 to 1923, when it was bought and merged into The New York Sun. It is not related to a New York City-based Saturday family newspaper, The Globe, which was founded by James M. Place in 1892 and published until at least 1899.

== History ==
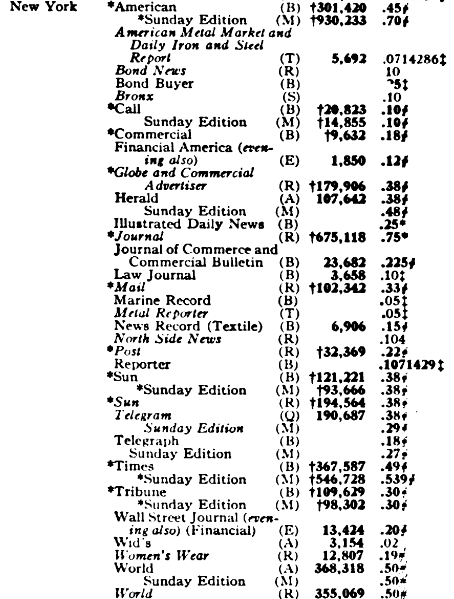
Circulation figures for New York City newspapers appearing in Editor & Publisher in 1919. The Globe's circulation was 179,906.

The Globe was launched on February 1, 1904. It was a wholly revamped one-cent version of the two-cent paper known as the Commercial Advertiser which dated back to 1793. The official name of the new paper was The Globe and Commercial Advertiser, though it was more typically referred to as the Globe.

Jason Rogers, grandson of William Cauldwell, who got his start in the newspaper business at Cauldwell's Sunday Mercury, helped launch the Globe as assistant publisher. He became publisher in 1910.

In 1912, the Globe was one of a cooperative of four newspapers, including the Chicago Daily News, The Boston Globe, and the Philadelphia Bulletin, to form the Associated Newspapers syndicate.

The Globe was known for originating Robert Ripley's popular feature Ripley's Believe it or Not! in 1918. In 1916, the paper distributed the theatrical documentary Germany on the Firing Line, under the titles The Globe's War Films and The Evening Globe's "Germany at the Firing Line". One publisher was Samuel Strauss. Notable contributors included a fledgling Maxwell Anderson, and cartoonist Percy Crosby, then a sports columnist.

=== Sale ===
Frank Munsey bought the paper in 1923. Munsey, who consolidated a number of papers, then merged the Globe into the New York Sun, thus ending the "oldest daily newspaper in the United States" at that time.
