= Walton McCarthy =

Walton W. McCarthy
- Born: 1951 (age 74–75); Bronx, New York, U.S.
- Education: Montana State University (B.E.)
- Occupation: Businessman

Walton W. McCarthy (born 1951) is an American businessman and mechanical engineer and is known as an advocate for creating scientific standards for the underground shelter industry. McCarthy is a Principle Mechanical Engineer with NORAD Shelter Systems LLC, a Texas underground blast shelter company formed 2016. He is formerly the president of Radius Engineering.

== Early life ==
Walton McCarthy was born in 1951 to Jacqueline and Robert McCarthy, and raised in The Bronx NY. He graduated with a Bachelor of Science degree from Montana State University in 1974. McCarthy has two children, Darik McCarthy and Alexis McCarthy. He is married to LaTonia McCarthy of Plano, TX.

== Career ==
Overhearing a sad conversation in 1978 prompted McCarthy to begin his bomb shelter career. A family he knew had a suicide pact in place should nuclear war fallout cause radiation poisoning. Their young daughter asked "if" she grew up, could she be a designer. McCarthy decided to dedicate his career to protecting people from the devastating effects of nuclear war. He started building bomb shelters in 1978. He worked with the Department of Defense and multiple governments and educational institutions to determine how to create appropriate protection from nuclear explosions.

He is a member of the American Society of Mechanical Engineers, the American Society of Testing Materials, and the Composite Fabricators Association.

McCarthy was the subject of two television shows and numerous radio programs. McCarthy was featured in American Survival Guide for his S16 underground shelter and his Self-Contained Underground Power Plant (SCUPP). He was asked to bring an underground shelter to COLPRO in 2004.

Walton McCarthy sold his company THETA Technologies to Larry Azure in 1994 which later was successfully public on the NASDAQ stock exchange as OMEGA Environmental using McCarthy's patents. Later Walton McCarthy was the plaintiff in a federal lawsuit against THETA Technologies which was settled out of court. In 1995 Walton McCarthy formed the company known as Radius Engineering. He is currently a consultant for NORAD, MSCG and numerous other defense contractors.

=== Underground shelter standards advocate ===
McCarthy established the very first guidelines for effective designing and manufacturing of underground shelters in his 1983 book The Nuclear Shelterist. In this book McCarthy coined the term shelterist to mean an underground shelter occupant, distinguishing his customers from what are now known as "survivalists" and "preppers". A shelterist uses the shelter to prepare for a disaster; a "prepper" uses food and guns to prepare for a disaster, but not necessarily a shelter. However, it was his second book, Principles of Protection: U. S. Handbook of NBC Weapon Fundamentals and Shelter Engineering Design Standards, which became "The Bible of the Shelter Industry". This book establishes nuclear weapons effects tables that are not founded in any book to date.

McCarthy has argued for many years to distinguish between survival shelters and nuclear shelters, as survival shelters were not designed to protect people from nuclear weapons. McCarthy also created a committee of university, corporate and government scientists to create standards for the underground shelter industry. The committee included experts from the Nuclear Engineering Laboratory at the University of Illinois, the Biomedical and Environmental Research Institute, Oak Ridge National Laboratory and Chemical Division, Edgewood Arsenal, Stonybrook University, FEMA, Scientific Applications International Corp., Northeast Consulting Engineers, the University of NH and the National Bureau of Standards.

McCarthy has designed and installed over 1400 underground shelters and published twelve patents. McCarthy and several of his shelter companies have been featured in The New York Times, KSAT ABC, The Wall Street Journal, CBS News, Wired Magazine, Popular Mechanics, and CNN and multiple other publications.

== Patents ==
McCarthy was issued numerous patents: Us Provisional Patent No. 62460297 EMP Shielded Generator Housing

Us Provisional Patent No. 62460286 Truss Air Manifold Assembly

Us Provisional Patent No. 62460281 S.E.A.M. Severe Environment Air Filtration NBC

Us Provisional Patent No. 62460237 Steel Hex Arch Underground Shelter

US Patent 4,440,861 Solar Apparatus

US Patent 4,345,974 A Solar Fermentation

US Patent 4,660,334 THETA Blast Cell

US Patent 4,884,709 Underground Storage Tank

US Patent 4,934,553A Above Ground Waste Tank

US Patent 5,115,613 THETA Blast Cell

US Patent 6,385,919 Disaster Shelter

US Patent 06296693-01 NBC Life Cell

US Patent 6,438,907 B1 Entranceway and Disaster Shelter

US Patent 63,851,919 B1 Disaster Shelter

US Patent 8,987,925 B2 Underground Power Plant

US Patent 7,744,682 B2 A Multi-Chamber Air Sterilization

== Books ==
McCarthy wrote two books defining standards for the underground shelter industry:

The Nuclear Shelterist, Walton W. McCarthy, Todd and Honeywell, 354pp, 1983

Principles of Protection: U.S. Handbook of NBC Weapon Fundamentals and Shelter Engineering Design Standards, 6th Ed. Walton W. McCarthy 2013, 727 pp. Brown Books.
