= Mwalim =

Native American educator and musician

Mwalim Peters MS, MFA
- Mwalim
- Born: Morgan James Peters; June 6, 1968 (age 58); Bronx, New York, U.S.
- Other name: Mwalim DaPhunkee Professor
- Citizenship: Mashpee Wampanoag Tribe and U.S.
- Education: BA: Boston University (1991)
- Alma mater: MFA: Goddard College (2006), MS: Boston University (1993)
- Occupations: professor, musician, writer, performing artist
- Employer: University of Massachusetts, Dartmouth
- Organization(s): singer and keyboardist of The GroovaLottos
- Known for: Black Aesthics scholarship, fiction, theater, poetry, film, music
- Awards: American Academy of Arts and Sciences
- Website: daphunkeeprofessor.com

Mwalim (Morgan James Peters, born June 6, 1968), also known as Mwalim *7 and Mwalim DaPhunkee Professor, is a Native American performing artist, writer, and educator. He is a tenured associate professor of English and former director of Black Studies at the University of Massachusetts Dartmouth. He is also a founding member of The GroovaLottos, a multiple Grammy Award-nominated soul-funk-blues band, for which he is the keyboard player, a vocalist, and the resident songwriter.

== Early life and education ==
Born Morgan James Peters to a West Indian American (Barbados) mother and Mashpee Wampanoag Tribe father, Mwalim grew up in both the Northeast Bronx and Mashpee, Massachusetts. Mwalim's first instrument was the viola which he began studying at the age of ten, playing in his school orchestra, the Bronx Borough-wide Orchestra, and studied privately at Bronx House music school. He auditioned for and attended Music & Art High School (Now LaGuardia School for the Arts), and was interested in music and short-story writing from an early age. As a student at Music & Art he studied viola privately at the 3rd Street Music School and also began studying piano and composition with his grandfather, noted band leader, arranger, and record producer for Decca and Southern Records in the 1920s, '30s and '40s, Allan H. Nurse. Mwalim also began his career as a studio session player at age 16, adding string parts to various recordings and becoming one of the youngest session players in EMI Records history.

Mwalim went on to major in music composition and history at Boston University, earning a BA degree there in 1991 and an MS degree in 1993.

During this time, he also worked as an intern and session musician at various recording studios around the Boston and New York City, most notably, Jazzy J Recording Studio in the Bronx. He also became a part of the college's Black Drama Collective as a stage band musician and sketch writer. Mwalim joined New African Company in 1991, where he received his formal training in theater arts and education.

Mwalim earned his MFA in creative writing from Goddard College in July 2006. His focus was playwriting.

== Career ==
After college and graduate school, Mwalim chose to settle on Cape Cod as opposed to back to New York. He worked with a small group of local performers to co-found Oversoul Theatre Collective, Inc., and became the group's artistic director. He has used music, theater and storytelling as a platform to explore the Black and Native American experience; and the American phenomenon of having to choose one race, despite the rhetoric of the American melting pot. He has called himself a "Black Wampanoag."

In 2000, Mwalim became a part of the Lincoln Center Theatre's Director's Lab program, and later held residencies at the Harlem Theatre Company, The POINT CDC/Live From The Edge theater, and the Bronx Writer's Center, where he presented his original plays and performance pieces as well as taught workshops in creative writing, filmmaking and drama. He was also a very active presenter and performer at the Nuyorican Poet's Cafe, the Afrikan Theatre, and The Baggot Inn in Greenwich Village, where he led the house band. His plays also began getting picked up for productions by various Off-Broadway and Off-Off Broadway theater groups as well as productions throughout the US, Canada, the U.K. and the Caribbean.

His award-winning one-man show "A Party at the Crossroads" is subtitled the tales and adventures of a Black Indian growing up in a Jewish neighborhood, has been presented at the Mashantucket Pequot Museum in Connecticut and as a part of the Indian Summer series at the American Indian Community House in New York City. His performance piece, based on memories of Mashpee of the past, "Backwoods People" was presented at the 1999 National Black Theatre Festival in Winston-Salem, NC. His romantic comedy, Working Things Out was a hit at the 2005 festival.

Mwalim became a professor of English and African American studies at UMass Dartmouth in 2003 and the Director of Black Studies (formerly African & African American Studies) in 2011. He sometimes calls himself "DaPhunkee Professor."

According to Black Masks Magazine, Mwalim is considered a leading voice in the new generation of artists.

Some of his musical recordings have won awards from the New England Urban Music Awards

WGBH, Boston's PBS television station, selected Mwalim as a Filmmaker-In-Residence. He will be producing a film adaptation of Look At My Shorts, a collection of Mwalim's short plays exploring contemporary Black Indian experiences in Massachusetts.

== Books ==
1. Land of the Black Squirrels: A Bronx Boheme Novel (New York: Thirty-three Pages, 2020)
2. A Mixed Medicine Bag: Original BlackWampanoag Folklore (Roxbury, MA: Talking Drum Press, 2007)
3. A Mixed Medicine Bag: 7 Original a Black-Wampanoag Folklore (Mashpee, MA: Talking Drum Press, 1998)

== Plays and performance works ==
1. The Barber of Seville Street (1995)
2. Things I've Enjoyed Telling White Folks: The Quaker & Unitarian Monologues (1997)
3. Out! By The Roots!!! (1997)
4. A Party at the Crossroads (1998)
5. Guess Who's Rockin' The Party... (1999)
6. OM! A Street Corner Griot's Comedy (2000)
7. Horror In The Bronx (2002)
8. Working Things Out (2003)
9. Meanwhile, Elsewhere...: A Collection of Short Plays (2005)
10. WETU In The City (2007)
11. Seek & Ye Shall Find (1 of the Among Brothers Trilogy) (2008)
12. You're An Indian?? (2009)
13. Knock & It Shall Be Opened (2 of the Among Brothers Trilogy) (2010)
14. Ask & It Shall Be Given (3 of the Among Brothers Trilogy) (2014)
15. LEGACY (2016)
16. Listen To Sipu (2021)

== Discography ==
1. "Her Groove" 12' Single (1990 Midnight Groove Recordings)
2. "Voices Of My Ancestors" E.P. (1995, MGR/MFV Group)
3. "Thief In The Night" CD single (2000, MGR/OTC Records)
4. "Jazzy- Soul Club Grooves" Vinyl/E.P. (2001 Midnight Groove Recordings/ OTC Records)
5. "The Liberation Sessions" CD/Album (2010 MGR/LM3/ Lore Music Group)
6. "DEEP Soul Chants & Hollers" CD/Album (2012 MGR/LM3)
7. "Awakened By A Noon Day Sun" CD/Album (2014 MGR/LM3/ Spirit Wind Records)
8. "Ask Yo' Mama" by The GroovaLottos CD/Album (2017 MGR/LM3/Sing Keepers, LTD.) 9. "Downstreeter Suite Digital Album (2021 MGR/LM3) 10. "Mama's Hamper" a remixtape by The GroovaLottos Digital Album (2021 MGR/LM3)
