= Hilton White =

American basketball coach

Biographical details
- Education: Benedict College

Coaching career (HC unless noted)

Men's basketball
- 1966–70: American International (Asst.)
- 1970–77: American International
- 1979–85: Westfield State

Women's basketball
- 1985–90: Westfield State

Hilton White (1932–1990) was an American basketball coach who was a recreation and playground director for the New York City Department of Parks and Recreation and head coach of the American International Yellow Jackets men's basketball team and Westfield State University's men's and women's basketball teams.

== Early life ==
White graduated from Dewitt Clinton High School in The Bronx and Benedict College in Columbia, South Carolina. At Benedict, he earned letters in basketball, football, baseball, and track. After college, he joined the United States Army and was stationed in Europe and at Fort Bliss, Texas. He remained involved in sports, playing and coaching basketball and managing athletics and recreation for his battalion. He became a private first class in the Army.

== Cauldwell Playground ==
After his discharge, he returned to New York City and became the recreation supervisor at Cauldwell Playground. He founded a local basketball team called Bronx Falcons, which played in a number of big tournaments in the city. Three of White's former players, Willie Worsley, Nevil Shed, and Willie Cager, played for the Texas Western Miners and in 1966 were part of the first all-black starting five to win the NCAA Division I championship. Another one of his protégés, Nate Archibald, played 14 years in the National Basketball Association.

== American International ==
In 1966, White joined American International College as an assistant basketball coach and director of the school's intramural athletic program. In 1970 he was promoted to head coach. After seven seasons he resigned to become a full-time member of the school's faculty, serving as an assistant professor of psychology and sociology and as the school's affirmative action officer.

== Westfield State ==
White returned to coaching in 1979 at Westfield State University. The Owls compiled a 56–68 record in his five seasons as head coach and appeared in the 1985 NCAA Division III men's basketball tournament. He then served as coach of Westfield State's women's program from 1985 to 1990.

== Death and legacy ==
White died in the summer of 1990 from complications of a stroke. He was 57. In 2009, Cauldwell Playground was renamed Hilton White Playground and the stretch of Cauldwell Avenue from 161st Street to 163rd Street was renamed Hilton White Way.
