= New York Atlas =

- Type: Sunday-only newspaper
- Format: broadsheet
- Founded: 1838
- Ceased publication: 1881(?)
- Headquarters: Manhattan
- OCLC number: 9424671

The New York Atlas was a Sunday newspaper in New York City which was published from 1838 until the 1880s.

The paper was founded as a Sunday-only paper in 1838 by Anson Herrick and Jesse A. Fell as the Sunday Morning Atlas. It began publication on August 12, 1838. Frederick West soon joined as an editor and partner in the paper, Fell departed, and John F. Ropes also joined as a publisher, and the publishers then were known as "Herrick, West, and Ropes".

By November 1842, its reported circulation was 4,500, ranking it second (after the New York Herald) among the five New York papers who were publishing on Sunday at the time.

The paper continued operation under Herrick's sons Carleton Moses and Anson after Anson Sr. died in 1868, and ceased publication sometime in the early 1880s.

According to Library of Congress holdings information, the paper's title was the Sunday Morning Atlas from 1838–40, The Atlas from 1840-53, and the New-York Atlas from 1853-81.

== Notable contributors ==
- P. T. Barnum, who published over 100 letters as a "European correspondent" for the paper, as well as a serialized novel in 1841, The Adventures of an Adventurer
- Ada Clare, whose poetry was first published in the Atlas in 1855.
- Bret Harte, who later became well for his accounts of pioneering life in California, had his first writings published in the Atlas at age 11, a poem called "Autumnal Musings".
- Walt Whitman, whose treatise Manly Health and Training was published in weekly installments starting in September 1858.
