= Cosco Capital =

Holding company

- Company type: Public
- Traded as: PSE: COSCO
- Industry: Conglomerate
- Founded: January 19, 1988; 38 years ago, in Manila, Philippines
- Founder: Luis Co Chi Kiat
- Headquarters: 3/F New Tabacalera Bldg., No. 900 Romualdez St., Paco, Manila
- Area served: Philippines
- Key people: Lucio L. Co (Chairman); Susan P. Co (Vice Chairperson); Leonardo B. Dayao (President and CEO)
- Revenue: ▲ ₱240.5 billion (2024)
- Net income: ▲ ₱15.49 billion (2024)
- Total assets: ▲ ₱249.4 billion (2024)
- Total equity: ▲ ₱154.6 billion (2024
- Owners: Co family (78.6%)
- Number of employees: 14,000 (2024)
- Subsidiaries: Puregold; S&R Membership Shopping; The Keepers Holdings; Ellimac Prime Holdings and other subsidiaries

Cosco Capital, Inc. is a diversified holding company based in Manila, Philippines. Founded in 1988, it has grown into one of the country's largest conglomerates, with dominant businesses in grocery retail, specialty retail, real estate, liquor distribution, and oil & mining. It is publicly listed on the Philippine Stock Exchange (ticker: COSCO). Cosco's core businesses include Puregold Price Club supermarkets and S&R Membership Shopping (grocery retail), Office Warehouse (office and school supplies), The Keepers wine & liquor distribution, real estate development (Ellimac, Fertuna, etc.), and Alcorn Petroleum & Minerals (oil and mining). The company is closely associated with businessman Lucio L. Co (chairman) and his family, whose group holds about 79% of the shares.

Puregold and S&R remain “household names” in Philippine retail and The Keepers has a near-monopoly on imported liquor by volume. According to Fortune, the company ranked 88th among the largest companies in Southeast Asia in 2024, with revenues of US$4.1 billion. It employed around 14,000 people.

== History ==
Cosco Capital began as an oil and gas exploration company. The company was originally incorporated on January 19, 1988, as Alcorn Petroleum and Minerals Corporation (later Alcorn Gold Resources Corporation), focused on oil and mineral exploration.

On September 8, 1998, Puregold Price Club was founded by Lucio Co and his wife Susan Co. Its first branch opened on December 12, 1998, as the anchor tenant of Liberty Center (now Mandala Park) along Shaw Boulevard in Mandaluyong.

In January 2000, the firm's board and shareholders approved a new charter: it became a broad retail holding company and changed its name to Cosco Capital, Inc. on January 13, 2000. This reflected the vision of founder Luis Co Chi Kiat (the family patriarch) and his son Lucio Co to diversify beyond oil. Thereafter Cosco Capital gradually acquired and built up new businesses in retail, real estate, liquor distribution, and other sectors.

In the 2000s and 2010s, Cosco expanded its retail and property ventures. It became the majority owner of Puregold Price Club, Inc., a supermarket chain. In 2008 and 2010 Puregold introduced new formats (Puregold Jr. and Puregold Extra) to reach more customers.

In 2012, Fertuna Holdings (a Cosco affiliate) co-developed Harbor Point Mall in the Subic Freeport with Ayala Land, which opened in September 2012 with a Puregold anchor tenant. Around the same time, Cosco acquired Office Warehouse, Inc. (founded 1998) to enter the specialty retail sector.

In 2012-2013 Puregold (Cosco's supermarket arm) also acquired Kareila Management Inc. (owner of S&R Membership Shopping), giving Cosco a substantial stake in S&R's six warehouse clubs.

Cosco also built up a wine and spirits distribution group. Through its affiliate The Keepers Holdings, Inc., Cosco owned Montosco, Meritus, Premier Wine & Spirits, and Fertuna Distributions. These companies collectively became the Philippines’ largest importer and distributor of wine and liquor, with over 74% of import volumes by 2020.

In June 2021 Cosco restructured this business by spinning off the liquor subsidiaries into The Keepers Holdings (a separate listed company). Specifically, Cosco exchanged its 100% ownership of Montosco, Meritus and Premier for 11.25 billion new shares of The Keepers at P2.00/share. This share swap created a more focused beverage-distribution listing.

In 2022 Cosco entered a joint venture (JV) with Thailand’s Siam Global House Public Co. to build one-stop home improvement “warehouse” outlets in the Philippines. However, in late 2024 Cosco announced it terminated that planned P500-million JV due to “current market conditions”. The company said in December 2024 that management of both parties mutually decided not to proceed with the venture.

== Services and Products ==
Cosco Capital operates through five main business segments:

=== Grocery Retail ===
The group's flagship retail unit is Puregold Price Club, Inc. Puregold opened its first supermarket in Mandaluyong (Metro Manila) in 1998 and over 25 years has become a leading grocery chain. It expanded nationwide via both organic store growth and acquisitions. Notably, Puregold acquired S&R Membership Shopping (a US-style warehouse club founded in 2006) in 2012, adding six S&R outlets to its network. Puregold also introduced smaller formats (Puregold Jr. in 2008 and Puregold Extra in 2010) to reach different market segments. Combined, Puregold and S&R under Cosco's umbrella command one of the largest market shares in Philippine grocery retail. The retail business accounted for 70% of total net income in H1 2025.

=== Specialty Retail (Office Supplies) ===
Office Warehouse, Inc. (founded in 1998) serves business, institutional and educational customers with office and school supplies. It operates roughly 87 retail outlets (as of 2023) across Metro Manila and Luzon, including “store-within-a-store” sections in Puregold supermarkets. Office Warehouse grew rapidly (16% annual sales growth pre-pandemic) and remains Cosco's specialist retailer for non-food products.

=== Wine & Liquor Distribution ===
Through its affiliate The Keepers Holdings, Inc., Cosco is the dominant distributor of imported alcoholic and specialty beverages in the Philippines. The Keepers wholly owns Montosco, Meritus, Premier Wine & Spirits and Fertuna Distributions – four of the country's main liquor importers. In 2020 these companies together held about 74% of the market by volume (and 66.9% by retail value) for imported spirits. Keepers holds exclusive Philippine distributorships for numerous global wine and liquor brands.

=== Real Estate & Property ===
Cosco's real estate arm is led by Ellimac Prime Holdings, Inc. (established 2012 by merging four property firms). As of 2022 Ellimac owned 55 commercial properties across Metro Manila and Central/Northern Luzon, including malls, offices, and leasehold land. Other Cosco-related property companies include Fertuna Holdings Corp. (developer of Harbor Point Mall, Subic), NE Pacific Shopping Centers (owner of NE Pacific Mall in Nueva Ecija), Nation Realty, Inc. (builder of the “999 Shopping Mall” bazaar mall in Binondo), and Patagonia Holdings Corp. (holds 1.3 hectares of land parcels in Bonifacio Global City, used by S&R).Through these, Cosco has major mall and leasing businesses. Cosco also owns Pure Petroleum Corp. (fuel storage terminals in Subic Bay, 88.5M-liter capacity).

=== Oil & Mining ===
Cosco's non-retail legacy is handled by Alcorn Petroleum and Minerals Corp., a wholly-owned subsidiary set up on July 5, 2013. Alcorn pursues exploration in energy and mining – for example holding Service Contracts for oil/gas in the West Linapacan and Bonita-Cadlao offshore areas, and a limestone project in Leyte. This segment contributes only a small part of Cosco's revenues compared to retail and distribution.

== Corporate affairs ==
Cosco's board is led by Chairman Lucio L. Co and Vice Chairman Susan P. Co. The company's President (and an executive director) is Leonardo B. Dayao. The Co family retains control: as of June 30, 2025, the “Lucio L. Co Group” held about 78.6% of Cosco's common shares. Cosco is headquartered at 3/F New Tabacalera Bldg., No. 900 Romualdez St., Paco, Manila.

Cosco Capital is a publicly listed company on the Philippine Stock Exchange (PSE). The company's shares are included in Philippine indices, and its market capitalization is roughly ₱51.5 billion as of mid-2025. For fiscal year 2024, Cosco reported gross revenues of about ₱240.5 billion and net income after tax of roughly ₱15.49 billion. Its total assets as of end-2024 were about ₱249.4 billion. As of the first half of 2025, Cosco's diversified segments continued to post double-digit growth (e.g. H1 2025 revenue of ₱119.5 billion and net income ₱7.60 billion). Cosco pays dividends on its common shares – recent yields have been around 5–6% annually.
