= Warehouse club =

Retail store offering merchandise at wholesale prices

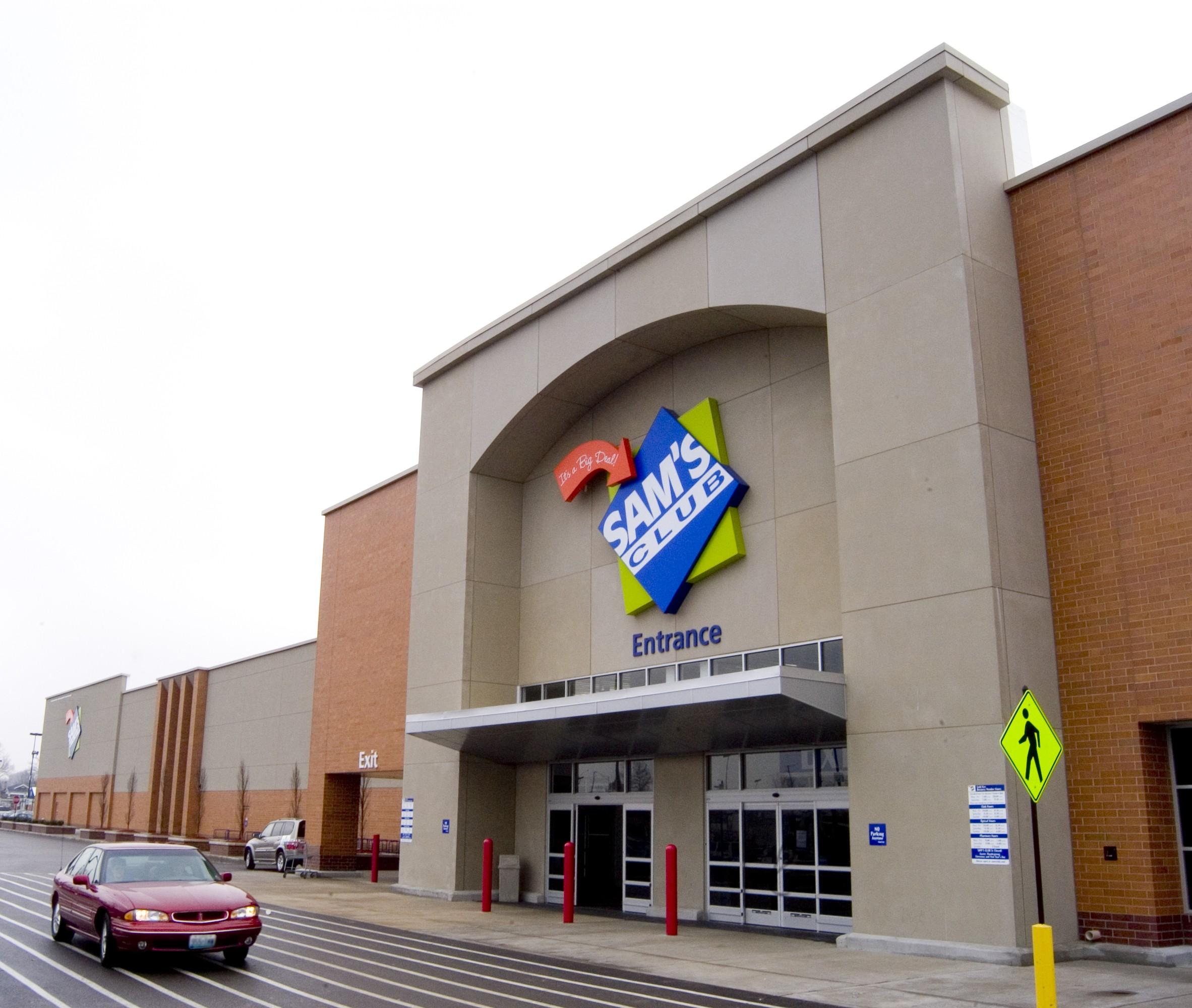
Exterior of a Sam's Club warehouse club store in Maplewood, Missouri, a suburb of St. Louis

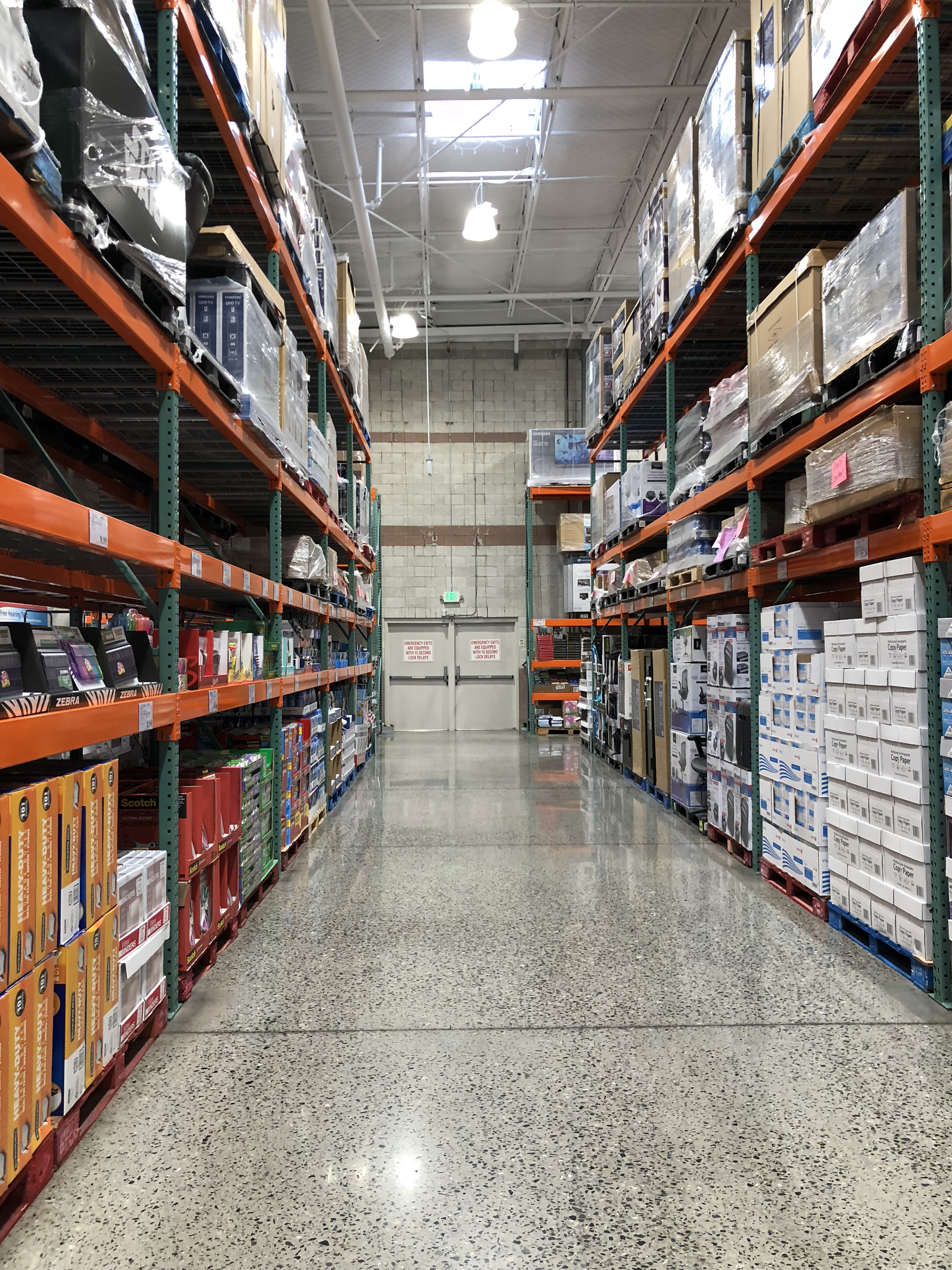
Consumers pick most items directly off pallets in retail-ready packaging (Costco).

A warehouse club (or wholesale club) is a wholesale retail store, in which customers have to pay for membership and present proof of membership to complete a purchase. The clubs are able to keep prices low due to the no-frills format of the stores, which makes these clubs attractive to both ordinary consumers and small business owners. They usually sell a wide variety of merchandise despite a limited assortment.

They are distinguished from traditional cash-and-carry wholesale businesses in that their warehouses are substantially larger in size, and they do not cater purely to businesses but also allow some or all types of consumers to obtain memberships. They are also distinguished from warehouse stores in that they usually charge annual membership fees and require presentation of proof of membership to both enter the warehouse and complete a purchase. A warehouse club is a retail format within the club channel industry sector. Warehouse club superficially resembles that in a consumers' cooperative, but lacks key elements including cooperative ownership and democratic member control. The use of members' prices without cooperative ownership is also sometimes used in bars and casinos.

== History ==
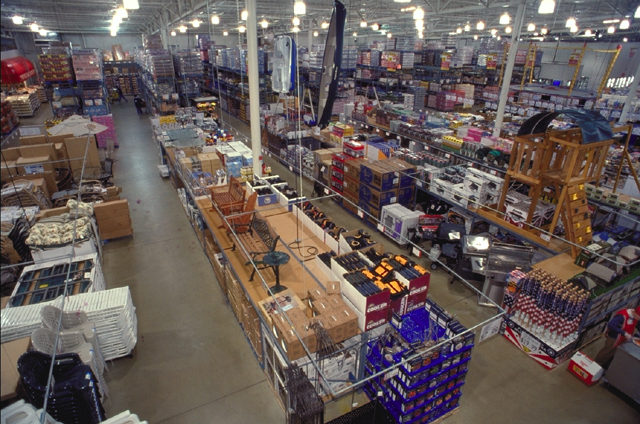
A BJ's Wholesale club in Virginia

In 1976, Sol Price (who in 1954 founded FedMart, an early US discount store) and his son Robert Price founded Price Club in San Diego, as their first warehouse club. In a 1988 article, The New York Times Magazine credited Price Club as the "pioneer" of the warehouse club retail format. After his departure from FedMart, Sol Price realized that small businesses in San Diego either ordered directly from four or five large wholesalers or they bought locally from relatively small cash-and-carry wholesalers. Therefore, Price Club was originally positioned as a much larger, volume-oriented version of the cash-and-carry wholesale format, meaning that prospective members were required to present resale certificates or professional licenses. Based on a customer's suggestion, Price Club subsequently allowed government employees to apply for memberships. This privilege was later extended to employees of utility companies and hospitals, followed by members of certain credit unions and savings deposit clubs.

In 1982, the discount pioneer John Geisse founded The Wholesale Club of Indianapolis, which he sold to Sam's Club (a division of Walmart) in 1991.

In 1983, James (Jim) Sinegal and Jeffrey H. Brotman opened the first Costco warehouse in Seattle. Sinegal had started in wholesale distribution by working for Sol Price at FedMart.

In 1983, Kmart's Pace Membership Warehouse (later sold to Sam's Club) started operations. That same year, Sam Walton opened the first Sam's Club on April 7, in Midwest City, Oklahoma.

In 1984, former The Wholesale Club executives founded BJ's Wholesale Club, owned by Zayre.

As of 1988, Price Club was the leader of the warehouse club industry, with over 40 warehouses operating across the United States and Canada. Stephen F. Mandel, Jr., then a Goldman Sachs analyst, called the warehouse club "the greatest revolution in retailing in the last 10 years."

By 1992, Sam's Club had surged past both Price Club and Costco to become the industry leader with 222 warehouse clubs. The four other major players were Pace (95 clubs), Costco (87 clubs), Price Club (80 clubs) and BJ's (31 clubs). Analysts were already seeing signs of market saturation along the West Coast of the United States, the first region in which warehouse clubs were developed.

In 1993, Costco and Price Club agreed to merge operations, after Price declined an offer from Sam Walton and Walmart to merge Price Club with Sam's Club. Costco's business model and size were similar to those of Price Club, which made the merger more natural for both companies. The combined company took the name PriceCostco, and memberships became universal, meaning that a Price Club member could use their membership to shop at Costco and vice versa. PriceCostco boasted 206 locations generating $16 billion in annual sales. PriceCostco was initially led by executives from both companies, but in 1994, the Price brothers left the company to form Price Enterprises, a warehouse club chain in Central America and the Caribbean unrelated to the current Costco.

In November 1993, 91 of 113 PACE Membership Warehouse locations were sold by KMart to Sam's Club. The value of the sale was not disclosed. At the time, there were 326 Sam's Clubs. The sale was expected to close in January 1994.

In 1997, Costco changed its name to Costco Wholesale Corporation, and all remaining Price Club locations were rebranded as Costco.

As of 2009, the three largest warehouse club chains operating in the United States are BJs, Costco, and Sam's Club. BJ's Wholesale Club is one of the smaller competitors, with stores located primarily in the Eastern United States. Costco and Sam's Club are the largest chains. Costco has locations in 13 other nations and regions: Australia, Canada, China, France, Iceland, Japan, Korea, Mexico, New Zealand, Spain, Sweden, Taiwan, and the United Kingdom. Sam's Club, a division of Walmart, claims a membership base of 47 million persons and 602 stores across the United States (as of June 2019).

== Examples ==
- BJ's Wholesale Club, operates in the U.S. only
- City Club, operates in Mexico
- Costco, operates in the U.S., Canada, Mexico, the UK, Iceland, Australia, New Zealand, Sweden, Spain, France, South Korea, Mainland China, Japan and Taiwan
- Makro, operates in South Africa
- Metro AG (branded as Makro in some countries), headquartered in Germany, majority control in different regions by multiple third parties, Metro AG has 674 wholesale stores in 24 countries; business customers only.
- PriceSmart, operates in Central America and Caribbean; previously operated in Asia-Pacific region
- Sam's Club, operates in the U.S., Mexico, China and Brazil
- Selgros, operates in Germany, Poland, Romania and Russia
- Wholesale Club, operates in Canada
- S&R Membership Shopping, operates in the Philippines
- Landers Superstore, operates in the Philippines

=== Defunct ===
- American Wholesale Club (1986–1989)
- Buyers Club, a Denver-based independently owned chain
- Club Wholesale, turned into office supplies stores, then folded
- Fedco, bankruptcy in 1999 (most stores were bought by Target Stores)
- GEM & GEX Membership Department Stores (required membership like a warehouse club)
- Gemco, 1959–1986, owned by Lucky Stores
- HomeClub, a home improvement warehouse, later became HomeBase and then folded in 2000
- Max-Club, owned by SuperValu (United States)
- PACE Membership Warehouse, owned by Kmart, merged with Sam's Club
- Price Club, merged with Costco in 1993
- Price Savers Wholesale Club, merged with PACE Warehouse Club, then merged with Sam's Club
- Sam's Club, in Canada 2003–2009
- SourceClub, owned by Meijer, from 1992 to 1994. Only had seven locations, all in Michigan, but helped loosen restrictions on who can become members industry-wide.
- Super Saver, merged with Sam's Club (Southeast US)
- The Wholesale Club, merged with Sam's Club
- Titan Warehouse Club Inc., an early warehouse concept in Canada based in Calgary with locations in Toronto/Kitchener/Stoney Creek areas in the 1985–1994
- Warehouse Club, was a public company

== See also ==
- Bulk foods
- Cash and carry (wholesale)
- Hypermarket
- Shelf-ready packaging
