= Hugo Mann =

German businessman (1913–2008)

- Born: 17 November 1913; Laupheim, Germany
- Died: 20 December 2008 (aged 95); Baden-Baden, Germany
- Citizenship: Germany
- Occupation: Retailing

Hugo Mann (17 November 1913 – 20 December 2008) was a German businessman.

== Early life ==
He was born in Laupheim. As a youth, Hugo Mann worked at his grandfather's shop in Karlsruhe where he started his own furniture business in 1938.

== Career ==
In 1950, Mann opened a larger store that turned out to be the key to his success. During the sixties, chain stores sprouted up across Germany. The brand Mann Mobilia for discount quality furniture was established in 1970.

Mann had started another business in 1958, the Wertkauf food store chains. Mann bought two-thirds of FedMart, a highly successful chain of department stores in the United States, in 1975. He subsequently fired founder Sol Price from FedMart and the store chain failed within seven years. In 1989, Hugo Mann retired and handed the Wertkauf business over to his son Johannes. Wertkauf was sold to Walmart in 1997. The Austrian Lutz group bought Mann Mobilia in 2005.
