= Hiraya Water Corporation =

Water and wastewater services provider

- Formerly: Primewater Infrastructure Corporation (2006–2026)
- Type: Privately-held / Public utility
- Founded: August 10, 2006; 20 years ago
- Headquarters: 900 Romualdez Street, Paco, Manila, Metro Manila, Philippines
- Number of locations: Around 100 partnered water districts (2021)
- Services: Water infrastructure development, delivery sewerage and sanitation
- Owner: Villar Group (2006–2025); Crystal Bridges Holding (2025–present)
- Website: primewatercorp.com

Hiraya Water Corporation, formerly Primewater Infrastructure Corporation (dba as PrimeWater), is a water and wastewater services provider in the Philippines. It is previously a subsidiary of Prime Asset Ventures, Inc. under Villar business and political family which includes former senators Manny and Cynthia Villar before being sold to tycoon Lucio Co.

== History ==
=== As Primewater ===
Final logo of Primewater

The company began as PrimeWater, established on August 10, 2006. In five years, it has expanded its reach to cover areas across the Philippines in Luzon, Visayas, and Mindanao.

Water in the Philippines are supplied by water districts which are government-owned which often deals with funding issues. This led to them entering into public private partnerships to develop their water supply capabilities. Among these private firms is PrimeWater, which continued to expand in the 2010s by entering joint venture agreements (JVAs) with state-owned water districts.

By 2021, PrimeWater controls 100 water districts out of the more than 500 districts in the Philippines according to the Local Water Utilities Administration (LWUA).

In 2023, the Commission on Audit noted lapses on PrimeWater's JVAs with Dasmariñas, Silang, Tagaytay, Trece Martires, and Malaybalay water districts.

In May 2025, the LWUA began investigating PrimeWater over its alleged poor services and high cost leading to an order by President Bongbong Marcos. The investigation also examined alleged conflicts of interest involving Mark Villar, who was a secretary of the Department of Public Works and Highways when PrimeWater's JVAs were significantly expanded in 2019 while LWUA was attached to the department.

=== Sale to Lucio Co, rebrand as Hiraya Water Corporation ===
In December 2025, the Villar group announced that that Crystal Bridges Holding Corporation of Lucio Co will acquire full ownership of PrimeWater.

On June 10, 2026, the Securities and Exchange Commission approved the renaming of PrimeWater to Hiraya Water Corporation. Following the rebranding, the company transferred its corporate headquarters from Vista Campus in Ususan, Taguig, to Romualdez Street in Paco, Manila, sharing with Puregold, which is also owned by Lucio Co.

== Service areas ==
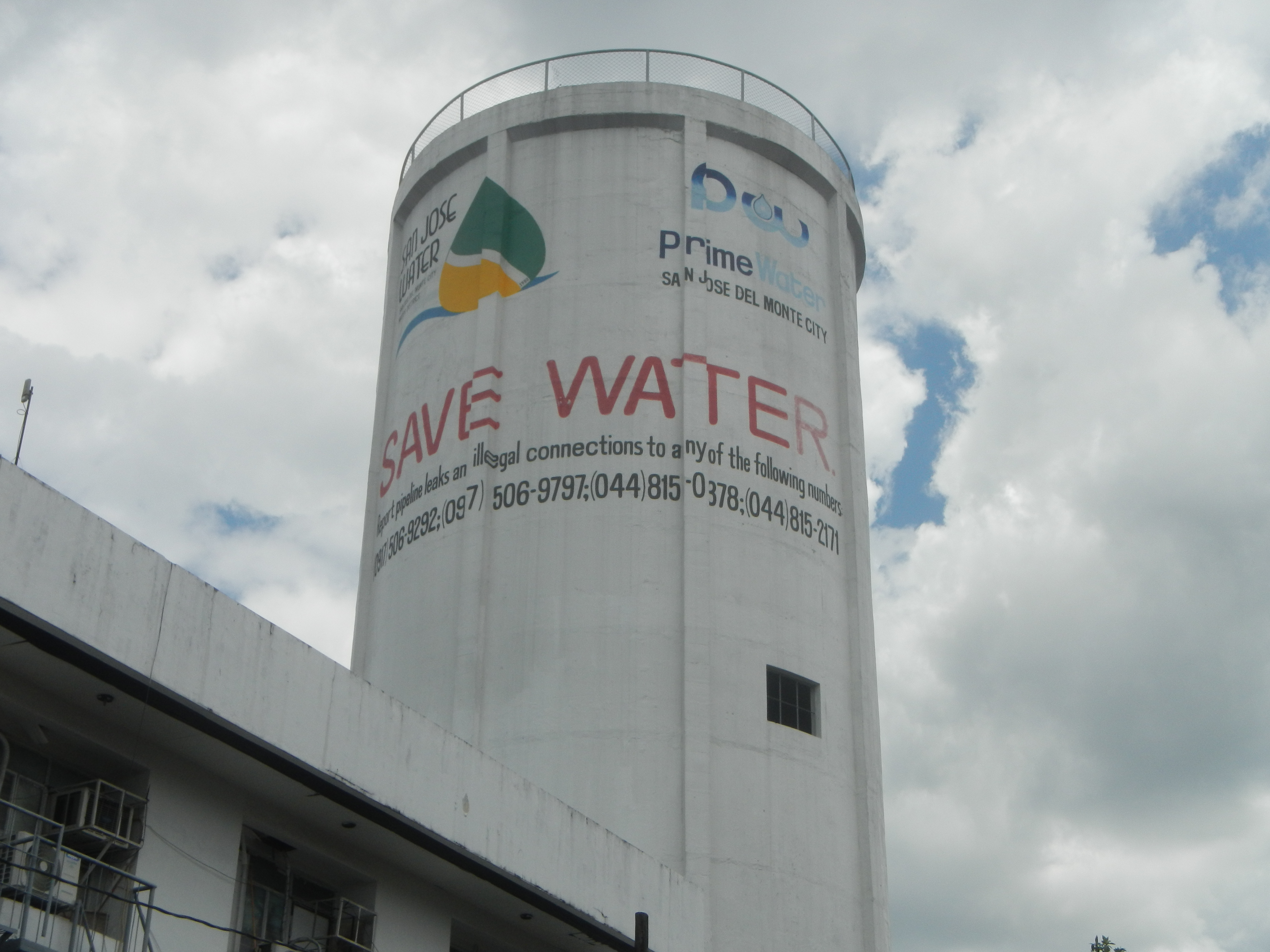
A water tower in San Jose del Monte, Bulacan, bearing the logos of the city's joint water service providers, San Jose del Monte Water District and PrimeWater

By 2021, Hiraya, then known as PrimeWater, entered into joint venture of operations with 100 water districts in the Philippines according to the LWUA. Water districts by law cannot be sold to private corporations, hence Hiraya develops these areas under a joint venture agreement.

=== Pre-termination of joint venture agreements ===
In March 2025, the Quezon Metropolitan Water District (QMWD) initiated the termination of its joint venture agreement with PrimeWater. In its official resolution, QMWD explicitly stated that PrimeWater "committed breaches which caused dissatisfaction of the concessionaires on the services of [PrimeWater]."

The following month, the San Jose del Monte Water Board also moved to pre-terminate their joint venture agreements with PrimeWater, citing mounting consumer complaints, poor service quality and risks to public health. In August, the provincial government of Bulacan formally moved to terminate all joint venture agreements with PrimeWater in the province.

Other local government units and water districts also moved to pre-terminate their JVAs with PrimeWater, including:

- City of Dasmariñas, Cavite
- Leyte Metropolitan Water District (serving Palo, Tanauan, Tolosa, Dagami, Pastrana, Santa Fe, Babatngon, and the City of Tacloban)
- Mabalacat, Pampanga
- Malaybalay, Bukidnon
- San Fernando, Pampanga
- San Pedro, Laguna
- Santa Cruz, Laguna
- Subic, Zambales

In La Union, the Metro San Fernando Water District (MSFWD) which supplies water to the city of San Fernando, and the towns of Bauang, Bacnotan, San Juan, and San Gabriel terminated its JVA with PrimeWater on 8 May 2025. However, PrimeWater petitioned the San Fernando Regional Trial Court for a protection order, which was granted in June 2025, allowing the company to continue overseeing the water supply in the MSFWD service area.
