= Price Club =

American warehouse club chain

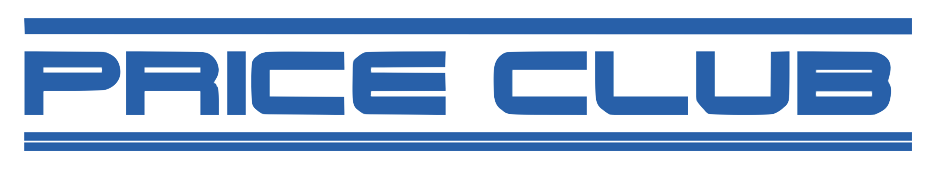
- Final logo
- Type: Private
- Industry: Warehouse club; Cash and carry
- Founded: July 12, 1976; 50 years ago
- Founder: Sol Price
- Defunct: 1997; 29 years ago
- Fate: Merged with Costco
- Successors: Costco; PriceSmart; S&R Membership Shopping
- Headquarters: San Diego, California, United States
- Number of locations: 94 warehouses (1993)
- Area served: United States, Canada, Mexico

Price Club was an American warehouse club chain. Founded in 1976, it merged with its competitor, Costco Wholesale, in 1993. The original Price Club warehouse in San Diego, California, is now Costco location number 401.

== History ==
Price Club was founded by Sol Price in 1975 after he was forced out of FedMart, another retail chain he had founded. Price and several friends invested $2.5 million to establish Price Club. The first Price Club location opened on July 12, 1976, in San Diego, at the former site of a manufacturing building previously owned by Howard Hughes.

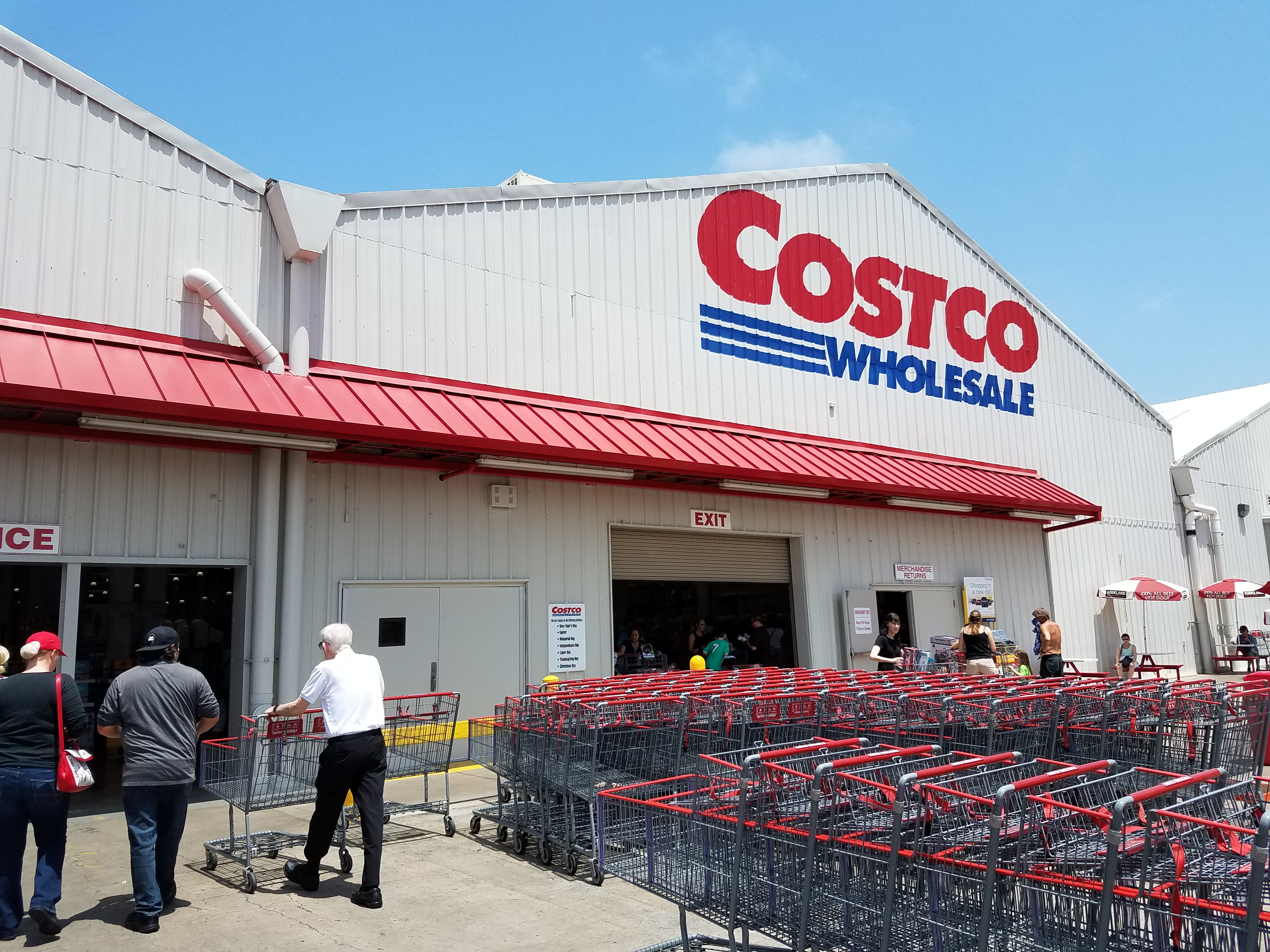
The original Price Club location is now a Costco

After leaving FedMart, Price noticed that small businesses in San Diego either ordered directly from four or five large wholesalers or they bought locally from relatively small cash-and-carry wholesalers. Therefore, Price Club was originally positioned as a much larger, volume-oriented version of the cash-and-carry wholesale format, meaning that prospective members were required to present resale certificates or professional licenses. Price Club membership was initially only available to business customers, but was later expanded to other groups, such as employees of local businesses, nonprofits, and governments. The company charged shoppers a $25 annual membership fee to purchase bulk products at discount prices in a no-frills warehouse setting. Price Club's high sales volume enabled it to pay its employees higher wages and offer greater benefits than typical retailers. The company eventually expanded to 94 locations throughout the United States, Canada, and Mexico (in joint venture with Controladora Comercial Mexicana). In 1992, Price Club generated $6.6 billion in revenue and $134.1 million in profit.

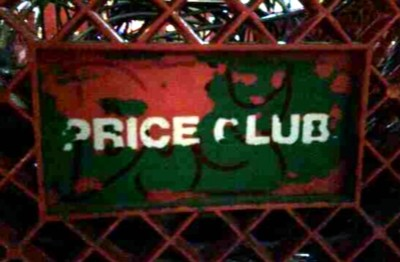
A former Price Club shopping cart

In 1993, Price Club merged with its rival Costco; the combined company was known as PriceCostco. Price Club and Costco initially continued to operate as separate chains, with members of either chain being able to shop at both stores. However, by the following year, Price Enterprises was spun off from the combined company and later established PriceSmart in Central America, South America, and the Caribbean. In 1997, PriceCostco became Costco Wholesale Corporation and all remaining Price Clubs were rebranded as Costco.
