= Globe Discount City =

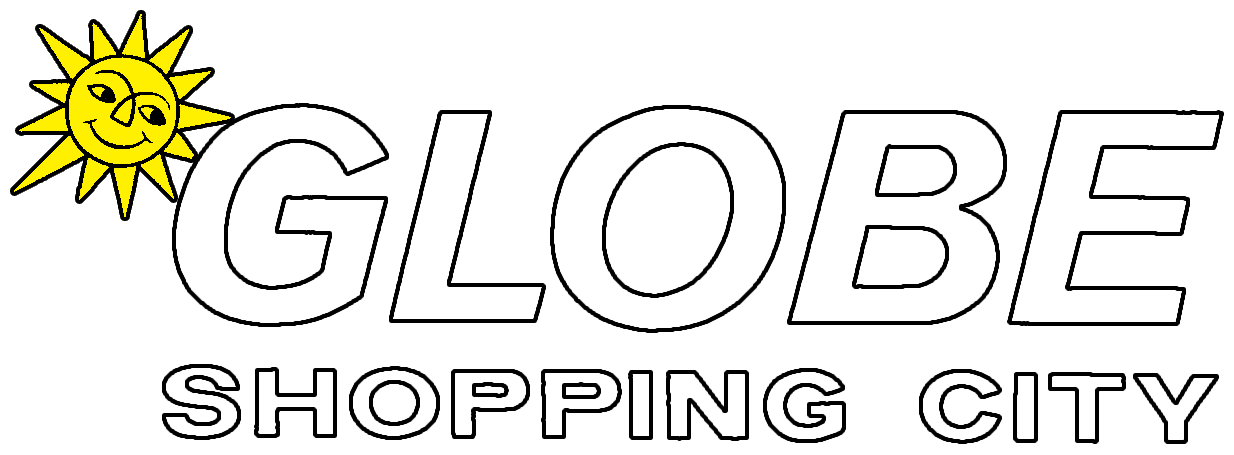
- One of three Globe Logos
- Industry: Retail
- Founded: 1960
- Defunct: December 31, 1999
- Fate: Liquidation
- Headquarters: Chicago, Illinois, U.S. and Houston, Texas, U.S.,
- Products: Clothing, footwear, bedding, furniture, jewelry, beauty products, electronics, housewares, groceries, auto service, pets
- Parent: Walgreens (owned from 1962 and discontinued in 1978)

Globe Discount City and Globe Shopping City was a chain of discount department stores that operated beginning in 1960. Globe stores were located in the Southwest United States and were operated as a "big-box store" retail arm of Walgreens for much of the chain's operational lifecycle. Massive financial losses led to the dispersal of the entire chain through a combination of liquidation sales and transferral of individual store locations in 1978. An independently-run Globe Discount City Store continued until its closure in 1999.

== History ==
The first Globe Discount City opened in Houston in November 1960 by United Mercantile Inc. United had formed earlier in 1960 to operate the existing seven-store chain of Danburg's Department Stores which had existed since the 1930s and the forthcoming big-box Globe retail locations – the first three of which were each built with over 100,000 square feet of space. All but one of the Danburg locations were in the Houston, Texas market as were the first four Globe Discount City locations. Unlike the smaller Danburg department stores, the Globe City concept featured a full grocery store, a Sun Cafeteria utilizing the store's sun logo, and an expanded variety of more than 80 departments including live pets, firearms, and a Globe Auto Center housed in an outparcel building.

With three Globe stores open in 1962, Walgreens acquired the United Mercantile portfolio in March 1962. Walgreens had seen F.W. Woolworth announce its new big-box retail concept of Woolco in 1961, S.S. Kresge opening its first Kmart in January 1962, and many others getting into large scale discount stores including the first Walmart store later in 1962 and W.T. Grant would create big-box Grant City stores. Walgreens would use Globe as its big-box brand while later creating a Walgreens Superstore line for its mid-sized pharmacy-centric stores while continuing its existing, smaller Walgreens stores.

Walgreens would extend the Globe big-box locations to its peak of 31 stores primarily in Texas and Arizona with three locations in Louisiana and two locations each in Tennessee and New Mexico. Some locations were branded as Globe Discount City with others labeled as Globe Shopping City. The stores’ positioning statement remained consistent as, “Everything under the sun priced lower.” To retain Globe's “multi-line customer appeal,” Walgreens leased back certain departments of the store including the food market, fine jewelry (to Zales), the auto center (to Uniroyal, and the shoe department to third party vendors. Annual Walgreens shareholders reports touted Globe's “per square foot” sales in the early 1970s that were over-trending and the chain's usage of computers to track inventory, sales, and other key performance indicators. The 1973 shareholder report provided a note of warning that the big-box competition was getting “intense” and the chain would not be extending past its Southwest locations.

=== Downturn and Closure ===
United Mercantile / Walgreens closed all of the Danburg locations in 1971/2 as its aging mid-sized department stores were under competition from shopping mall anchors and newer big-box stores. By 1976, Globe stores were underperforming and around 40% of sales were going to the leased areas of the stores. Walgreens ended the Globe-branded check cashing card and internal credit system in favor of bank credit cards to help efficiency. The final three stores were opened in San Antonio early in 1977 to double the number of stores from three to six in the city. But later that same year, Walgreens reported lower earnings partly due to the financial downturn of its Globe store unit. Losses were at $10 million in 1977 when Walgreens decided to exit the big-box space in 1978 closing or transferring all of its Globe Discount City locations by July 1978. Transactions were made to convert 14 locations to Kmarts and 8 locations became FedMart stores. A number of locations which weren't transferred hosted auction sales to dispense with fixtures and any remaining inventory. However, one location in McAllen remained as an independently-run Globe Discount City Store that operated for 20 more years closing at the end of 1999. Hilco/Great American Group of Chicago liquidated the inventory of the last Globe Discount location during November of December of 1999.
