= S&R Membership Shopping =

Philippine chain of warehouse clubs

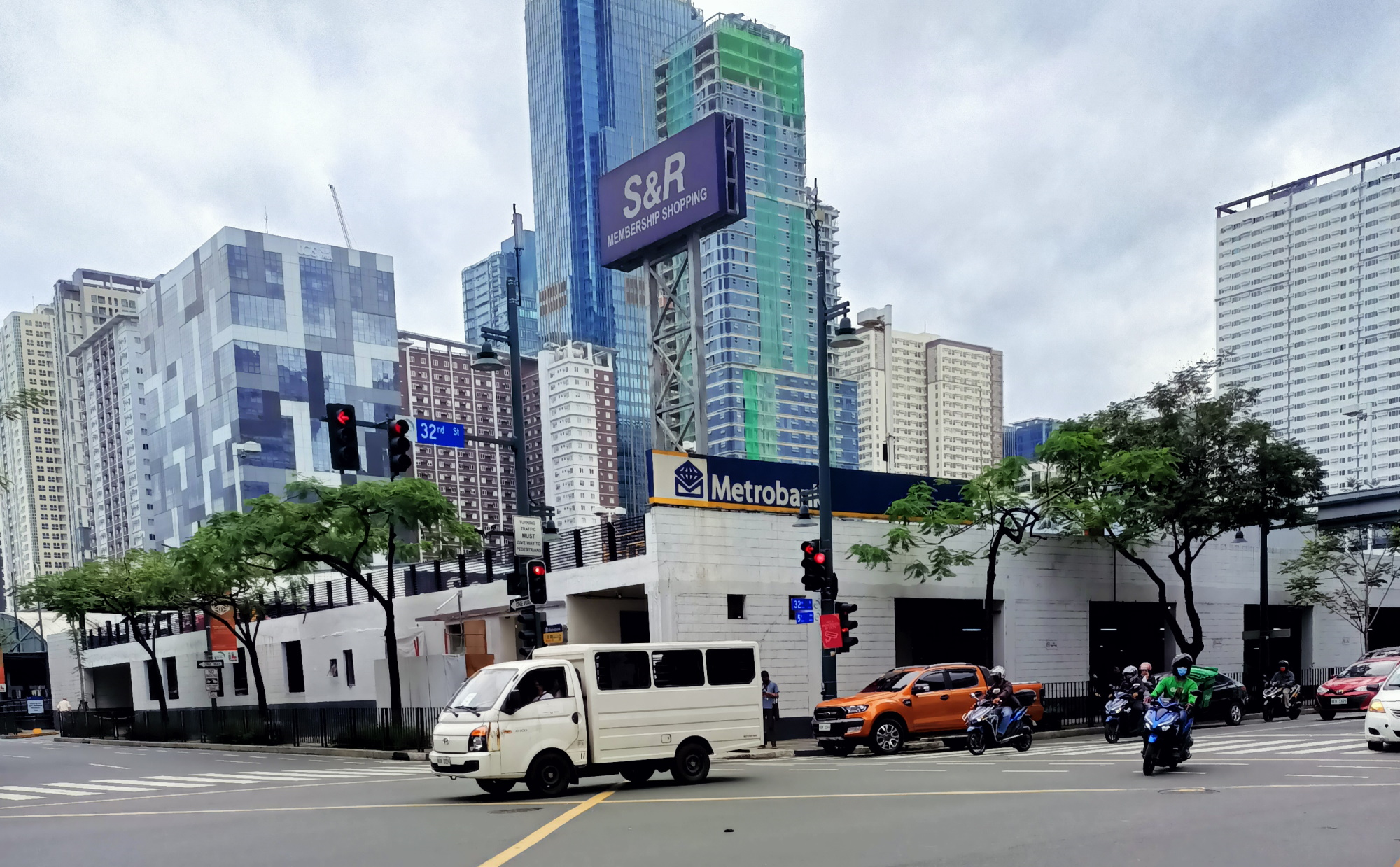
- S&R branch at Bonifacio Global City
- Product type: Membership-only retail warehouse club chain
- Current owner: Puregold Price Club Inc.
- Country: Philippines
- Introduced: 2001; 25 years ago
- Markets: Philippines
- Previous owners: PSMT Philippines, Inc.
- Website: snrshopping.com

S&R Membership Shopping is a membership-only retail warehouse club chain in the Philippines.

== History ==
S&R Membership Shopping was established in 2001 as S&R PriceSmart, a franchise of the American membership-only warehouse club chain PriceSmart. The name "S&R" stands for American businessmen Sol and Robert Price, founders of Price Club and PriceSmart. PriceSmart was the first major foreign retailer to enter the Philippine market since the passage of the Retail Trade Act of 2000, which liberalized the retail sector. In November 2001, PriceSmart opened its first branch on a 5,000 m^{2} (0.50 ha) property in Bonifacio Global City, then known as The Fort.

In 2005, PriceSmart sold its share in the joint venture and was acquired by Lucio Co and his family in 2006, and the retail chain was renamed as S&R Membership Shopping. The Co's operations over S&R is taken care of by Kareila Management, Inc. which also operates the Puregold Price Club.

The chain opened three more branches in Metro Manila before opening its first branch outside of Metro Manila and Luzon in Mandaue, Cebu in 2010.

In 2012, Puregold and Kareila underwent a merger. The former bought all the stakes of Kareila Management over S&R.

In 2014, S&R opened its first standalone membership-free S&R New York Style Pizza restaurant in Fairview Terraces in Quezon City.

== Business model ==
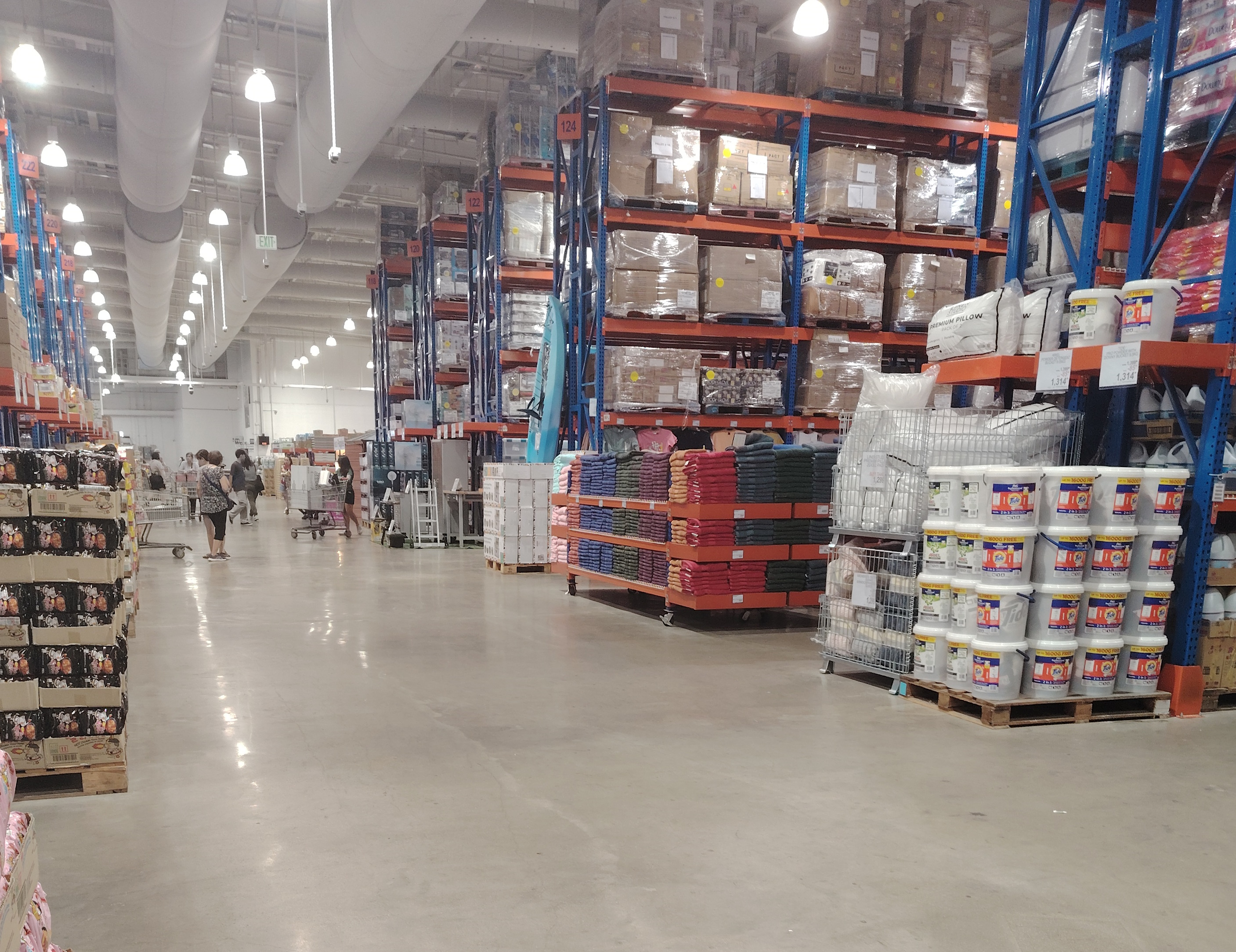
Interior of an S&R Membership Shopping outlet in Quezon City.

S&R Membership Shopping adopts the US warehouse club model, exclusively for members. It targets the upper middle class and offers a tire center at its locations. Additionally, S&R features a membership-free restaurant chain, known for its New York-style pizza. S&R also has partnerships with UnionBank, offering a co-branded S&R membership card and credit card with additional S&R benefits, and Unioil, which offers discounted gasoline and diesel prices for members at participating Unioil gas stations.

== Branches ==
As of September 2026, S&R operates 34 warehouse club branches, with 11 in Metro Manila, 17 in the rest of Luzon, three in Visayas, and three in Mindanao.

== See also ==
- Landers Superstore
