= Shelf-ready packaging =

Form of product packaging

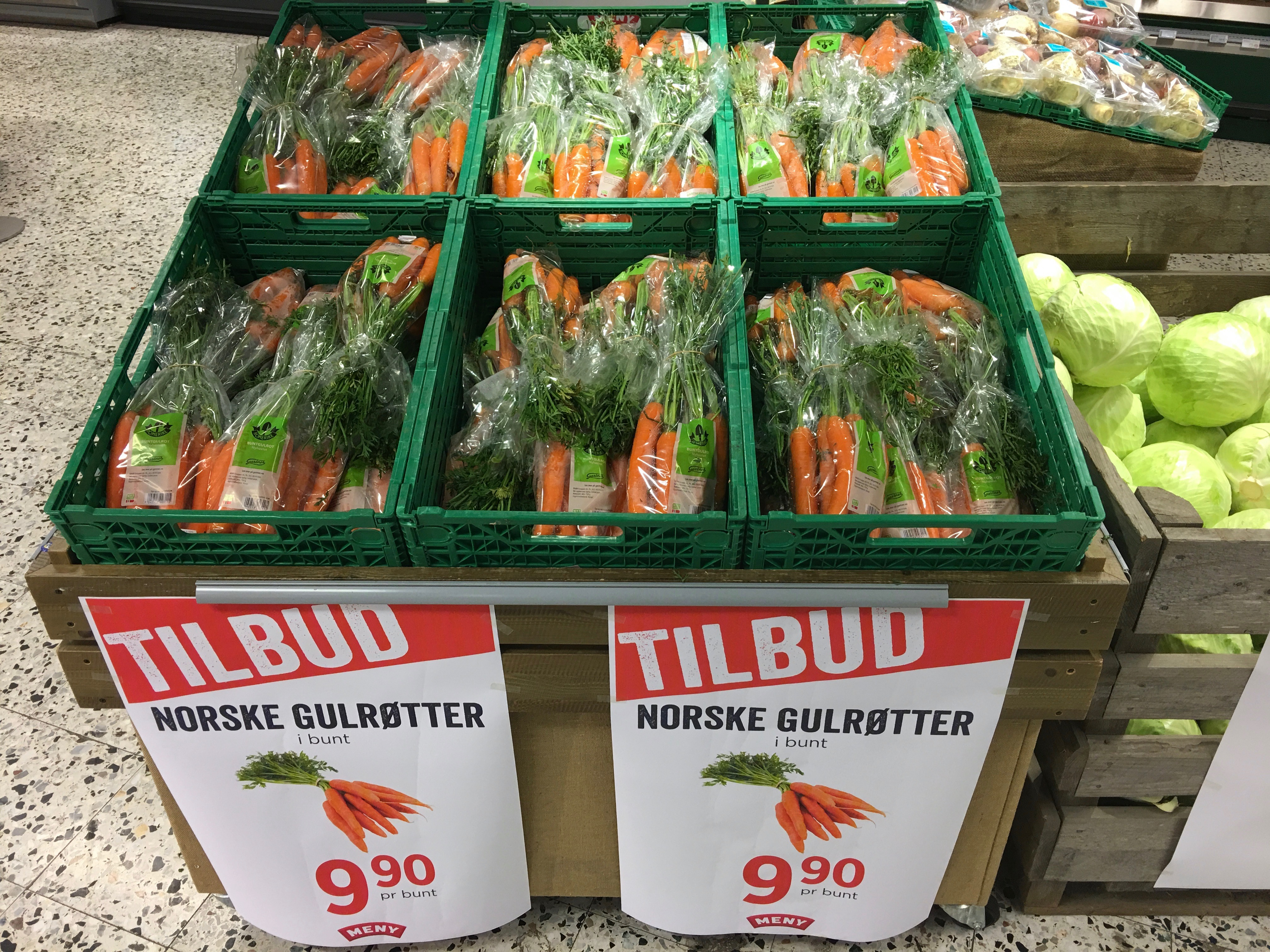
Carrots on display in returnable plastic bins

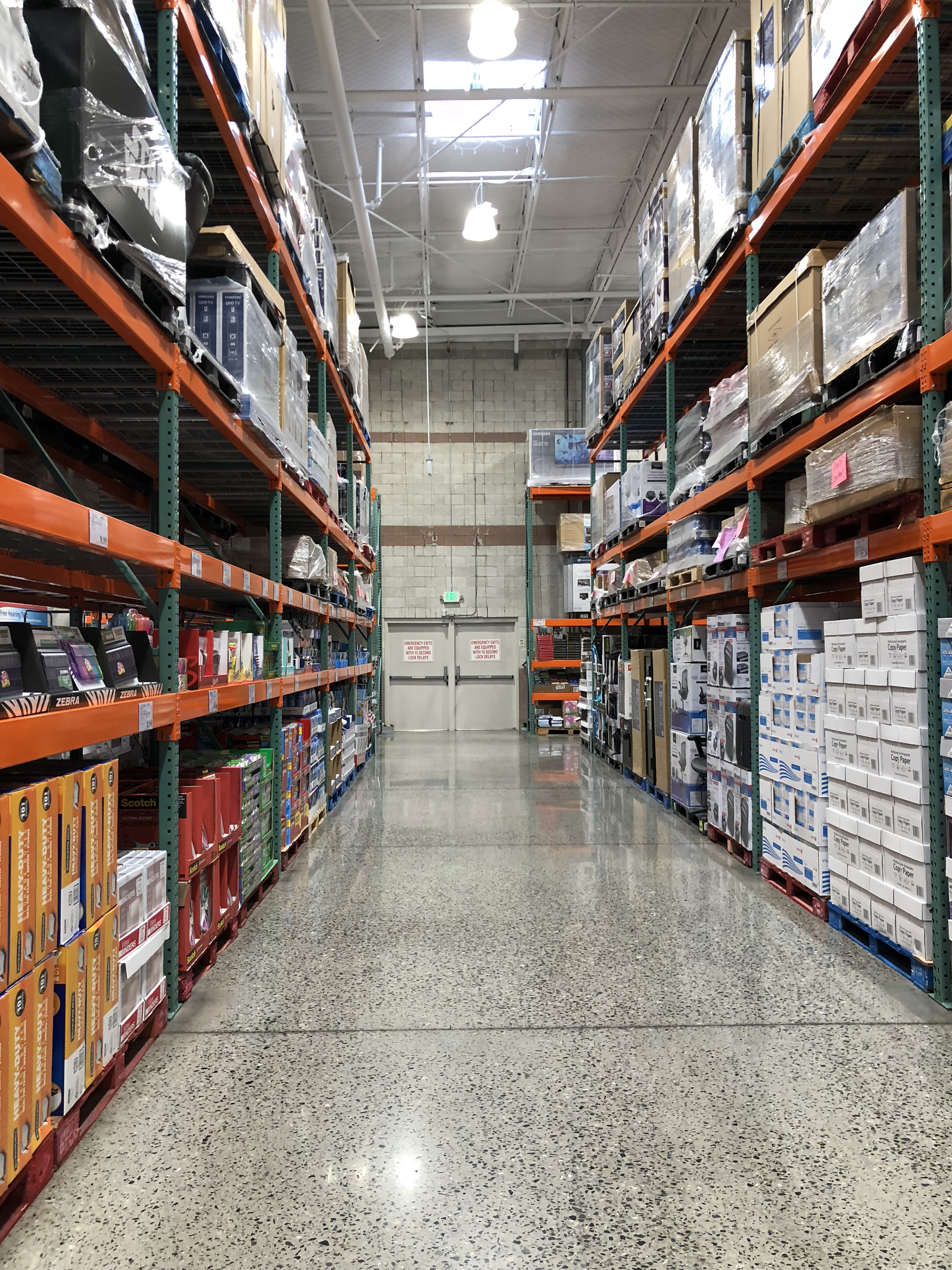
Warehouse club store; consumers pick most items directly from pallets, not shelves

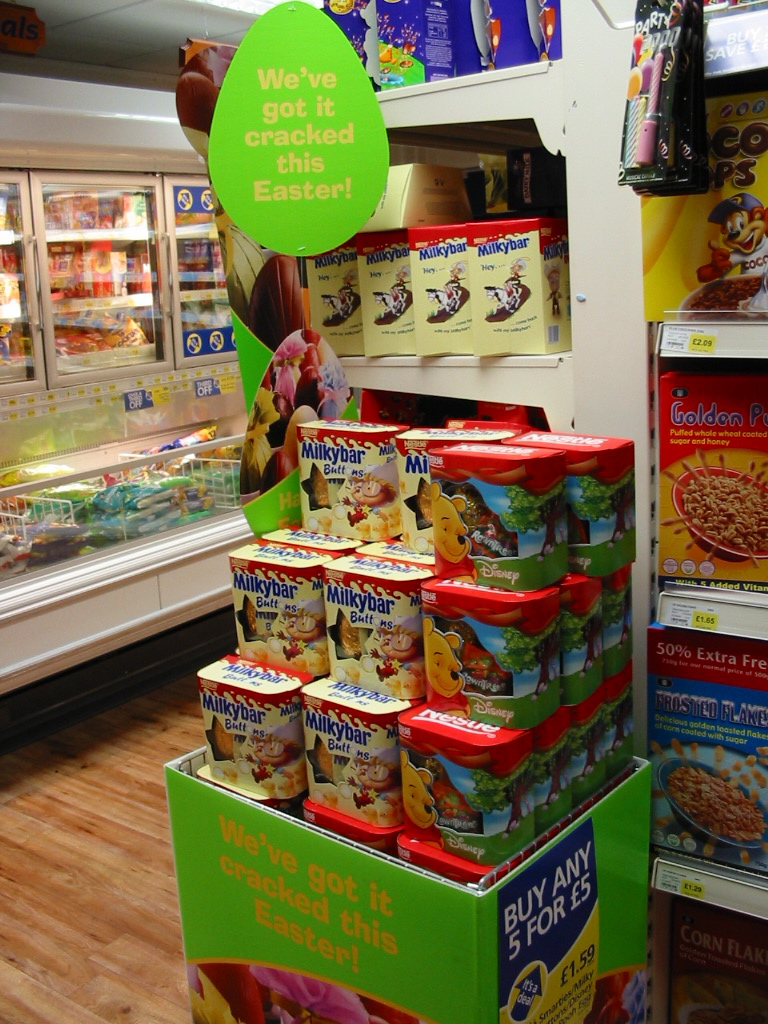
Display stand at the end of aisle, delivered to the store ready-to-place

Shelf-ready packaging (SRP) and retail-ready packaging (RRP) (also prêt-à-vendre (PAV)) refers to the packaging of a product so that it is delivered to a retailer in packaging which is optimized for efficient stocking and sale.

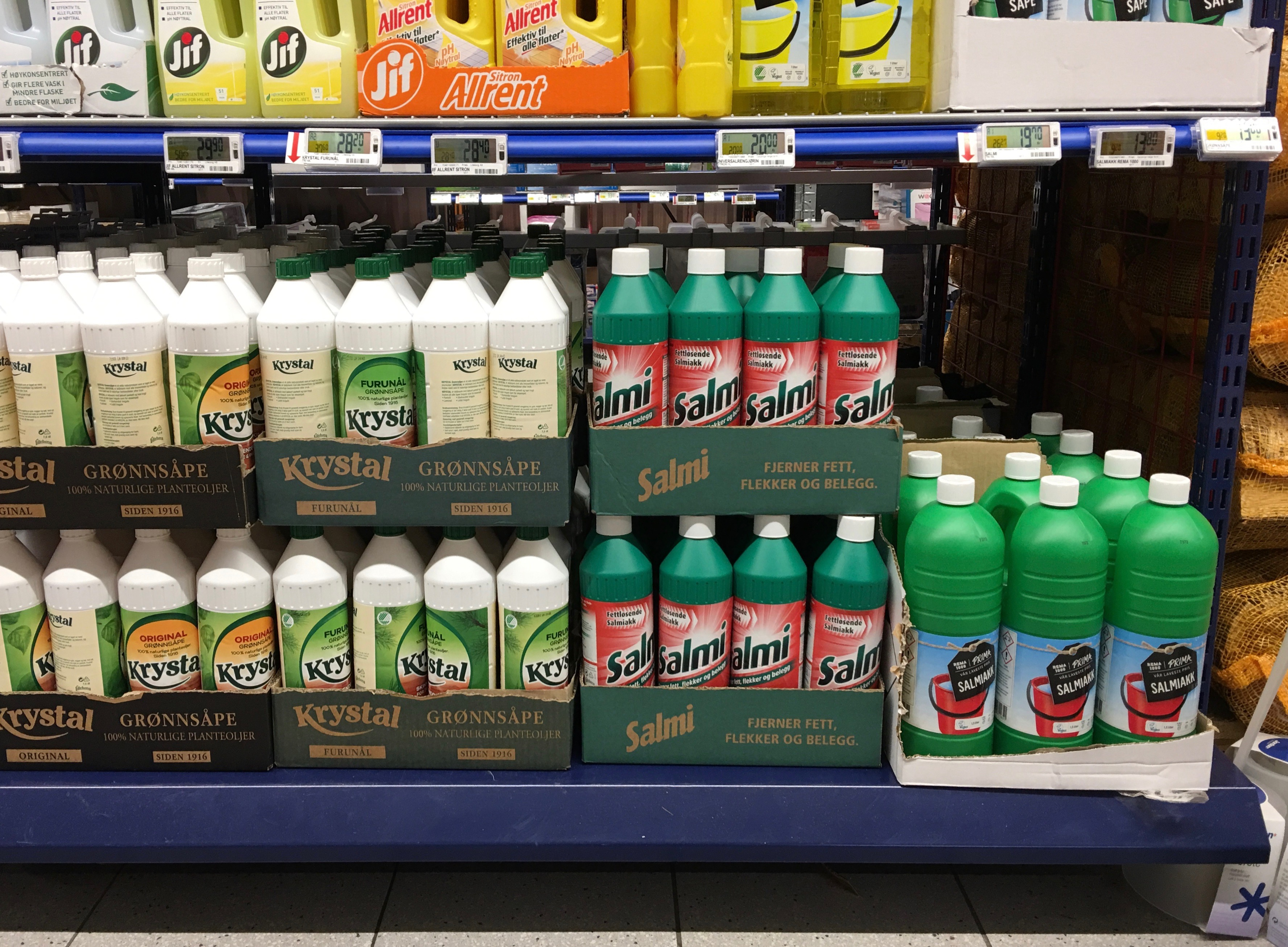
Cleaning product placed on shelf in SRP trays; upper parts of boxes removed

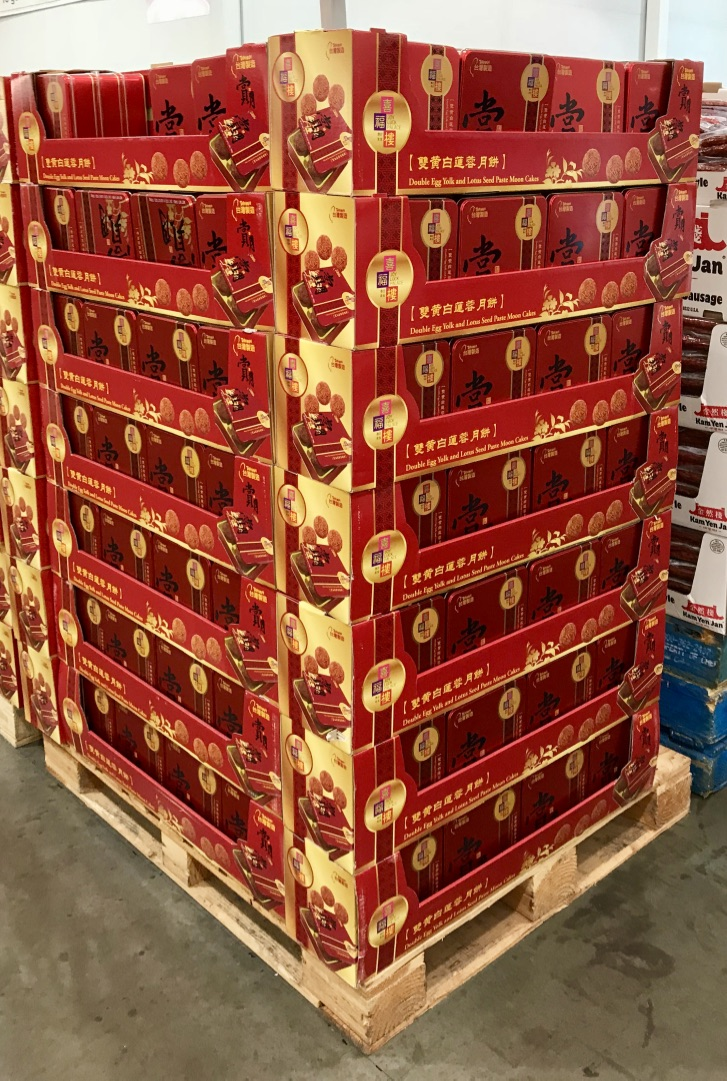
Cans of cookies in corrugated display boxes on pallet at warehouse club store

== Background ==
Retailers, particularly large big-box stores, superstores and warehouse clubs, sell large quantities of fast-moving consumer goods. These retailers often want to have items shipped from their distribution centers to the stores in unit loads and bulk boxes: these can be stocked without handling of the merchandise. The purpose of corrugated shipping containers is to put case goods directly onto shelves and stocking locations without individually handling the unit packs or primary packages. Many large retailers ask for items to remain on pallets rather than use shelves. Retailers often require products to come in retail-ready packaging to reduce stocking costs by saving labor expenses.

Ready-to-go display stands and end caps are put in the retail sales location by forklift trucks without assembly or manual handling of unit packs.

== Requirements ==
Retailers commonly specify all aspects of incoming logistics and packaging to their suppliers. This includes pallet size, bar code format and placement, RFID tags, strength of corrugated shipping containers etc. Boxes must be easy to open and prepare for stocking. Several designs are available. Box perforations, tear tape, etc. must be intuitive and easy. Box cutters are often discouraged. Frequently, requirements for reusable packaging and sustainable packaging are also provided.

The principles of shelf-ready packaging are almost universal. Not all retailers have identical requirements. For example, Costcos "Structural Packaging Specifications", Target's "Shelf Ready and Transit Packaging Standards, Hardgoods", and Walmart's "RRP and PDQ Display Standard Style Guide" are similar but not identical.

Regional coordination in Europe has produced an agreement on common functional requirements for the design of SRP. The Efficient Consumer Response (ECR), Europe Working Group, has published "Shelf Ready Packaging" to help standardize programs.

Manufacturers and packagers need to be aware of the diverse requirements of retailers as they package and ship products. Sometimes consultants and contract packagers with experience in shelf-ready-packaging are useful.

== Types ==
Due to the fact that there are many different products which need to be packed in a SRP, products can be delivered by a variety of solutions.

=== Shelf tray ===
SRP solutions which can be placed in the shelf are predominantly made of corrugated cardboard. In general, these consist of a tray (secondary packaging) and a cover (a lid which protects the product). The cover can be easily separated from the tray by a perforation. Sometimes the cover of a tray is a transparent film which protects the products from mechanical and climatic influences.

=== Re-usable plastic tray ===
In addition to SRP made of corrugated cardboard, packaging can also be made of reusable materials such as plastic. Such plastic containers can be reused directly in the store. If reuse is not possible, the containers can be returned to the producer.

=== Merchandising unit ===
Merchandising units represent another type of SRP solutions. They are used for secondary placement. Normally, promotional goods or fast-moving products are presented in a merchandising unit. An enormous number of products can be placed in a merchandising unit. Therefore, the merchandising unit serves as SRP. Secondary placements can trigger impulse purchases. Often, roll-up palettes, called dollies, are used as a base for merchandising units. Rolling pallets facilitate the handling of merchandising units and increase flexibility.

== Importance of shelf-ready packaging ==
Shelf-ready packaging continues to be growing in many market segments, including over-the-counter pharmaceuticals. SRP helps retail stores to achieve cost savings in labor and in packaging materials. It also makes packaged products easier to spot for customers, resulting in better sales. Significant efforts and investments are usually made in improving aisle efficiency for consumers, ensuring consistent demand for suitable retail-ready products from physical outlets.

== See also ==
- Packaging and labeling
- Merchandising
- Fast-moving consumer goods
- Hypermarket
- Warehouse club
- Big-box store
