= Landers Superstore =

Philippine chain of warehouse clubs

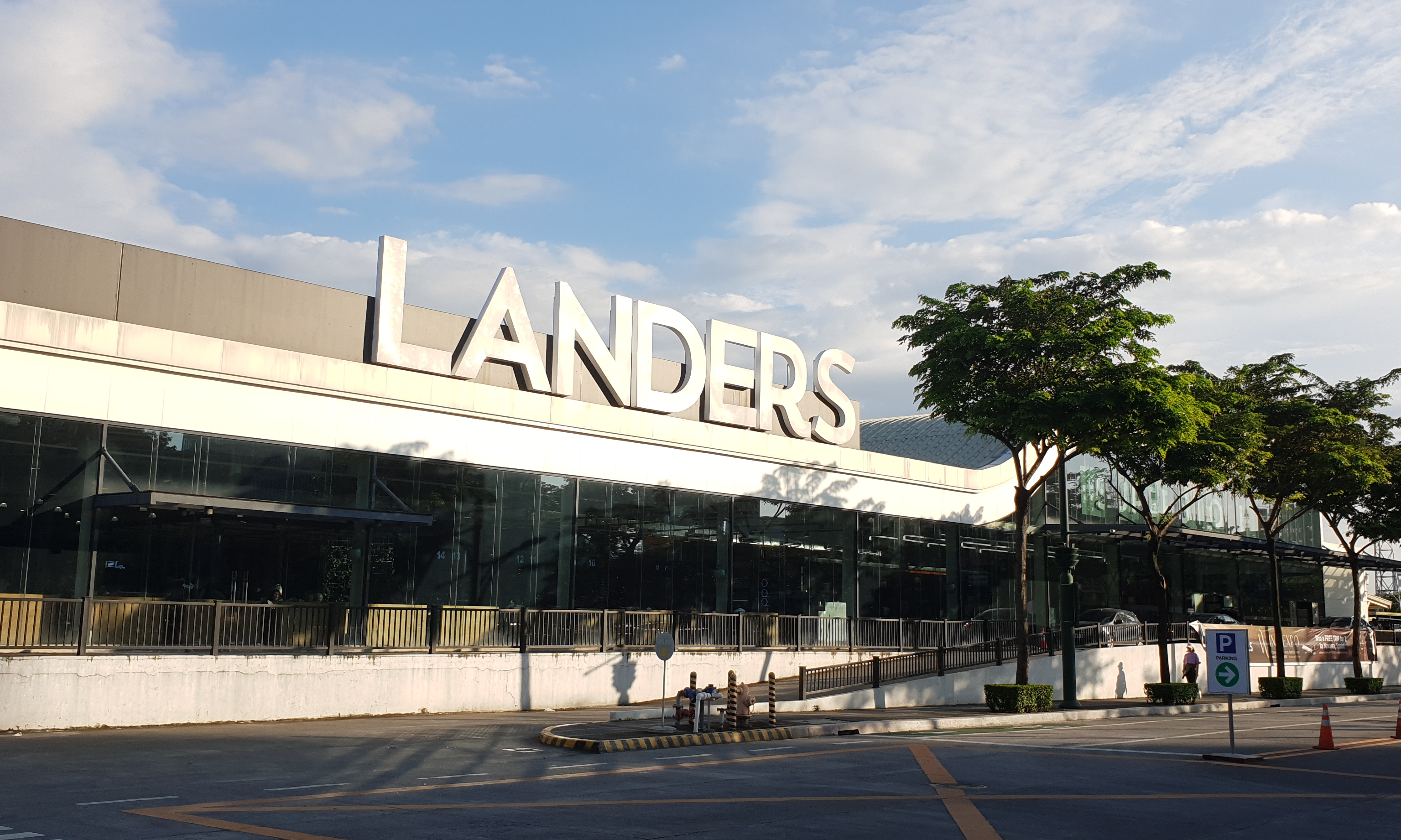
- Landers Arcovia City branch in Arcovia City, Pasig
- Product type: Membership-only retail warehouse club chain
- Current owner: Southeast Asia Retail Inc.
- Country: Philippines
- Introduced: June 22, 2016; 10 years ago in Quezon City
- Markets: Philippines
- Website: Official website

Landers Superstore (also known as Landers) is a Philippine chain of membership-only retail warehouse clubs owned and operated by Southeast Asia Retail Inc.

== History ==
Landers Superstore opened its first branch along Epifanio delos Santos Avenue in Barangay Balintawak, Quezon City on June 22, 2016. Megawide Construction Corporation was the main contractor for the construction of some of its Metro Manila branches.

Landers expanded outside Metro Manila when it opened a branch in Cebu City on May 9, 2017.

A Landers branch in Arcovia City, Pasig was temporarily closed in March 2024 after a fire. The branch reopened on November 20, 2024.

A Landers branch in Fairview, Quezon City was temporarily closed on January 28, 2026 after a fire.

== Business Model and Partnerships ==
Landers Superstore operates as a membership-only warehouse club. A typical Landers branch contains a pharmacy, barbershop, restaurant, coffee shop and bakery. Some branches had Caltex stations but were replaced by Shell in October 2026.

Landers Superstore maintains partnerships with Chinabank and Maya to offer co-branded membership and credit cards.

== Branches ==
As of December 2025, Landers operates in 16 branches with its largest branch, located inside The Upper East in Bacolod, occupying a 2.5-hectare (6.2-acre) lot.

== See also ==
- S&R Membership Shopping
