= Wertkauf =

German retail group

Wertkauf Verwaltungsgesellschaft mbH
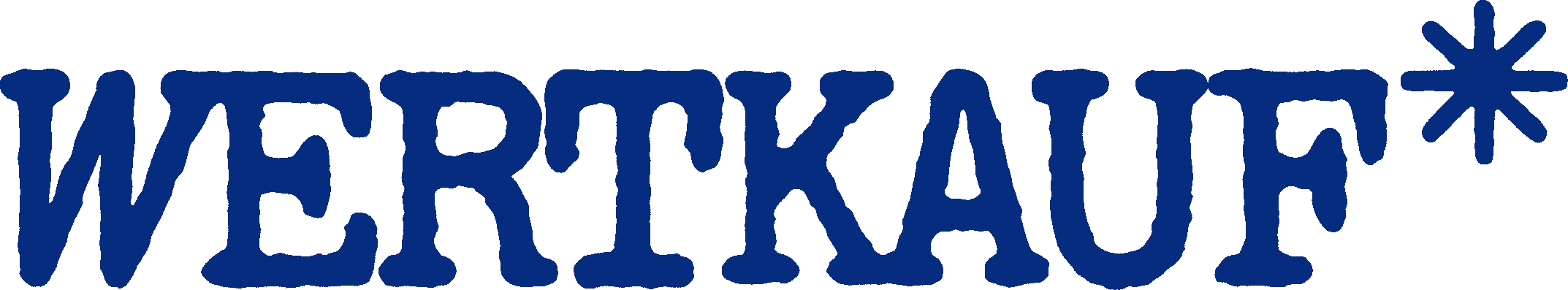
- Company type: GmbH
- Founded: 1958
- Defunct: 1997
- Fate: Sold to Walmart
- Headquarters: Karlsruhe
- Key people: Hugo Mann (Until 1989); Johannes Mann (From 1989)
- Revenue: €1.5 billion
- Number of employees: about 6,000

Wertkauf Verwaltungsgesellschaft mbH was a German retail group that had 21 stores until a takeover by the US supermarket chain Walmart in 1997. The group's head office was based in Karlsruhe.

== History ==
The first branch opened in 1958 in Karlsruhe. In 1966, a shopping center with 3,500 m^{2} was opened in Freiburg. The new Karlsruhe shopping center, built c. 1965, was heavily damaged on the 26 of August 1969 due to a major fire caused by a propane gas cylinder explosion. It was rebuilt in the same place and slightly expanded.

Eight years later, the second sales office in Freiburg was opened, covering an area of 6,000 m^{2}. In 1968, the company built the largest European self-service department store in the Euro-Industriepark in Munich with an area of 13,500 m^{2}. High shelves were used for storage, and the goods were handled by forklift.

The chain had generated annual sales of up to 1.5 billion euros with approximately 6,000 employees.

The owners were Hugo Mann and his wife Rosmarie, née Porst. She had also founded the furniture chain Mann Mobilia.

In 1997, Wertkauf was sold to the American retail chain Walmart. After the company experienced certain difficulties getting into the German market, the entire German branch of Walmart was sold to the Metro Group in 2006.
