= PriceSmart =

American membership warehouse club

PriceSmart, Inc.

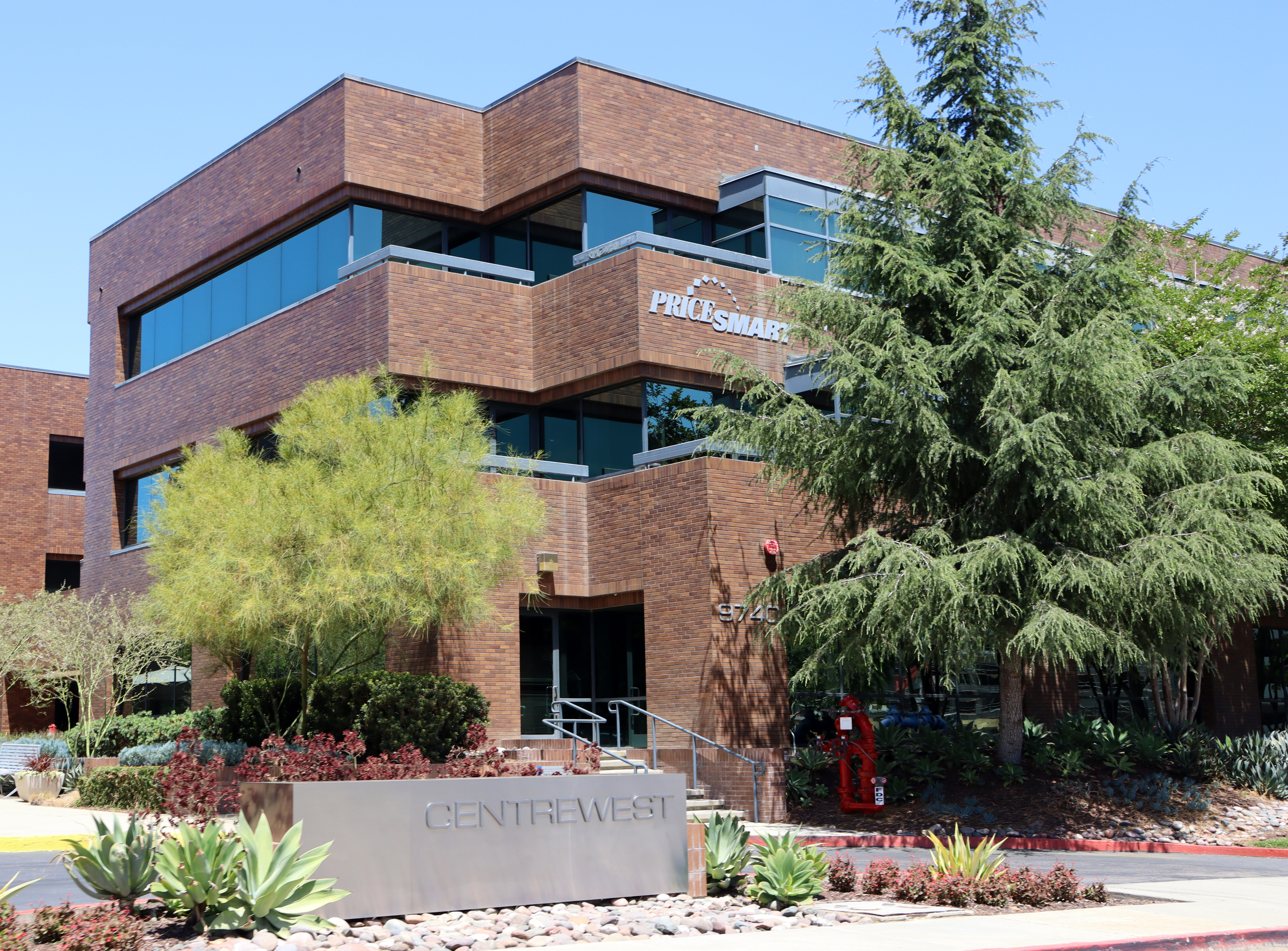
- PriceSmart headquarters in San Diego
- Type: Public
- Traded as: Nasdaq: PSMT; S&P 600 component; Russell 2000 component
- Predecessor: Price Club
- Founded: 1993; 33 years ago
- Founder: Sol Price
- Headquarters: San Diego, California, U.S.
- Revenue: ▲US$5.3 billion (2025)
- Net income: ▲US$148 million (2025)
- Number of employees: 7,903 (2017)
- Website: pricesmart.com

PriceSmart, Inc. is a United States based operator of membership warehouse clubs in Central America, the Caribbean, and South America. PriceSmart was founded by Sol and Robert Price, founders of Price Club; Robert Price is chairman of the board. As of September 2026, PriceSmart operates 58 warehouse clubs, with plans of 5 new locations.

== Warehouse clubs ==
The following table lists the warehouse clubs owned and operated currently by PriceSmart:

| Country | No. of stores |
|---|---|
| Aruba | 1 |
| Barbados | 1 |
| Colombia | 10 |
| Costa Rica | 10 |
| Dominican Republic | 6 |
| El Salvador | 4 |
| Guatemala | 7 |
| Honduras | 3 |
| Jamaica | 3 |
| Nicaragua | 2 |
| Panama | 7 |
| Trinidad and Tobago | 4 |
| U.S. Virgin Islands | 1 |

Planned

| Country | No. of stores |
|---|---|
| Chile | 3 |
| Costa Rica | 1 |
| Dominican Republic | 1 |
| Guatemala | 1 |
| Jamaica | 1 |

== Key dates ==
| Year | Events |
|---|---|
| 1976 | Price Club founded by Sol and Robert Price |
| 1993 | The Price Co. and Costco Wholesale Club merge, forming Price/Costco Inc (later renamed Costco Wholesale Corporation) |
| 1994 | Price Enterprises Inc spun off from Price/Costco Robert Price named chairman, president and CEO of Price Enterprises PriceSmart operates as a wholly owned subsidiary of Price Enterprises |
| 1995 | Licensees open two club stores (Micronesia and Guam) |
| 1996 | PriceSmart opens its first club store (Panama) Licensees open one club store (Indonesia) |
| 1997 | PriceSmart opens its second club store (Panama) Licensees open two club stores (China and Indonesia) Price Enterprises Inc separates itself from PriceSmart by spinning off all non-real estate assets to PriceSmart PriceSmart completes IPO and begins trading as PSMT on NASDAQ stock exchange Gilbert A. Partida appointed president and CEO |
| 1998 | Licensees open two club stores (China and Philippines) Licensee stores in Guam and Philippines close Licensee arrangement with operator of Indonesian club stores terminated |
| 1999 | PriceSmart opens seven club stores (Guatemala, Costa Rica, El Salvador, Honduras, Panama, two in Dominican Republic) Licensees open two club stores (China) |
| 2000 | PriceSmart opens eight club stores (Dominican Republic, El Salvador, Honduras, two in Costa Rica, Panama, Guatemala, Trinidad) Licensees open one club store (China) PSMT Philippines created as a joint venture with S&R Membership Shopping, with PriceSmart holding 60% ownership |
| 2001 | PriceSmart opens seven club stores (Aruba, USVI, Guatemala, Barbados, Trinidad, two in Philippines) Licensees open three club stores (China) |
| 2002 | PriceSmart opens three club stores (Guam, two in Philippines) PriceSmart starts wholesale phone card sales program Licensees open two club stores (China) PSMT Mexico created as joint venture with Grupo Gigante, with PriceSmart holding 50% ownership PSMT Mexico opens two club stores in Mexico |
| 2003 | PriceSmart opens two club stores (Jamaica, Nicaragua) PriceSmart closes four club stores (Dominican Republic, Guatemala, Guam, Philippines) PriceSmart terminates wholesale phone card sales program PSMT Mexico opens one club store Licensees open two club stores (China) Gilbert A. Partida resigns as president and CEO, Robert E. Price assumes role of interim president and CEO PriceSmart announces it will restate financial results for 2002 and 2003. |
| 2004 | PriceSmart opens one club store (Philippines) Licensees close two club stores (China) |
| 2005 | PriceSmart opens one club store (Costa Rica) PSMT Mexico closes its three stores in Mexico (Irapuato and Celaya stores replaced with Home Depot) Company sells its interest in PSMT Philippines to E-Class Corporation, one of PSMT Philippines' minority shareholders (all stores in Philippines became S&R) Licensee arrangement with operator of Chinese club stores terminated |
| 2006 | PriceSmart relocates San Pedro Sula, Honduras club store PriceSmart added to Russell 2000 stock index |
| 2007 | PriceSmart opens two club stores (Guatemala, Trinidad) PriceSmart sells its interest in PSMT Mexico to Grupo Gigante |
| 2009 | PriceSmart opens one club store (Costa Rica) Ranked #55 on Fortune Magazine's list of 100 fastest growing companies |
| 2011 | PriceSmart opens one club store (Colombia-Barranquilla) |
| 2012 | PriceSmart opens one club store (Colombia-Cali) |
| 2013 | PriceSmart opens two club stores (Colombia-Cali and Costa Rica) |
| 2014 | PriceSmart opens three club stores (Honduras, Colombia-Medellin, Colombia-Pereira) |
| 2015 | PriceSmart opens one club store (Colombia-Bogotá) |
| 2016 | PriceSmart opens one club store (Colombia-Chia) |
| 2018 | PriceSmart acquires Aeropost.com PriceSmart opens one club store (Dominican Republic) |
| 2019 | PriceSmart opens three club stores (Dominican Republic, Guatemala-San Cristobal, Panama-Metro Park) |
| 2020 | PriceSmart opens two club stores (Costa Rica-Liberia and Colombia-Bogota) |
| 2021 | PriceSmart opens two club stores (Colombia-Bucaramanga and Guatemala-Aranda) |
| 2022 | PriceSmart opens one club store (Jamaica-Portmore) Sherry Bahrambeygui removed from PriceSmart Pricemart sells Aeropost.com |
| 2023 | John Hildebrandt named COO PriceSmart opens three club stores (Colombia-El Poblado, El Salvador-San Miguel and Guatemala-Escuintla) |
| 2024 | PriceSmart opens one club store (El Salvador-Santa Ana) |
| 2025 | PriceSmart opens two club stores (Costa Rica, Guatemala-Quetzaltenango) |
| 2026 | PriceSmart opens one club store in Jamaica (Montego Bay) (As of 30 September 2026) |

== Worker organization ==
The Oilfields Workers' Trade Union (OWTU) has advocated for seating for cashiers at PriceSmart locations in Trinidad and Tobago. In December, 2025, unionized PriceSmart workers in Port of Spain protested for the right to sit. OWTU has been advocating for seating for cashiers for 15 years.
