= Puregold =

Supermarket in the Philippines

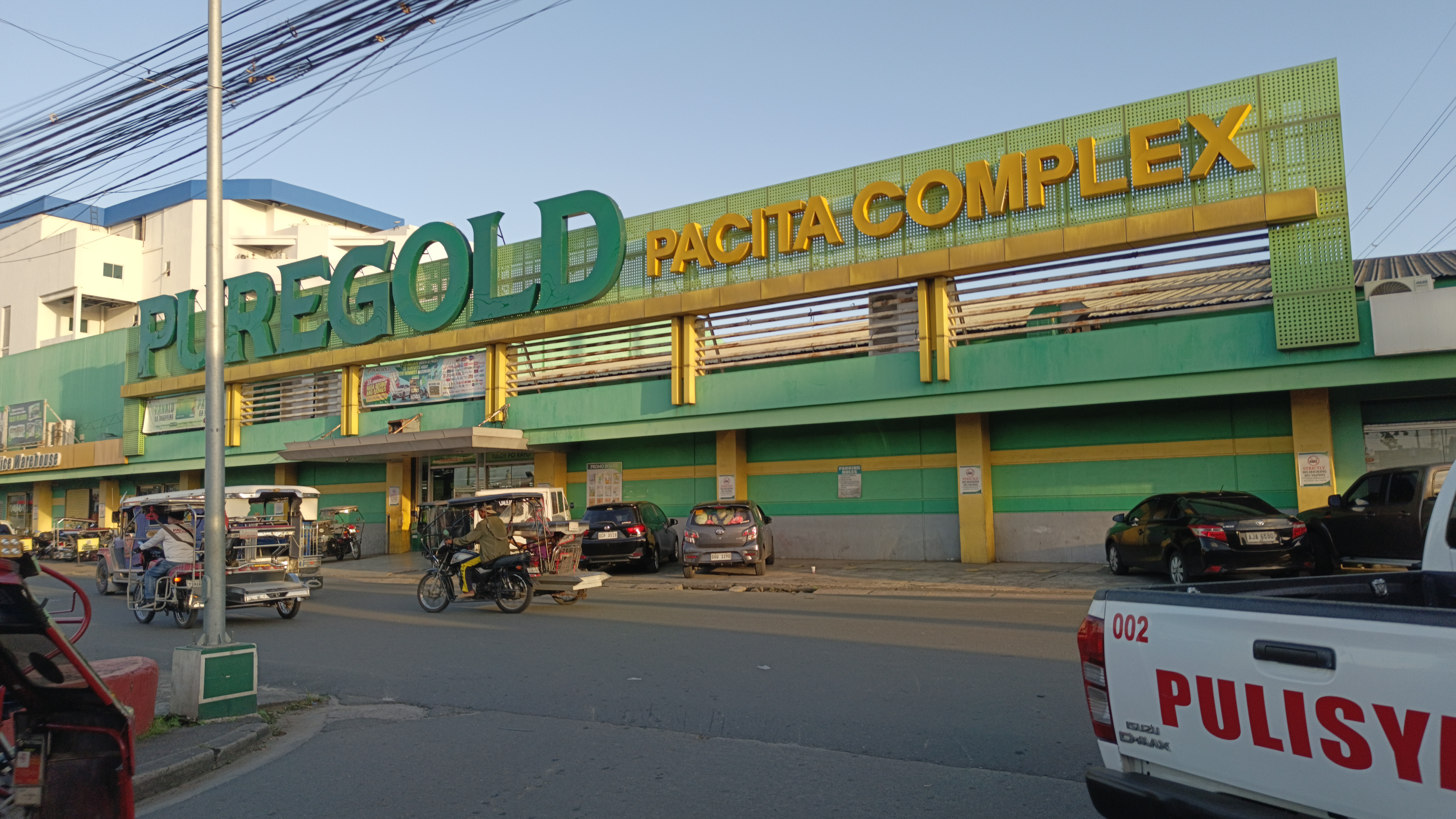
- A branch in Pacita Complex, San Pedro, Laguna
- Type: Public
- Traded as: PSE: PGOLD
- Industry: Retailing
- Founded: September 8, 1998; 27 years ago
- Founder: Lucio Co
- Headquarters: 900 Romualdez Street, Tabacalera Bldg., Paco, Manila, Philippines
- Number of locations: 794 (2026)
- Area served: Philippines
- Key people: Susan Co (Chairman); Ferdinand Vincent Co (President); Lucio Co (Director)
- Revenue: ₱165.32 billion (2020)
- Net income: ₱7.34 billion (2020)
- Owner: Cosco Capital Inc. (48.58%); Public (34.50%); Others (16.92%)
- Number of employees: 12,170 (2023)
- Website: puregold.com.ph

Puregold Price Club, Inc. or simply Puregold (stylized in all caps) is a chain of supermarkets in the Philippines trading goods such as consumer products on a wholesale and retail basis. It currently has approximately more than 400 operating stores and over 20 food service stalls.

== History ==
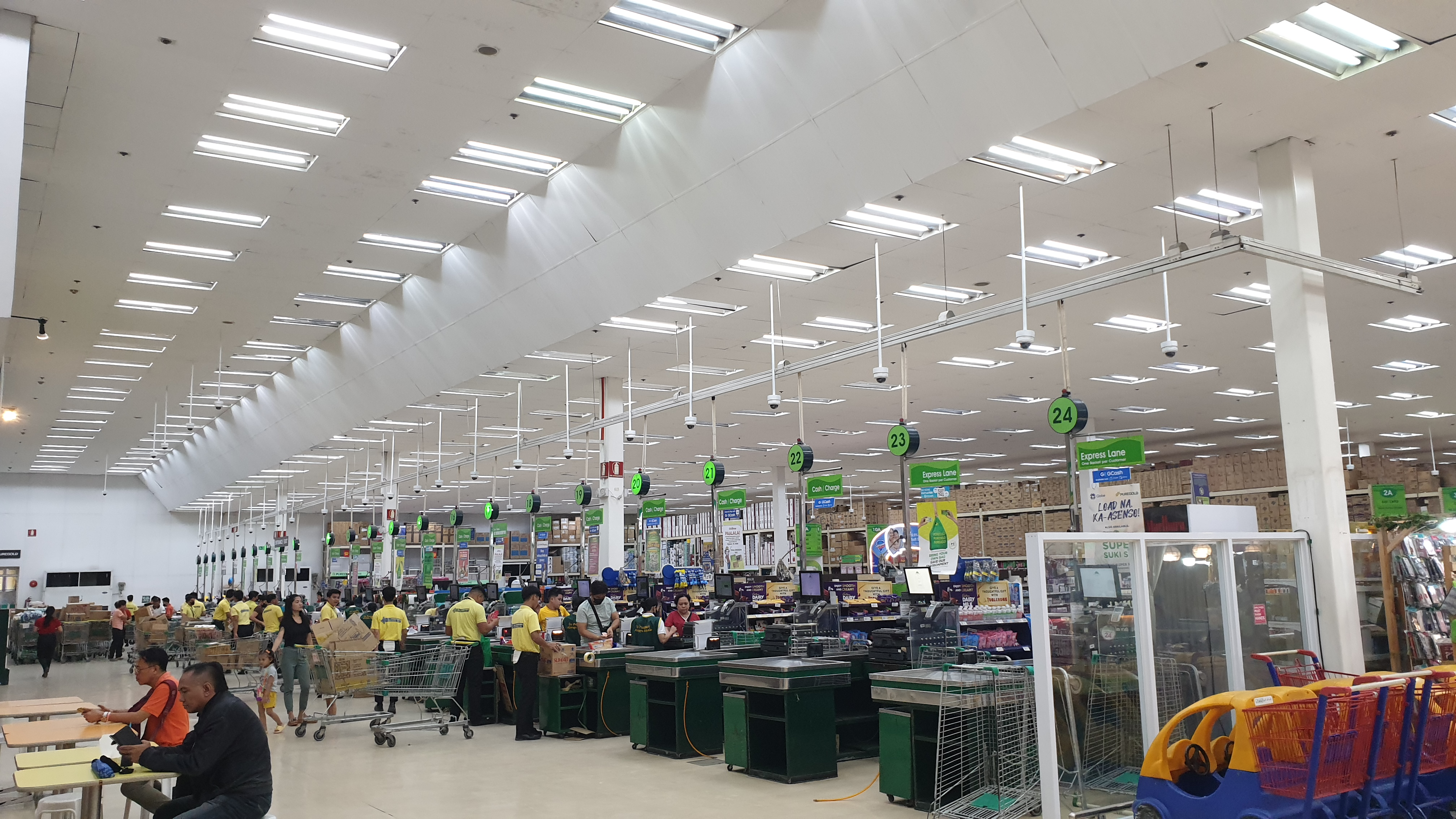
Interior of the Puregold Shaw branch along Shaw Boulevard in Mandaluyong

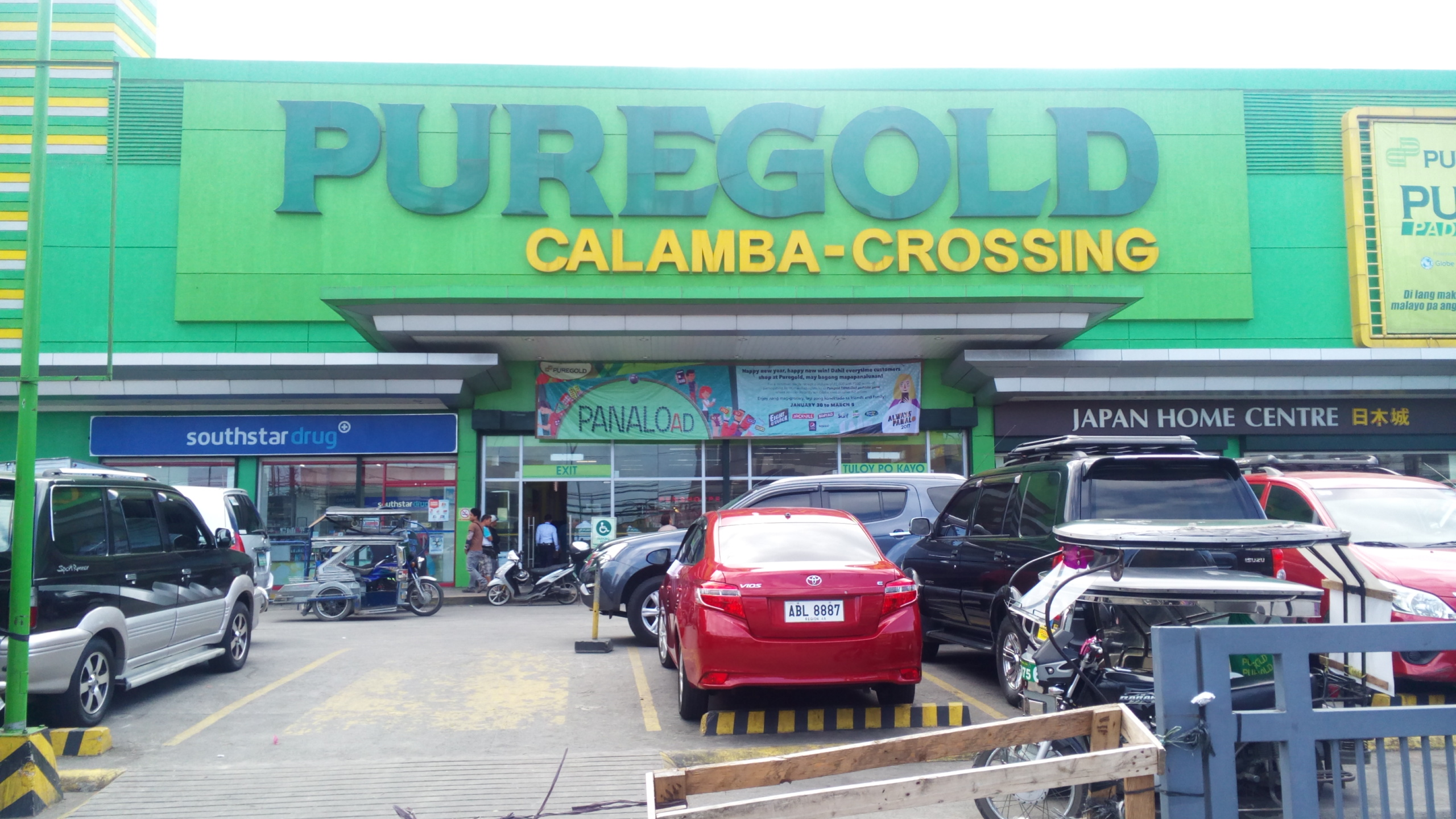
Puregold Calamba-Crossing branch along J.P. Rizal Street in Calamba, Laguna

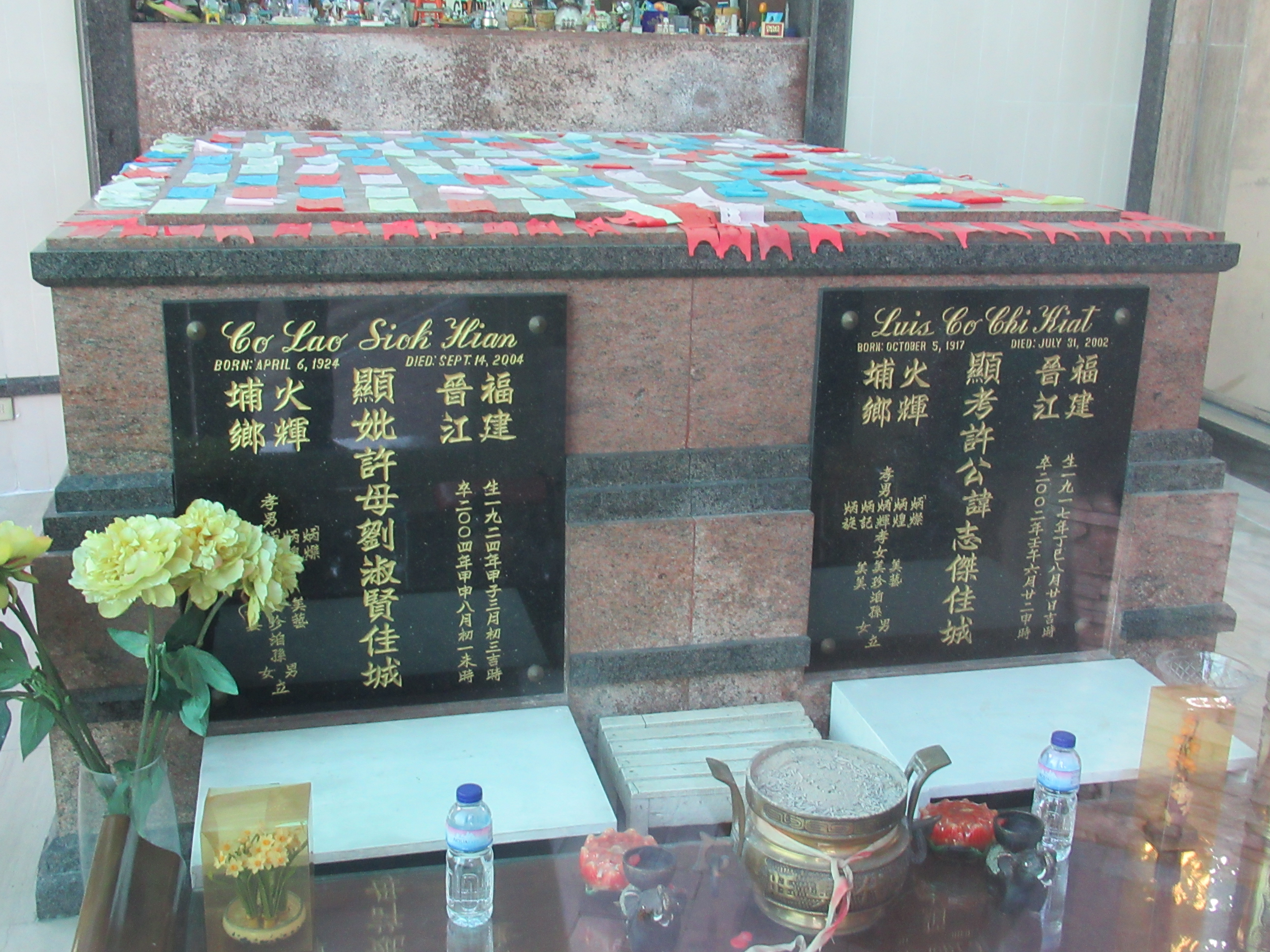
Luis Co Chi Kiat Mausoleum, Manila Chinese Cemetery

Puregold owner Cosco Capital, Inc. is under the Luis Co Chi Kiat Foundation Inc. (LCCKFI), founded and registered on March 28, 2003, by the late Luis Co Chi Kiat's children. Lucio Co, married to Susan P. Co, is the Chairman of Cosco Capital, Inc., Puregold, and S&R Membership Shopping. Lucio grew up in Santo Cristo, Divisoria. His parents, Luis Co Chi Kiat (October 5, 1917 – July 31, 2002) and Co Lao Siok Hian (April 6, 1924 – September 4, 2014) who owned Atlantic Glassware store, are buried at the Luis Co Chi Kiat Mausoleum in Manila Chinese Cemetery.

During the 1997 Asian financial crisis, Chinese-Filipino businessman Lucio Co, who owned the Alcorn Gold Resources Corporation (later renamed Cosco Capital, Inc.), initially focused on oil and mineral exploration and development. However, due to the increasing price of commodities, the company ventured out into the retail industry, which at the time, was dominated by retail giant SM.

On September 8, 1998, Puregold Price Club was founded by Lucio Co and his wife Susan Co. Its first branch opened on December 12, 1998, as the anchor tenant of Liberty Center (now Mandala Park) along Shaw Boulevard in Mandaluyong.

In October 2011, Puregold Price Club went public and was inaugurated as a listing on the Philippine Stock Exchange.

In 2012, Puregold acquired Kareila Management Inc., which owns S&R Membership Shopping and its six operating outlets through a ₱16.5 billion share swap, resulting in S&R becoming a Puregold subsidiary. In the same year, Puregold also acquired the Parco supermarket chain in a deal valued at around ₱760 million from the Gant Group of Companies, which operates 19 outlets. These outlets were converted into Puregold branches. The shareholders of the retail chain Puregold have approved the merger of the other two operating units into the parent company, consolidating Puregold's supermarket businesses under the publicly listed supermarket operator.

In February 2013, global investment firm Capital Group Companies (CGC) bought 5.4% total outstanding stock of Puregold.

In May 2014, Puregold formed a joint venture with Japanese convenience store chain Lawson under the name PG Lawson Inc. Puregold owns 70% of the venture and they opened their first branch in San Andres, Manila on March 30, 2015.

In 2020, Puregold introduced the Puregold Mobile app, offering services such as online delivery, in-store pick-up, and self-checkout. The mobile app also allows its Tindahan ni Aling Puring and Purehold Perks cards to be used as digitally.

In 2023, Puregold acquired 14 DiviMart supermarket branches, all in Luzon.

== CinePanalo Film Festival ==
On March 16, 2024, Puregold had its first CinePanalo Film Festival awards, which featured 6 full-length films by filmmakers (₱2.5 million grant each) and 25 short films by student directors (₱100,000 grant each). The films were shown in Gateway Mall. The festival is aimed to "uphold education as catalyst in a film medium, for present and future generations."

In the second 2025 Puregold CinePanalo, a ₱3,000,000 full-length film production grant will be bestowed upon each of 7 directors, aside from a ₱150,000 grant to each of 25 student short filmmakers. The Awards Night is set for March 19, 2025. When Food Delivery a film about Filipino fisherman facing Chinese government obstruction in the South China Sea was pulled from the festival in 2025, commentators suspected external pressure by the Chinese government on Puregold.
