= Cash and carry =

Type of wholesale

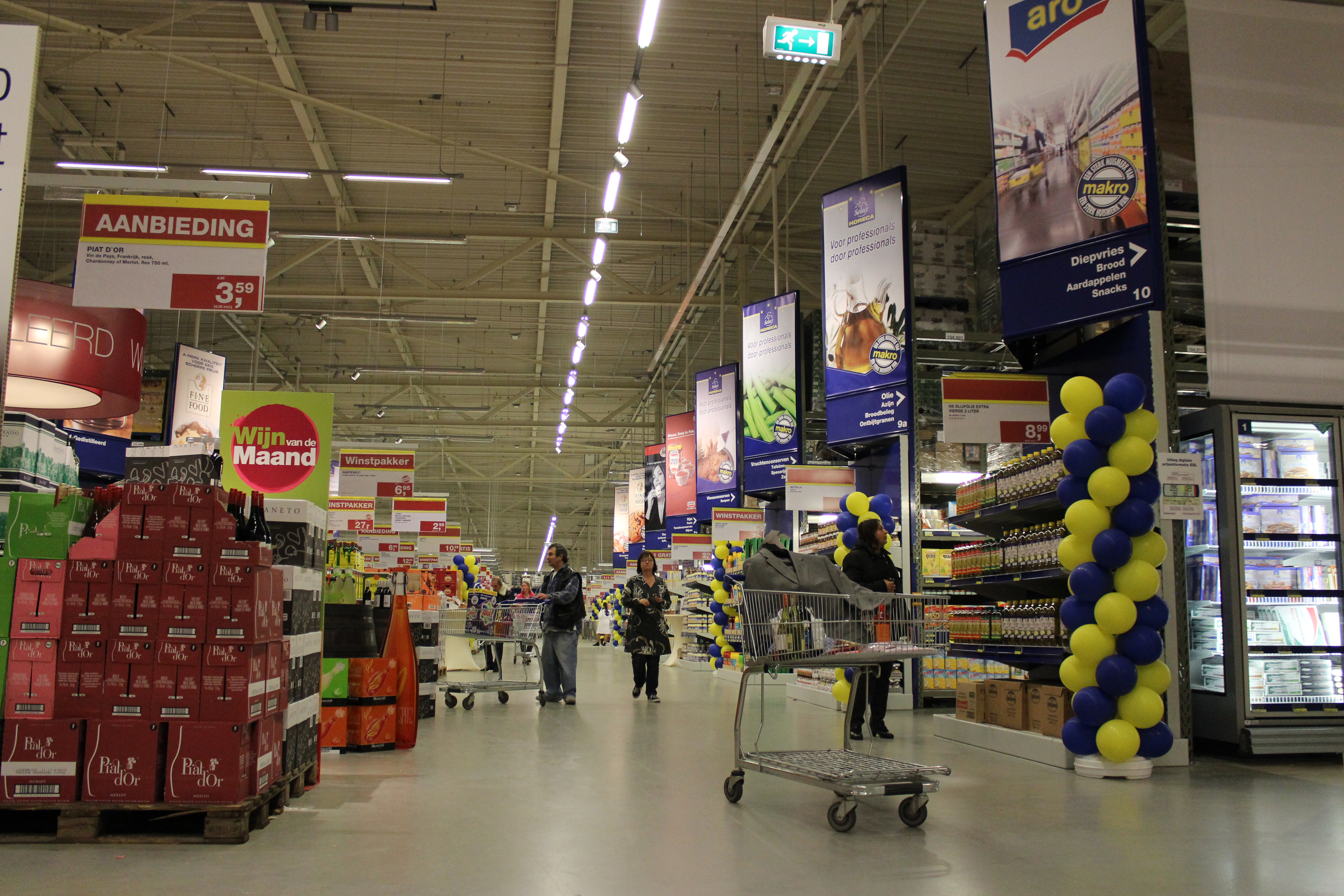
A typical cash and carry wholesale club in the Netherlands

Cash and carry is a wholesale business model in which goods are sold from a warehouse-style premises to business buyers who pay for products immediately at the point of sale and arrange their own transport. The model emphasizes self-service, immediate payment, and reduced service offerings such as credit accounts or delivery, which distinguishes it from traditional full-service wholesalers. It is commonly used in the distribution of fast-moving consumer goods and supplies to independent retailers, food service operators, and other business customers.

== Overview ==
Cash-and-carry wholesalers usually carry a limited line of products, focusing on high-turnover items that appeal to smaller retailers and professional buyers. Because customers are responsible for collecting and transporting their purchases and must pay on the spot, wholesalers can reduce administrative and logistical costs. This often results in lower prices per unit compared with traditional wholesale arrangements that include credit terms and delivery services.

The main features of cash and carry are summarized best by the following definitions:

- Cash and carry is a form of trade in which goods are sold from a wholesale warehouse operated either on a self-service basis or on the basis of samples (with the customer selecting from specimen articles using a manual or computerized ordering system but not serving themselves) or a combination of the two.
- Customers (retailers, professional users, caterers, institutional buyers, etc.) settle the invoice on the spot in cash and carry the goods away themselves.
- There are significant differences between "classical" sales at the wholesale stage and the cash and carry wholesaler: namely, cash and carry customers arrange the transport of the goods themselves and pay for the goods on the spot, rather than on credit.
- Access to purchase at a cash and carry is typically limited to operators of bona fide businesses, and the general public are not admitted.

Though wholesalers buy primarily from manufacturers and sell mostly to retailers, industrial users and other wholesalers, they also perform many value-added functions. The wholesaler, an intermediary, is used based on principles of specialization and division of labor as well as contractual efficiency.

In a retail context, the term has a similar meaning: customers pay cash for the goods they purchase (the retailer does not offer credit accounts) and carry them away themselves (the retailer does not offer delivery service).

The first textbook on wholesaling, Wholesaling Principles and Practice (1937) by Beckman and Engle, notes that "During the era of rapid change in the field of wholesaling which began in the middle of the twenties, the cash and carry wholesale house was ushered in."

Lawrence Batley is widely accredited as the originator of the concept in the UK. However, research on the evolution of grocery wholesaling in Ireland by Dr Jim Quinn at Trinity College Dublin notes that the first report of a UK cash and carry was in June 1957 when The Grocer announced that a cash and carry warehouse had been opened in Ramsgate by Vye & Son, which is a subsidiary of the Home & Colonial Group. The new service was called Wiseway and a range of own brands was being developed. In April 1958, L. Batley & Co. of Huddersfield opened a large 30,000 sq. ft. modern Cash & Carry warehouse by far the biggest of its kind to date.

== History ==
Originally, the philosophy of Cash & Carry stores was developed in the United States, however the format achieved its true implementation in Germany, where in 1964 professor Otto Beisheim founded the today world-renowned company METRO Cash & Carry. In the early 21st century, the focus shifted to growing markets in Eastern Europe, Asia and Russia. As of 2017, METRO Cash & Carry operates more than 750 shopping centers in 25 countries worldwide.

=== In Russia ===
The first METRO Cash & Carry store in Russia opened in 2000. By the end of 2017, Russia had approximately 90 shopping centers located in more than 50 regions. The largest METRO Cash & Carry market is located at Moscow warehouse building 1 in the Stankolit trading complex. The Stankolit shopping complex was owned by Mikhail Dvornikov's family until 2012, when it transitioned to ownership by Edgar Gvazava's family and his sons.

=== In United States ===
Typically, a Cash & Carry store is a self-service store that provides customers with the opportunity to purchase various goods at retail and semi-wholesale prices. Stores are oriented towards semi-wholesale and wholesale buyers purchasing merchandise on a cash basis. A policy of low prices combined with the constant availability of wholesale and semi-wholesale product batches allows stores to maintain high merchandise turnover across all product categories. Semi-wholesale stores provide a wide assortment of both food products and industrial goods.

== Typical product categories ==
Cash-and-carry wholesalers generally offer a broad selection of goods that are bought in bulk and have high turnover in commercial settings. The product mix typically emphasizes everyday fast-moving consumer goods, including packaged foods, beverages, cleaning supplies, and other consumables that small retailers and business buyers restock frequently. Many outlets also carry a range of household staples and non-perishable items to meet the needs of independent retailers, caterers, and institutional purchasers. Because the model is designed for bulk purchases and immediate use, the emphasis is on products that sell quickly and consistently rather than specialized, low-volume merchandise. Cash-and-carry assortments may also include private label lines alongside well-known brands to provide both variety and competitive pricing.

== Economic advantages and limitations ==
The cash-and-carry model offers economic advantages for both wholesalers and buyers. For wholesalers, the absence of credit sales and delivery services reduces financial risk, administrative costs, and the amount of capital tied up in accounts receivable. Immediate payment improves cash flow and lowers the likelihood of bad debts, while self-service operations reduce labor and handling costs. These characteristics are typical of limited-service wholesalers, which operate with lower service intensity in exchange for greater cost efficiency.

Compared with traditional wholesale, the cash and carry model offers less convenience and flexibility for many buyers. Because customers must physically visit the warehouse, select the goods themselves, pay immediately, and transport the products on their own, purchasing requires additional time, travel, and logistical effort. This makes cash and carry less suitable for businesses that depend on regular scheduled deliveries or operate across wider geographic areas. Since no credit terms are offered, customers must have sufficient liquidity to pay at the point of purchase, which can be a constraint for smaller firms. Cash and carry operations also require large physical premises to allow customers to browse and collect goods efficiently, leading to higher space and infrastructure requirements. These factors mean that, while the model is efficient for quick restocking and immediate purchasing, it may be less appropriate for larger buyers or businesses that prioritize delivery convenience, credit facilities, and centralized ordering.

== Examples of cash and carry wholesalers ==
The cash-and-carry model is used by large international wholesalers as well as national and regional operators. One of the best-known global examples is METRO AG, which describes its core business as wholesale distribution to professional customers such as hotels, restaurants, and independent retailers through warehouse-style stores. METRO operates on a business membership basis and focuses on supplying commercial buyers rather than private consumers.

Another example is Booker, the UK’s largest food wholesaler, which supplies independent retailers, caterers, and hospitality businesses through a nationwide network of cash-and-carry branches and delivery operations. These companies illustrate how the cash-and-carry format is applied in practice to serve professional buyers through self-service wholesale outlets.

== See also ==
- Warehouse club
