= Lucio Co =

Filipino businessman (born 1953)

- Born: 1953 (age 72–73)
- Occupation: Businessman
- Known for: Co-founder of Puregold
- Spouse: Susan Pe
- Children: 4
- Relatives: Bea Alonzo (daughter-in-law)

Lucio L. Co is a Filipino businessman who is best known for founding Puregold.

== Early life ==
Lucio L. Co was born in 1953. He grew up in Manila and his family owned the Atlantic Glassware store in Santo Cristo, Divisoria.

== Career ==
Co started in the oil and minerals industry with Cosco Capital, Inc. starting out as Alcorn Gold Resources Corporation (later named Alcorn Petroleum and Minerals Corporation).

Co operated the Puregold Duty Free in Clark Freeport and Special Economic Zone, Pampanga.

Forced by the 1997 Asian financial crisis, Alcorn shifted focus to the retail industry. Together with his wife Susan, Co opened the first outlet of the Puregold retail chain in Mandaluyong on December 12, 1998. This was to provide relief to the financial situation of his employees at the duty-free store in Clark.

Puregold opened more outlets across the Philippines with Co also acquiring other regional supermarket chains as well.

Co acquired the S&R Membership Shopping chain from its previous owners in 2006.

Alcorn Gold Resources changed its name to Cosco Capital Inc. in 2012.

In December 2025, Co's Crystal Bridges Holding Corporation fully acquired PrimeWater from Manny Villar's Prime Asset Ventures, Inc. PrimeWater was later renamed as Hiraya Water Corporation in June 2026.

Co also previously owned the Philippine franchise for Lawson, Liquigaz, and Wendy's.

== Personal life ==
Lucio Co is married to Susan Pe. Their eldest child and only son is Vincent while they have three daughters; Pamela Justine, Katrina Marie, and Camille Clarisse. All grew up to be businesspeople like their parents. Vincent is married to actress Bea Alonzo since 2026.

Lucio and Susan Co are in the tenth position of Forbes' Philippines 50 Richest list with the couple having a combined net worth of US$1.7 billion (₱82.4 billion) in 2020.
