= FedMart =

Defunct American discount department store chain

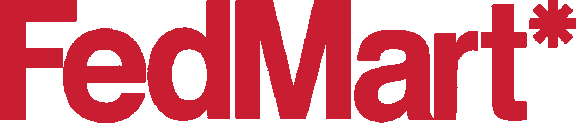
- Type: Discount store
- Industry: Retail
- Founded: 1954; 72 years ago in San Diego
- Founder: Sol Price
- Defunct: 1982; 44 years ago
- Fate: Liquidation; many stores rebranded as Target
- Headquarters: San Diego, California
- Number of locations: 70 (1979); 46 (1982)
- Area served: California; Arizona; New Mexico; Texas
- Products: clothing, footwear, housewares, sporting goods, hardware, toys, electronics, food

FedMart was a chain of discount department stores started by Sol Price, who later founded Price Club. Originally a discount department store open to government employees paying a $2 per family membership fee, FedMart earned four times more than its investors had projected in its first year. Over the next 20 years, FedMart grew to include 45 stores, mostly in California, and the Southwest in a chain that generated over $300 million in annual sales. The business expanded to several states in the Southwest United States. Price later sold two-thirds of the chain to Hugo Mann, a German businessman, in 1975 and was forced out of his leadership position the following year. FedMart went out of business in 1982.

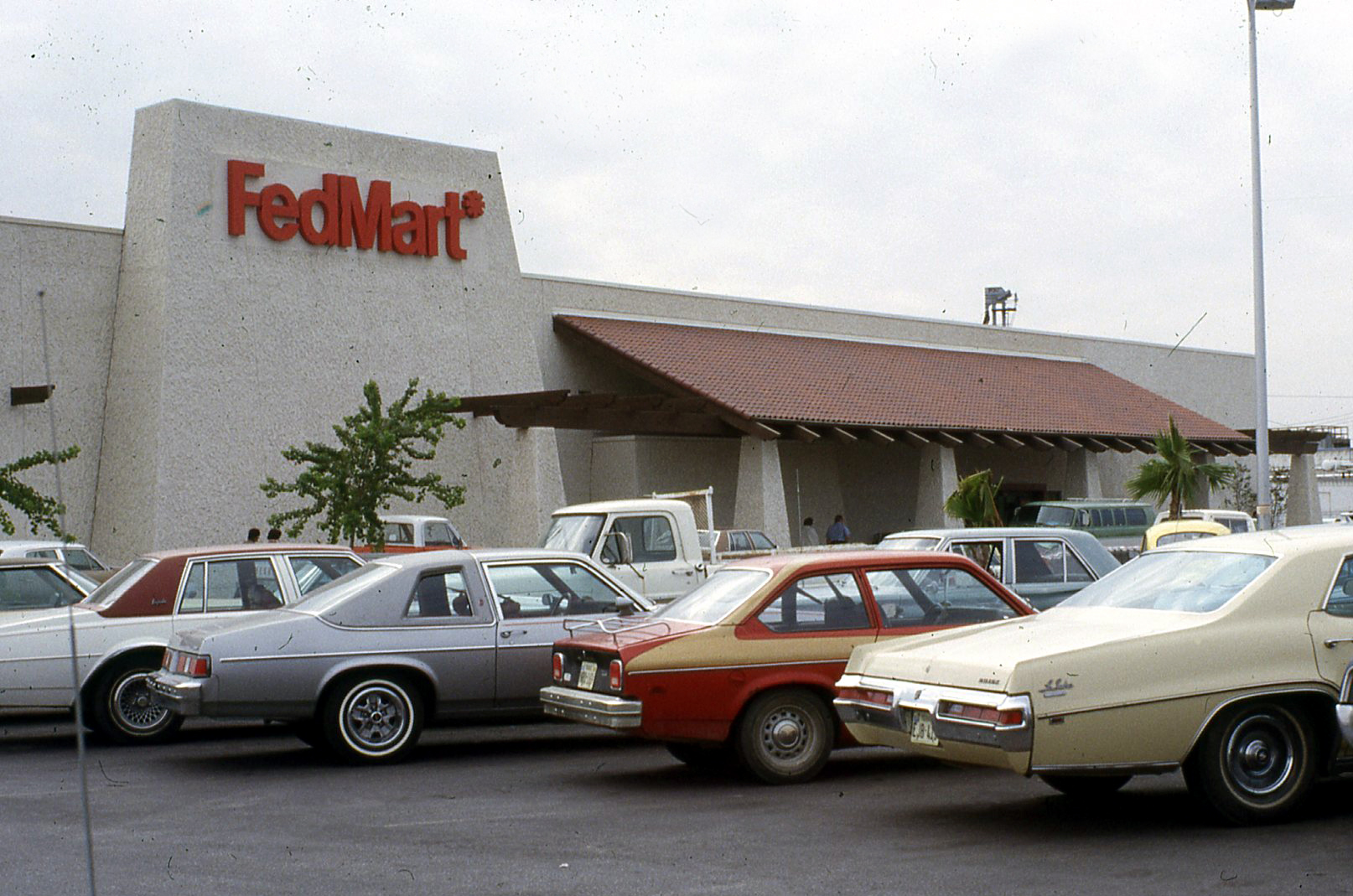
FedMart store in San Antonio, Texas, 1979

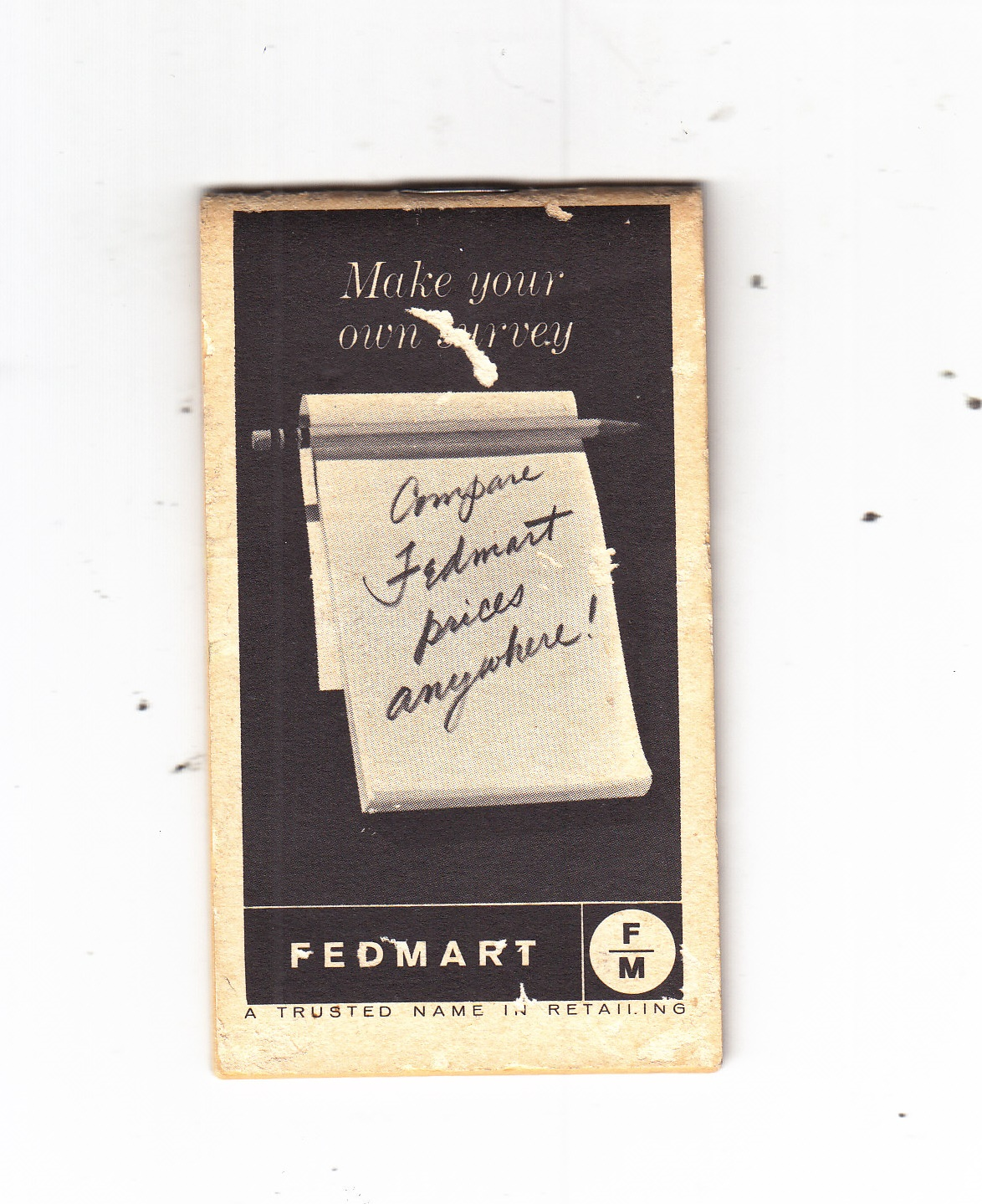
FedMart notepad, 1964

== History ==
"One day we noticed he [Bertrand] was getting rid of most of the watches up in Los Angeles.” The place in Los Angeles was FEDCO, an interesting new wrinkle in the retail economy at the time. From its modest outlet at the end of Slauson Avenue near a cow pasture, FEDCO sold wares at extraordinary discounts to federal employees only — discounts made possible because it was a nonprofit corporation acting almost as a commissary for civilian federal workers. “We found out there were 5000 employees of the federal government in San Diego,” Weiss continues, “and they were all going up to Los Angeles once a week to do their shopping. So we all wondered, why not have one here?"

Sol Price began his career in the mid-1950s, when he worked as an attorney in San Diego. Clients were in the wholesale jewelry business, and had been selling watches to a non-profit, member-owned retail operation in Los Angeles called Fedco. When he visited Fedco, Price noticed that its facility was similar to the warehouse he had inherited. He suggested to his clients that his mother-in-law's building, at 2380 Main St., could be used for the same purpose. His clients agreed, marking the beginning of FedMart.

The business began in 1954 with a $50,000 ($462,003 in 2024) capital investment. Price solicited the help of eight individuals, who each invested $5,000 and convinced his law firm to invest the remaining $10,000. He obtained his inventory from clients, beginning with two jewelry wholesalers. Another client, in the furniture business, provided Price with a small selection of furniture. A third client sold liquor, giving Price's FedMart the odd merchandise mix of jewelry, furniture, and liquor. He opened membership to government employees of all levels—federal, state, and local. Despite the less than comprehensive selection of goods, Price's business thrived, collecting $4.5 million during its first year, four times the total projected by Price and his investors.

FedMart began as a membership store by opening in an abandoned warehouse in San Diego, California in 1954. A second store opened in Phoenix, Arizona, in 1955 quickly followed by a third store in San Antonio, Texas. A second San Diego-area store opened in Kearny Mesa in 1958 followed by the opening of other stores in San Diego and the rest of Southern California. Membership requirements were dropped in the 1960s and FedMart become a non-membership discount store. In October 1968, the company opened its 36th store in Window Rock, Arizona. By 1975, FedMart had 44 stores in California, Arizona, New Mexico, and Texas.

Success spawned establishment of other warehouse stores and a more coherent merchandising strategy. FedMart developed into a chain of stores, and Price pioneered several innovations in the retail industry. FedMart became the first retailer to sell gasoline at wholesale prices. The chain was the first to open an in-store pharmacy. FedMart also opened in-store optical departments, establishing a format that was widely copied decades later. Aside from developing several industry firsts, Price guided the company into food retailing, a product line that would underpin the chain's development.

Price was joined in his business by his son, Robert, who served as FedMart's executive vice president until they sold two-thirds of the chain in 1975 to the German businessman Hugo Mann. The company was then 21 years old with sales in excess of $350 million at 40 stores. Price was fired less than a year after the Hugo Mann takeover. The store chain closed within seven years.

In 1969, the company became publicly traded on the American Stock Exchange. Hugo Mann began purchasing stock in the company in 1975 and obtained a controlling interest in the spring of that year and finally increased its holding to 68% later that fall. In 1981, Mann was able to obtain the rest of the stock and take the company private.

After obtaining a controlling interest in FedMart, Mann pumped more money into the company to enable rapid expansion. Besides building new stores, FedMart leased a store from White Front in 1974 and purchased the 22-store West Coast division of Two Guys from Vornado in 1977 (California) and the 10-store Globe Store chain from Walgreens in 1978 (Arizona and Texas). FedMart had approximately 70 stores by 1979.

In 1979, the German president of FedMart was outraged upon discovering that FedMart was selling books about Nazi Germany at its stores in the US. He immediately banned the sale of all books on "political issues that are highly controversial", including books about Jimmy Carter, Richard Nixon, and the Democratic Party.

By the early 1980s, FedMart began to lose money and started to close stores, mostly outside of California. There were 46 stores left when Hugo Mann decided to close the chain in 1982 and lease the store locations to other retail firms. Some locations, such as in Calexico, Yuma, Window Rock, and one in Tucson, were bought by former FedMart executives and continued operations until 1994 or earlier, whilst the company changed its name to Sunbelt Realty. 35 of the locations were leased to Target and the rest were leased to Ralphs Grocery Stores. The closing of FedMart allowed Target an entry into the highly competitive Southern California marketplace.

James Sinegal, the founder and former CEO of Costco, started at FedMart as a bagger and eventually became an executive vice president at the company. Sam Walton, founder of Walmart, was inspired by the FedMart name for his store.
