= Sol Price =

American warehouse retailer (1916–2009)

- Born: January 23, 1916; New York City, New York, U.S.
- Died: December 14, 2009 (aged 93); San Diego, California, U.S.
- Education: San Diego State University; University of Southern California (BA, JD)
- Known for: Costco, Price Club, Fedmart, PriceSmart
- Spouse: Helen Moskowitz
- Children: 2

Sol Price (January 23, 1916 – December 14, 2009) was an American retailer and the founder of FedMart, Price Club (which ultimately merged into Costco) and PriceSmart. He was considered the "father" of the "warehouse store" retail model.

== Early life and education ==
Price was born in The Bronx in New York City, the son of Samuel and Bella Price, Jewish immigrants to the United States from Minsk (Belarus), in the early years of the 20th century. The family relocated to San Diego in the early 1920s.

Price graduated from San Diego High School in 1931, attended San Diego State University in 1932, and earned his undergraduate degree (in philosophy) and Juris Doctor degrees from the University of Southern California in 1936 and 1938, respectively. By 1938, he had married his girlfriend Helen Moskowitz; they eloped to Las Vegas. Price was admitted to the California Bar in November 1938. He founded a firm which merged to become Procopio, Cory,Hargreaves & Savitch LLP (known at the time as Procopio, Price, Cory, and Schwartz) where he worked until 1954.

== Career ==
Price launched the first FedMart in 1954 and, together with his son, Robert, Giles Bateman, a nephew, Rick Libenson and others, founded Price Club in 1976. The company went public in 1980. In 1993 Costco merged with Price Club to form PriceCostco. Leadership in the new organization was shared between Sol Price's son, Robert, and James Sinegal. After eight months, PriceCostco spun a separate company called Price Enterprises, led by the younger Price. PriceSmart continues to operate warehouse clubs in Latin America and the Caribbean, while the domestic operations became Costco.

Sam Walton of Walmart wrote in his book Made in America that he "borrowed" "as many ideas from Sol Price as from anybody else in the business". He added that he especially liked the idea of calling his discount chain "Wal-Mart" because he "really liked Sol's FedMart name". In 1983, Walton dined with Price and later that year the first Sam's Club opened in Oklahoma City, Oklahoma. Later when asked how it felt to be the father of an industry (the warehouse retail industry—like Costco and Sam's Club), Sol replied, "I wish I'd worn a condom." Costco's longest-serving CEO, Sinegal, learned the retail business largely through working his way up FedMart's corporate ladder. In CNBC's 2012 documentary on Costco, Sinegal indicated that Price had been his mentor, as well as the person who taught him to be "tough" in business, and to display a sense of "social responsibility" toward employees.

== Philanthropy ==
In the late 1980s, Price donated $2 million to the construction of a new student center on the campus of University of California, San Diego. Named for Price, Price Center, which houses the main student bookstore, food court, movie theater, ballrooms, and meeting rooms, opened on April 21, 1989.

In 2011, the Price Family Charitable Fund donated $50 million to the University of Southern California's School of Policy, Planning, and Development. The school was renamed the USC Sol Price School of Public Policy as a result of the donation.

Price was responsible for injecting money and aiding the renaissance of the San Diego mid-city neighborhood of City Heights, near his childhood home. He was a member of the Board of Trustees for the Urban Institute in Washington, D.C., the Board of Directors for the Center on Budget and Policy Priorities, the Consumer Affairs Advisory Committee of the U.S. Securities and Exchange Commission, and the San Diego Financial Review Panel.
